= List of sarcopterygian genera =

This list of lobe-finned fish is a comprehensive listing of all genera that have ever been included in the class Sarcopterygii, excluding purely vernacular terms and tetrapods. The list includes all commonly accepted genera, but also genera that are now considered invalid, doubtful (nomen dubium), or were not formally published (nomen nudum), as well as junior synonyms.

Extant genera are bolded. All non-bolded genera are extinct.

== Scope and terminology ==
There is no official, canonical list of lobe-finned fish genera.

=== Authors and Year ===
The authors column lists the authors of the formal description responsible for the erection of the genus listed. They are not necessarily the same as the authors of the type species as sometimes a species from one genus is determined sufficiently distinct to warrant the erection of a new genus to house it. If this is the case, only the latter authors will be listed. The year column notes the year the description was published.

=== Status ===
Naming conventions and terminology follow the International Code of Zoological Nomenclature. Technical terms used include:

- Junior synonym: A name which describes the same taxon as a previously published name. If two or more genera are formally designated and the type specimens are later assigned to the same genus, the first to be published (in chronological order) is the senior synonym, and all other instances are junior synonyms. Senior synonyms are generally used, except by special decision of the ICZN, but junior synonyms cannot be used again, even if deprecated. Junior synonymy is often subjective, unless the genera described were both based on the same type specimen.
- **Nomen nudum** (Latin for "naked name"): A name that has appeared in print but has not yet been formally published by the standards of the ICZN. Nomina nuda (the plural form) are invalid, and are therefore not italicized as a proper generic name would be. If the name is later formally published, that name is no longer a nomen nudum and will be italicized on this list. Often, the formally published name will differ from any nomina nuda that describe the same specimen.
- Preoccupied name: A name that is formally published, but which has already been used for another taxon. This second use is invalid (as are all subsequent uses) and the name must be replaced. As preoccupied names are not valid generic names, they will also go unitalicized on this list.
- **Nomen dubium** (Latin for "dubious name"): A name describing a fossil with no unique diagnostic features.

=== Age ===
The age column denotes the epoch of geologic time to which the fossils date. The abbreviations are as follows.

- uTri is Upper Triassic
- lJur is Lower Jurassic
- mJur is Middle Jurassic
- uJur is Upper Jurassic
- lCret is Lower Cretaceous
- uCret is Upper Cretaceous

Genera that are invalid, misidentified, or otherwise do not represent a valid sarcopterygian are listed as age N/A because there was never a time in which a sarcopterygian by that generic name actually lived.

=== Location and Notes ===
The location column designates the geographic region where remains of the relevant genus have been found. The regions used are continents except in the case of smaller landmasses (e.g. Cuba). Political bodies, being non-existent in the Mesozoic are not used to indicate genera locations. Genera that are invalid, misidentified, or otherwise do not represent a valid sarcopterygian are listed as location N/A because there was never a place in which a sarcopterygian by that generic name actually lived. Extant marine sarcopterygians are listed by ocean. Extant freshwater sarcopterygians are listed by continent. The notes column is a collection of annotations on the scientific significance and taxonomic history of listed genera, as well as elaborations on the information presented in other columns.

== A-L ==
Genus	Authors	Year	Status	Age	Location	Notes
Achoania	Zhu, Yu, Ahlberg	2001	Valid.	Early Devonian	Asia	
Alcoveria	Beltan	1972	Valid.	Middle Triassic		
Allenypterus	Melton	1969	Valid.	Mississippian		
Amadeodipterus	Young, Schultze	2005	Valid.		Australia	
Andreyevichthys	Krupina	1987	Valid.			
Archichthys	Hancock, Atthey	1870	Valid.			
Arganodus	Martin	1979	Valid.	Late Triassic		
Asiatoceratodus	Vorobyeva	1967	Valid.	Middle Triassic-Cretaceous	Kyrgyzstan, Ethiopia, Niger, Morocco	
Axelia	Stensiö	1921	Valid.	Early Triassic		
Axelrodichthys	Maisey	1986	Valid.	Early Cretaceous		
Barameda	Long	1989	Valid.			
Barwickia	Long	1992	Valid.			
Beelarongia	Long	1987	Valid.	Late Devonian		
Beltanodus	Schultze	1981	Valid.			
Bogdanovia	Obruchev	1955	Valid.			
Bukkanodus	Johanson, Long, Talent, Janvier, Warren	2007	Valid.			
Cabonnichthys	Ahlberg, Johanson	1997	Valid.	Famennian to Late Devonian		
Canowindra	Thomson	1973	Valid.	Late Devonian		
Canningius		XXXX	Valid.	Middle Devonian		
Caridosuctor	Lund, Lund	1984	Valid.	Mississippian		
Ceratodus	Agassiz	1837	Valid.			
Chagrinia	Schaeffer	1962	Valid.	Late Devonian		
Changxingia	Wang, Liu	1981	Valid.			
Chinlea	Schaeffer	1967	Valid.	Late Triassic		
Chirodipterus	Jaekel	1933	Valid.			
Chrysolepis	Lebedev	1983	Valid.	Late Devonian		
Cladarosymblema	Fox, Campbell, Barwick, Long	1995	Valid.			
Coccoderma	Zittel	1887	Valid.	Late Jurassic		
Coelacanthopsis	Traquair	1901	Valid.			
Coelacanthus	Agassiz	1844	Valid.	Guadalupian		
Conchodus	M'Coy	1848	Valid.			
Conchopoma	Kner	1868	Valid.			
Cryptolepis	Vorobyeva	1975	Valid.	Late Devonian		
Ctenodus	Agassiz	1838	Valid.			
Devonosteus	Jaekel	1927	Valid.	Middle Devonian to Late Devonian		
Diabolepis	Zhnag, Miman, Yu	1987	Valid.	Early Devonian		
Dictyonosteus	Stromer	1918	Valid.			
Lualabaea		XXXX	Valid.	Late Jurassic		
Diplocercides	Stensiö	1922	Valid.	Late Devonian to Mississippian		
Diplurus	Newberry	1878	Valid.			
Dipnorhynchus	Jaekel	1927	Valid.			
Dipterus	Sedgwick, Murchison	1829	Valid.	Middle Devonian to Late Devonian		
Dipnorhynchus	Jaekel	1927	Valid.			
Duffichthys	Ahlberg	1992	Valid.			
Dumfregia	Lund, Lund	1985	Valid.			
Ectosteorhachis	Cope	1880	Valid.	Early Permian		
Elpistostege	Westoll	1938	Valid.	Late Devonian		
Eoactinistia	Johanson, Long, Talent, Janvier, Warren	2006	Valid.			
Eoctenodus	Hills	1929	Valid.			
Euporosteus	Jaekel	1927	Valid.	Middle Devonian to Late Devonian		
Eusthenodon	Jarvik	1952	Valid.	Late Devonian		
Eusthenopteron	Whiteaves	1881	Valid.	Middle Devonian to Late Devonian		
Ferganoceratodus	Cavin, Suteethorn, Buffetaut, Tong	2007	Valid.			
Fleurantia	Graham-Smith, Westoll	1937	Valid.			
Ganopristodus	Traquair	1881	Valid.			
Ganorhynchus	Traquair	1873	Valid.			
Garnbergia	Martin, Wenz	1984	Valid.	Middle Triassic		
Gavinia	Long	1999	Valid.			
Glyptolepis	Agassiz	1844	Valid.	Middle Devonian to Late Devonian		
Glyptopomus	Agassiz	1844	Valid.			
Gnathorhiza	Cope	1883	Valid.			
Gogodipterus	Long	1992	Valid.			
Gogonasus	Long	1985	Valid.	Late Devonian		
Gooloogongia	Johanson, Ahlberg	1998	Valid.	Late Devonian		
Gosfordia	Woodward	1890	Valid.			
Graphiurichthys	White, Roy-Thomas	1937	Valid.	Late Triassic		
Griphognathus	Gross	1956	Valid.	Late Devonian		
Grossipterus	Obruchev	1964	Valid.			
Grossius	Schultze	1973	Valid.	Middle Devonian		
Guiyu			Valid.	Late Silurian		
Gyroptychius	M'Coy	1848	Valid.	Middle Devonian		
Hadronector	Lund, Lund	1984	Valid.	Mississippian		
Hainbergia	Schweizer	1966	Valid.	Middle Triassic		
Hamodus	Obruchev	1931	Valid.	Middle Devonian		
Heimenia	Orvig	1969	Valid.			
Heptanema	Bellotti	1857	Valid.	Middle Triassic to Late Jurassic		
Holodipterus	White; Moy-Thomas	1940	Valid.			
Holophagus	Egerton	1861	Valid.	Early Jurassic to Early Cretaceous		
Holoptychius	Agassiz	1839	Valid.	Middle Devonian to Late Devonian		
Howidipterus	Lo	1992	Valid.			
Hyneria	Thomson	1968	Valid.	Late Devonian		
Ichnomylax	Long, Campbell, Barwick	1994	Valid.			
Indocoelacanthus	Jain	1974	Valid.			
Iowadipterus	Schultze	1992	Valid.			
Iranorhynchus	Janvier, Martin	1978	Valid.			
Kenichthys	Chang, Zhu	1993	Valid.	Early Devonian to Middle Devonian		
Laccognathus	Gross	1941	Valid.			
Langdenia	Janvier, Phuong	1999	Valid.			
**Latimeria**	Smith	1939	Valid.	Present		
Latvius	Jarvik	1948	Valid.	Late Devonian		
Laugia	Stensio	1932	Valid.	Early Triassic		
**Lepidosiren**	Fitzinger	1837	Valid.	Present		
Letognathus	Brazeau	2005	Valid.			
Libys	Münster	1842	Valid.	Late Jurassic		
Livoniana	Ahlberg, Luksevics, Mark-Kuric	2000	Valid.			
Lochmocercus	Lund, Lund	1984	Valid.	Mississippian		
Lualabaea	Saint-Seine	1955	Valid.			
Luckeus	Young, Schultze	2005	Valid.	Early Devonian to Middle Devonian		

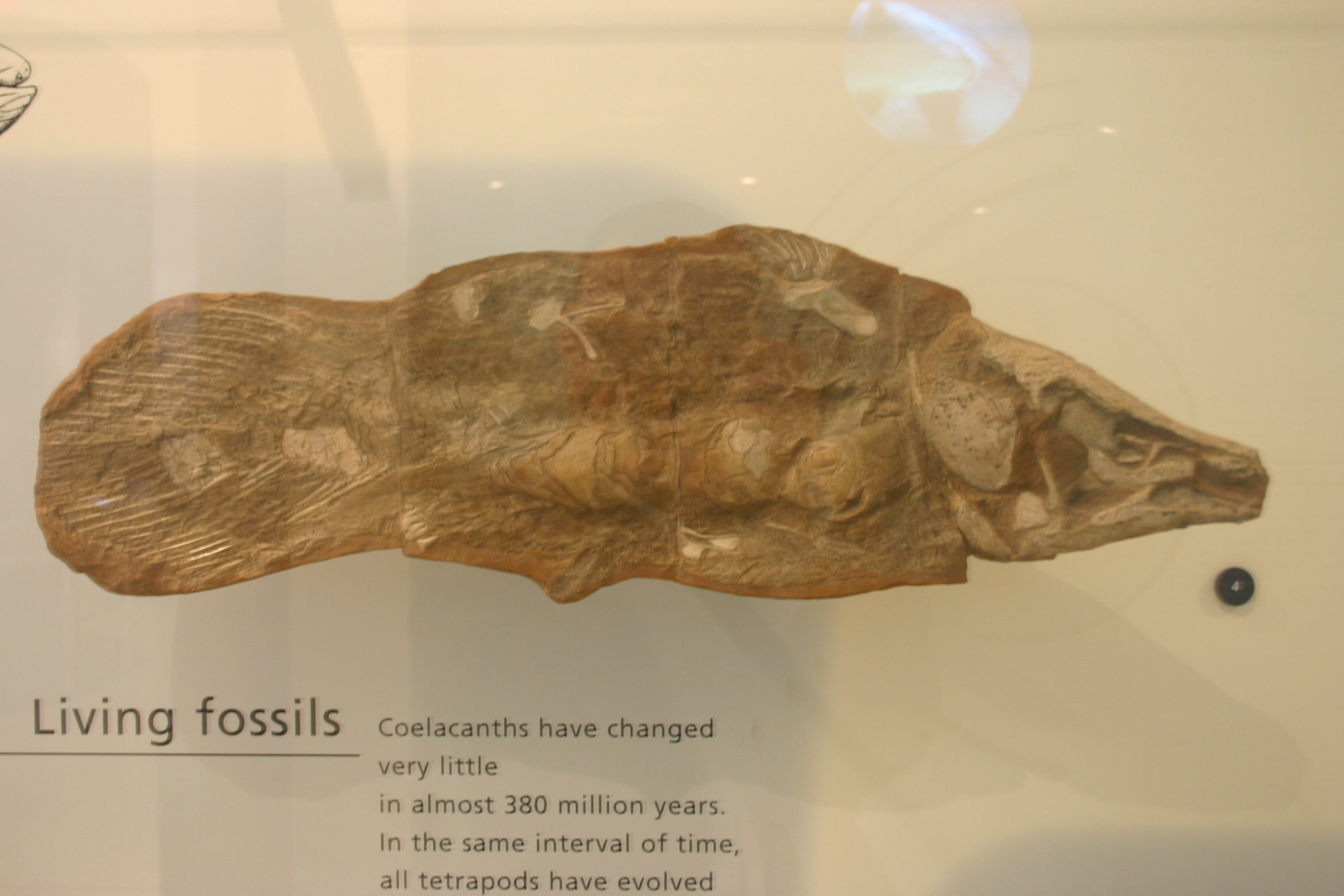
Axelrodichthys.

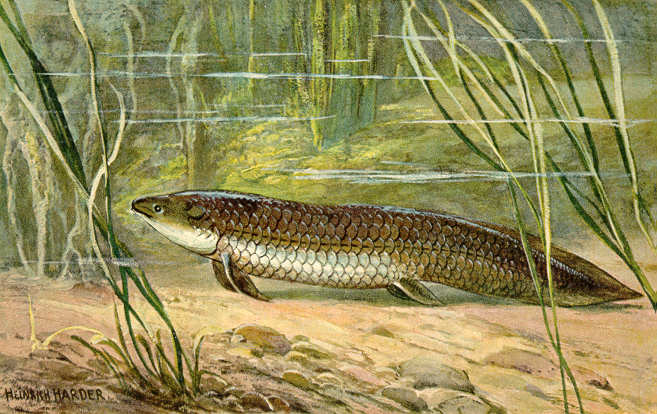
Ceratodus

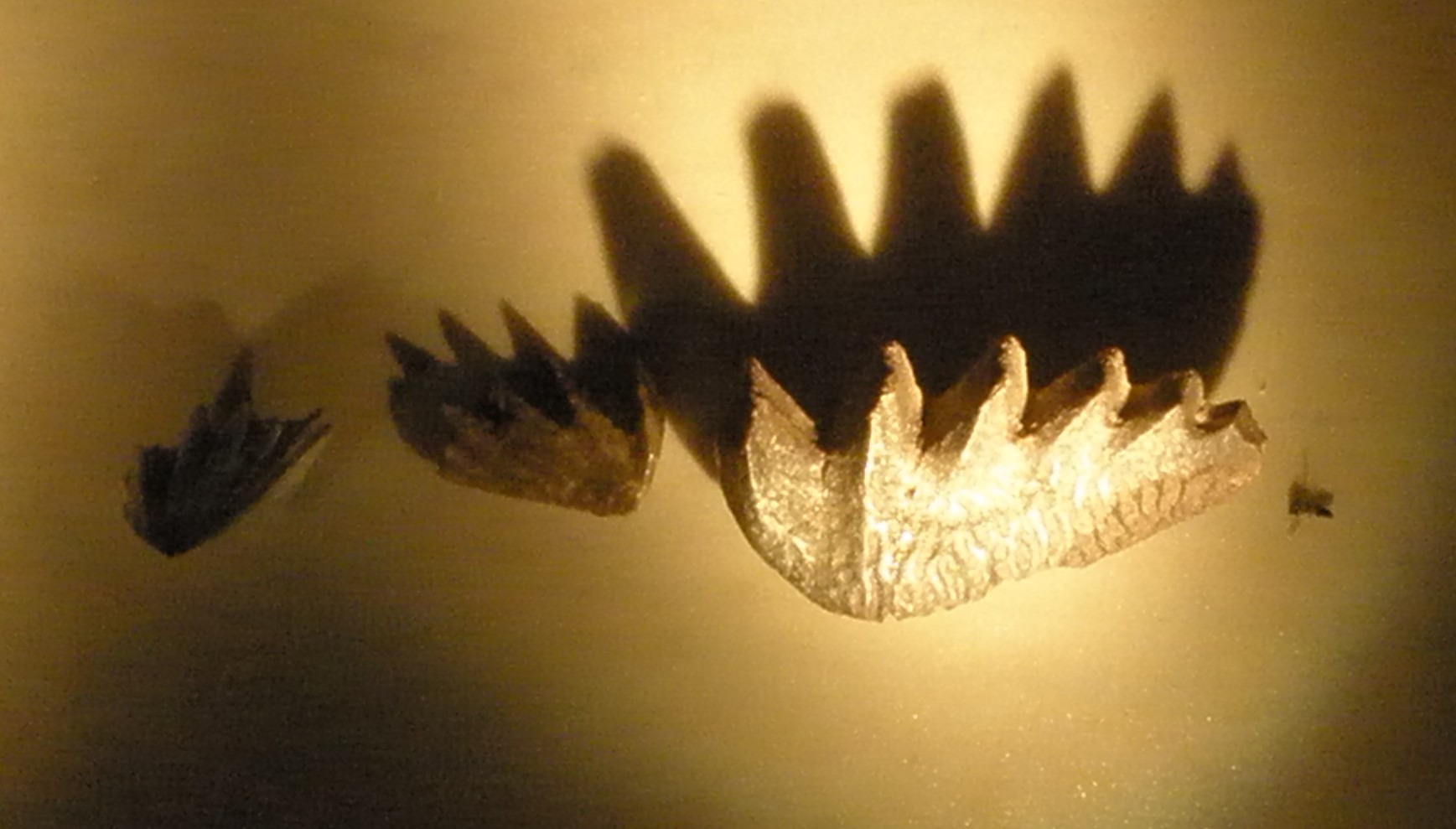
Ceratodus tooth plates.

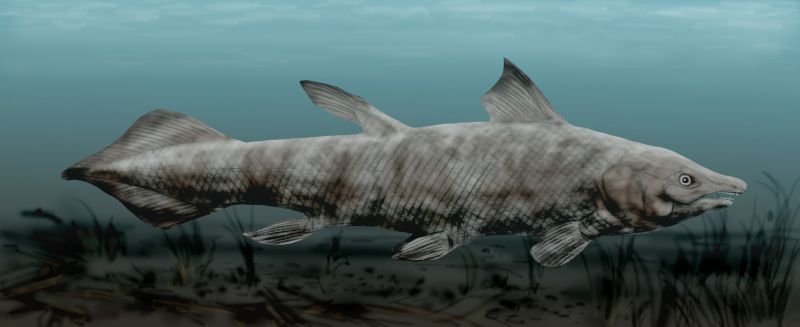
Chinlea

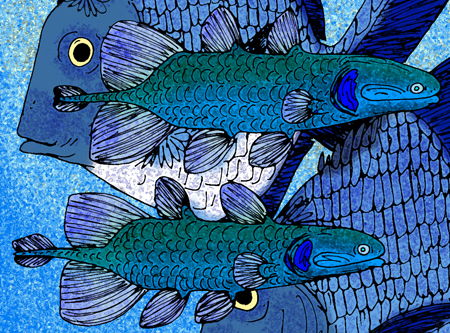
Coelacanthus

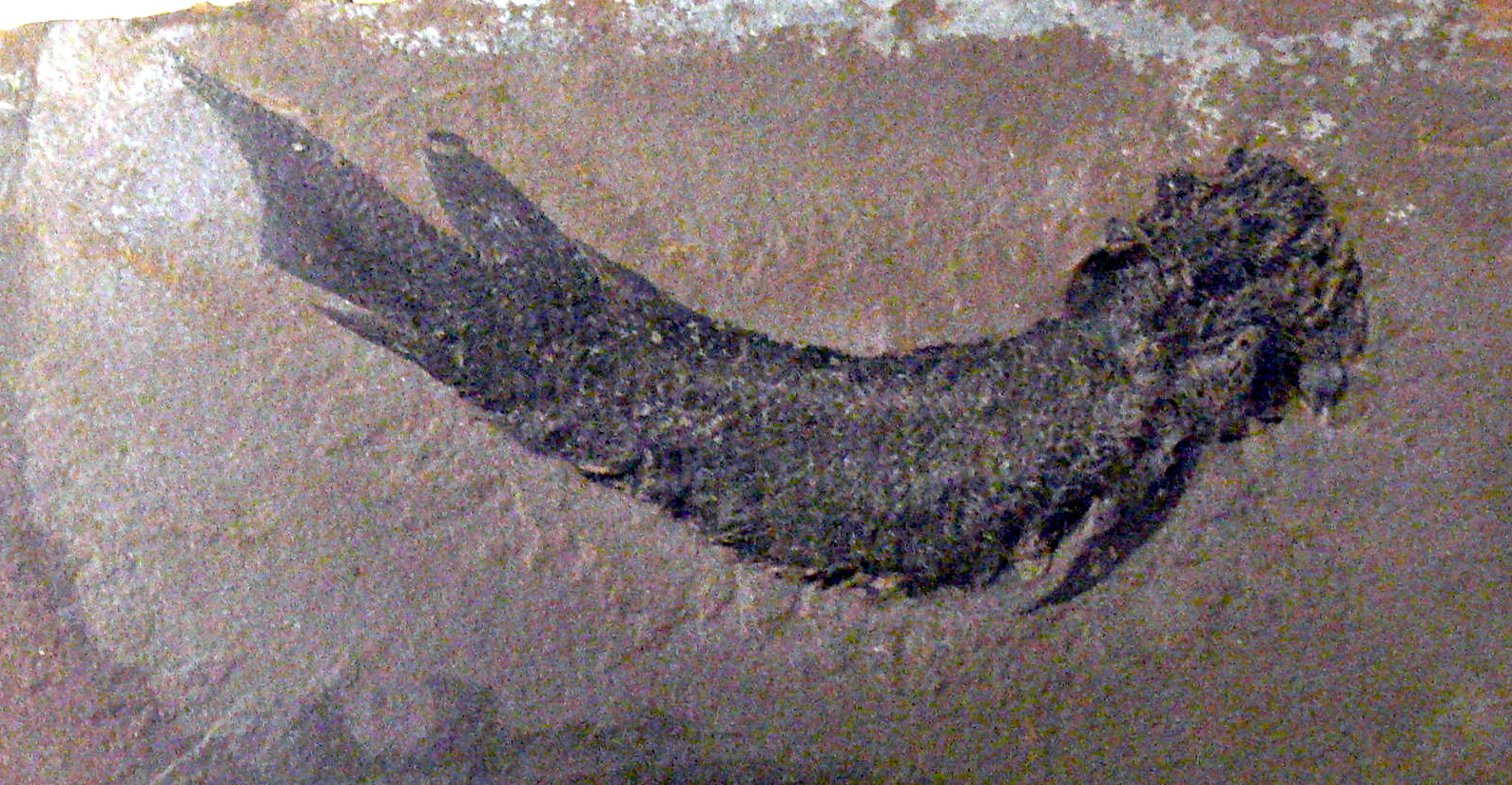
Dipterus

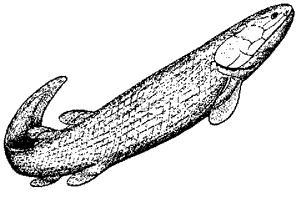
Ectosteorhachis

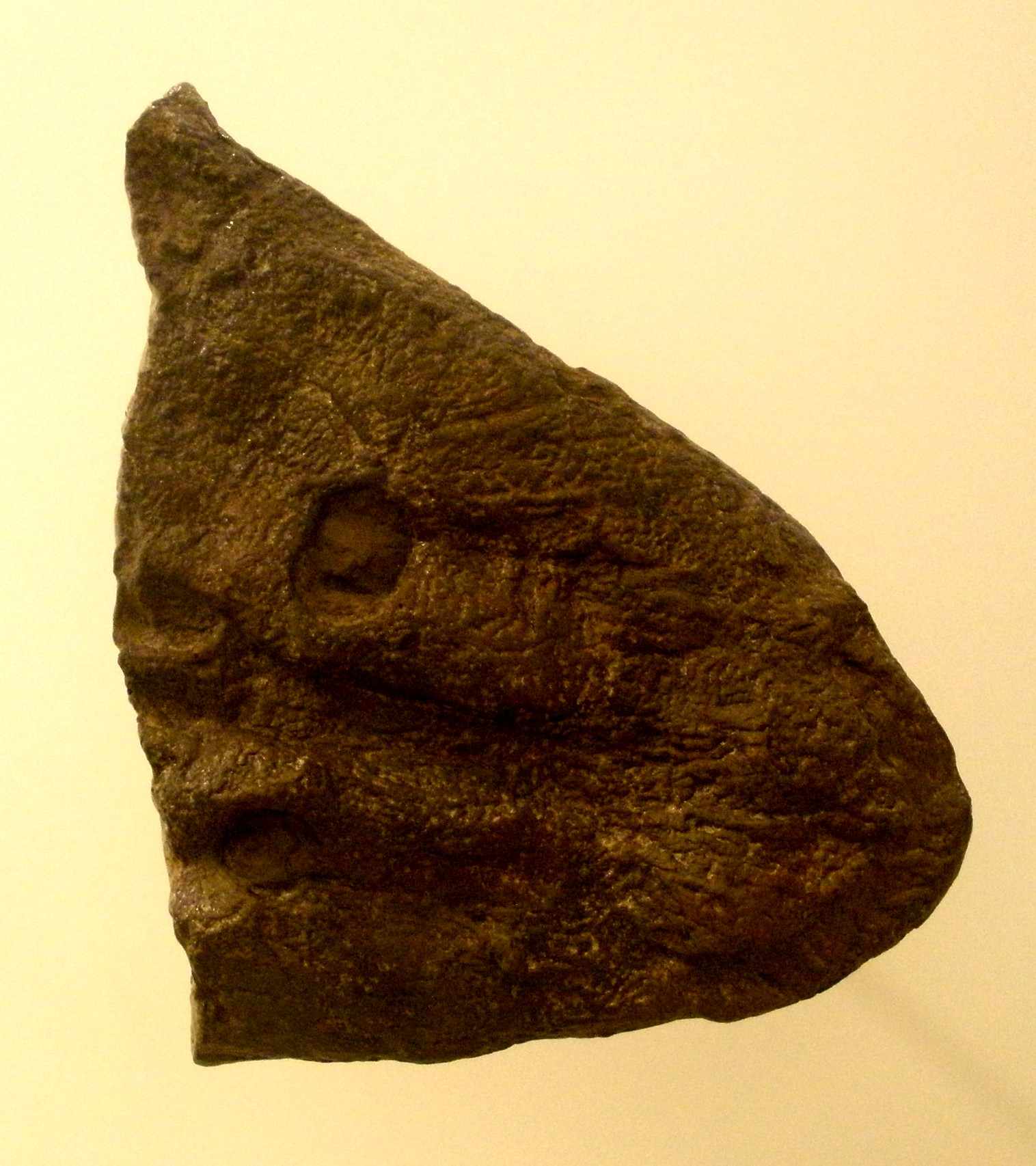
Skull of Elpistostege watsoni.

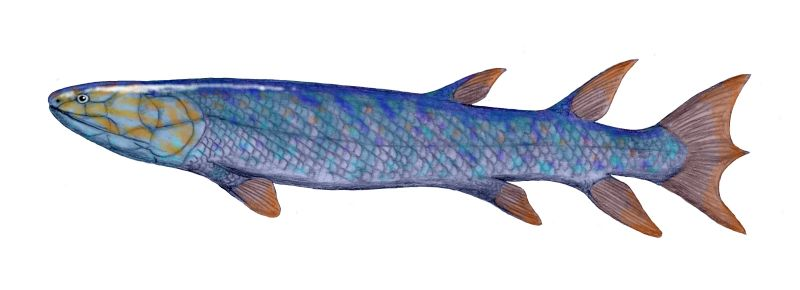
Life restoration of Eusthenopteron foordi

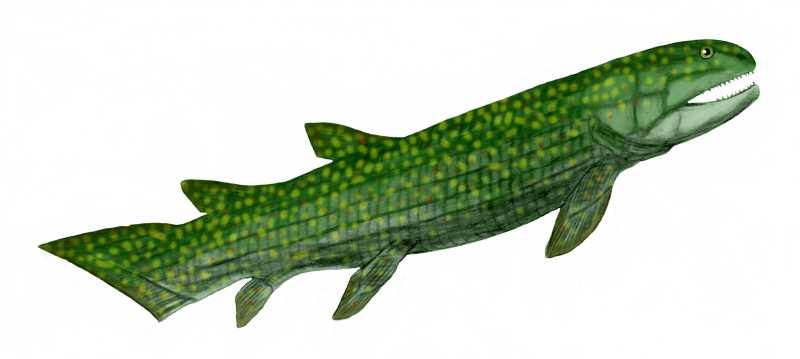
Gogonasus andrewsae

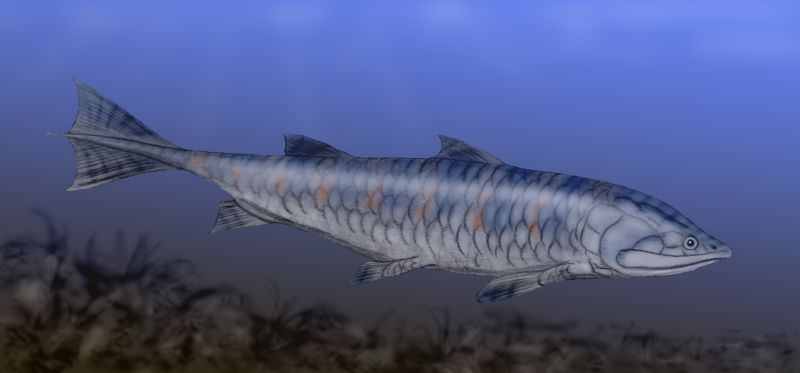
Grossius aragonensis

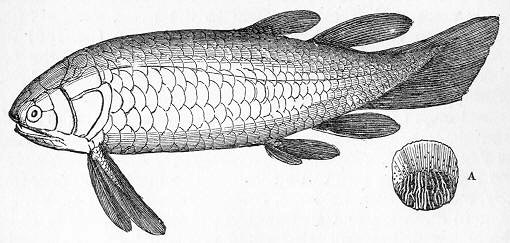
Holoptychius nobilissimus

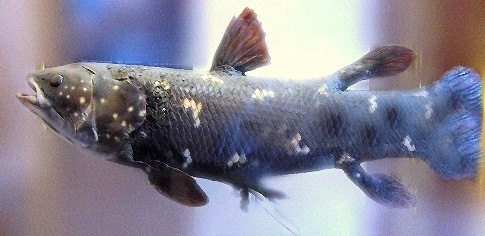
Latimeria chalumnae

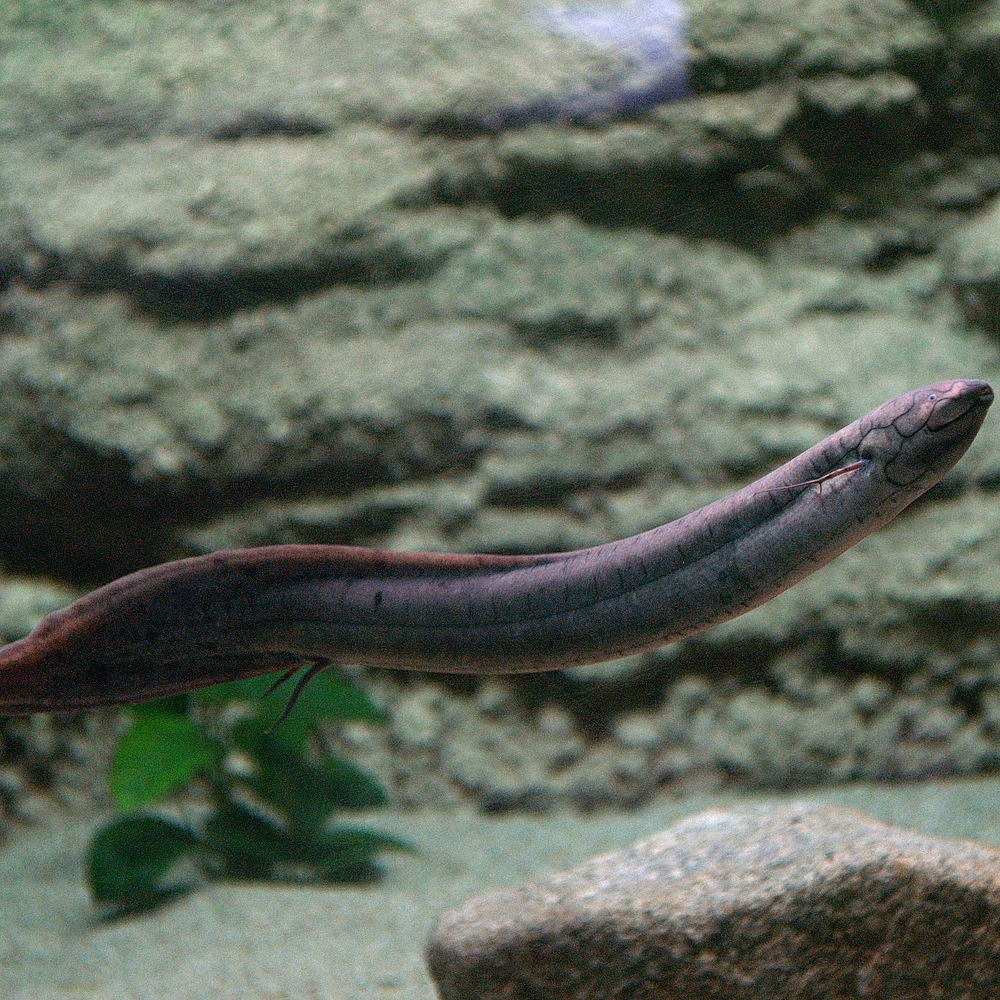
Lepidosiren paradoxa

== M - Z ==
Genus	Authors	Year	Status	Age	Location	Notes
Macropoma	Agassiz	1835	Valid.	Early Cretaceous to Late Cretaceous		
Macropomoides	Woodward	1942	Valid.	Late Cretaceous		
Mandageria	Johanson, Ahlberg	1997	Valid.	Late Devonian		
Mawsonia	Mawson, Woodward	1907	Valid.			
Megalichthys	Agassiz, Hilbert	1836	Valid.			
Megalocoelacanthus	Schwimmer, Stewart, Williams	1994	Valid.			
Megapleuron	Gaudry	1881	Valid.			
Megapomus	Vorobyeva	1977	Valid.	Late Devonian		
Megistolepis	Obruchev	1955	Valid.	Late Devonian		
Melanognathus	Jarvik	1967	Valid.	Early Devonian		
Metaceratodus	Chapman	1914	Valid.			
Metaxygnathus	Campbell, Bell	1977	Valid.	Late Devonian		
Microceratodus	Teixeira	1954	Valid.			
Miguashaia	Schultze	1973	Valid.	Late Devonian		
Mioceratodus	Kemp	1992	Valid.			
Moenkopia	Schaeffer, Gregory	1961	Valid.			
Monongahela	Lund	1970	Valid.			
Muranjilepis	Young, Schultze	2005	Valid.			
Mylacanthus	Stensiö	1921	Valid.	Early Triassic		
Namatozodia	Kemp	1993	Valid.			
**Neoceratodus**	Krefft	1870	Valid.	Present		
Nesides	Stensiö	1937	Valid.	Late Devonian		
Nielsenia	Lehman	1959	Valid.			
Notorhizodon	Young, Long, Ritchie	1992	Valid.	Givetian to Middle Devonian		
Oervigia	Lehman	1959	Valid.			
Onychodus	Newberry	1857	Valid.	Early Devonian to Late Devonian		
Orlovichthys	Krupina	1980	Valid.			
Osteolepis	Valenciennes	1829	Valid.	Middle Devonian to Late Devonian		
Osteoplax	M'Coy	1848	Valid.			
Palaedaphus		XXXX	Valid.			
Palaeophichthys	Eastman	1908	Valid.			
Panderichthys	Gross	1941	Valid.	Middle Devonian to Late Devonian		
Paraceratodus	Lehman	1959	Valid.			
Pentlandia	Watson, Day	1916	Valid.			
Phaneropleuron	Huxley	1859	Valid.			
Pillararhynchus	Campbell, Barwick	1990	Valid.			
Piveteauia	Lehman	1952	Valid.	Early Triassic		
Platycephalichthys	Vorobyeva-Blokhina	1959	Valid.			
Polyosteorhynchus	Lund, Lund	1984	Valid.	Mississippian		
Porolepis	Woodward	1891	Valid.	Middle Devonian to Late Devonian		
Powichthys	Jessen	1975	Valid.	Early Devonian		
Proceratodus	Romer, Smith	1935	Valid.			
**Protopterus**	Owen	1839	Valid.	Present		
Psarolepis	Yu	1998	Valid.	Pridoli to Early Devonian		
Pseudosauripterus	White	1961	Valid.			
Ptychoceratodus	Jaekel	1926	Valid.			
Qingmenodus	Jing Lu, Min Zhu	2010	Valid.	Early Devonian		
Quebecius	Schultze	1973	Valid.	Late Devonian		
Retodus	Churcher, De Iuliis, Kleindienst	2006	Valid.			
Rhabdoderma	Reis	1888	Valid.			
Rhinodipterus	Gross	1953	Valid.			
Rhipis	Saint-Seine	1950	Valid.			
Rhizodus	Owen	1840	Valid.	Pennsylvanian		
Rhynchodipterus	Säve-Söderbergh	1937	Valid.			
Sagenodus	Owen	1867	Valid.			
Sassenia	Stensiö	1921	Valid.	Early Triassic		
Sauripterus	Hall	1843	Valid.			
Scaumenacia	Traquair	1893	Valid.			
Scleracanthus	Stensiö	1921	Valid.	Early Triassic		
Screbinodus	Andrews	1985	Valid.			
Shoshonia	Friedman, Coates, Anderson	2007	Valid.			
Sinocoelacanthus	Liu	1964	Valid.	Early Triassic		
Soederberghia	Lehman	1959	Valid.			
Sorbitorhynchus	Wang, Drapala, Barwick, Campbell	1993	Valid.			
Spermatodus	Cope	1894	Valid.			
Straitonia	Thomson	1965	Valid.			
Strepsodus	Young	1866	Valid.			
Strunius	Jessen	1966	Valid.	Middle Devonian to Late Devonian		
Styloichthys	Zhu, Yu	2002	Valid.	Lochkovian to Early Devonian		
Sunwapta	Thomson	1967	Valid.			
Synaptotylus	Echols	1963	Valid.			
Tarachomylax	Barwick, Campbell, Mark-Kurik	1997	Valid.			
Thursius	Traquair	1888	Valid.	Middle Devonian		
Ticinepomis	Rieppel	1980	Valid.	Middle Triassic		
Tiktaalik	Daeschler, Shubin, Jenkins	2006	Valid.	Late Devonian		
Trachymetopon	Hennig	1939	Valid.			
Tranodis	Thomson	1965	Valid.			
Tristichopterus	Egerton	1861	Valid.			
Undina	Münster	1834	Valid.	Late Triassic to Early Cretaceous		
Uranolophus	Denison	1968	Valid.	Late Devonian	North America	
Ventalepis	Schultze	1980	Valid.			
Westollrhynchus	Schultze	2001	Valid.			
Whiteia	Moy-Thomas	1935	Valid.	Early Triassic		
Wimania	Stensiö	1921	Valid.	Early Triassic		
Youngichthys	Wanng, Liu	1981	Valid.			
Youngolepis	Chang, Yu	1981	Valid.	Early Devonian	Asia	

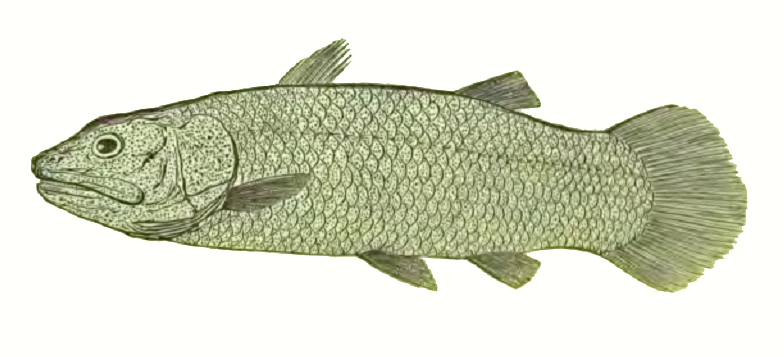
Macropoma

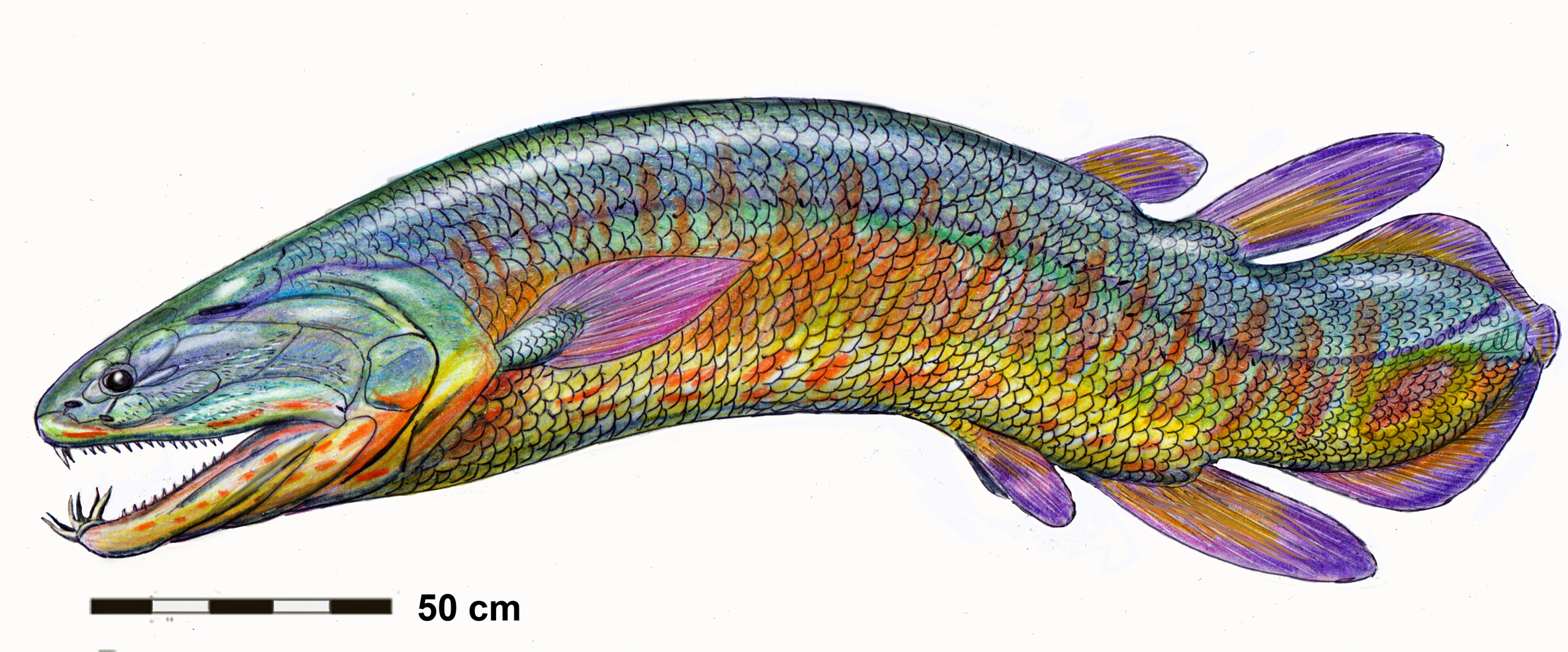
Onychodus

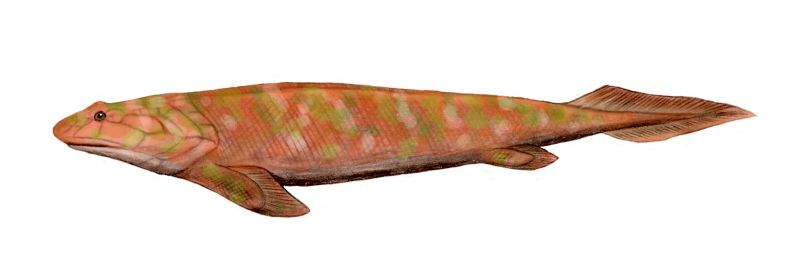
Restoration of Panderichthys

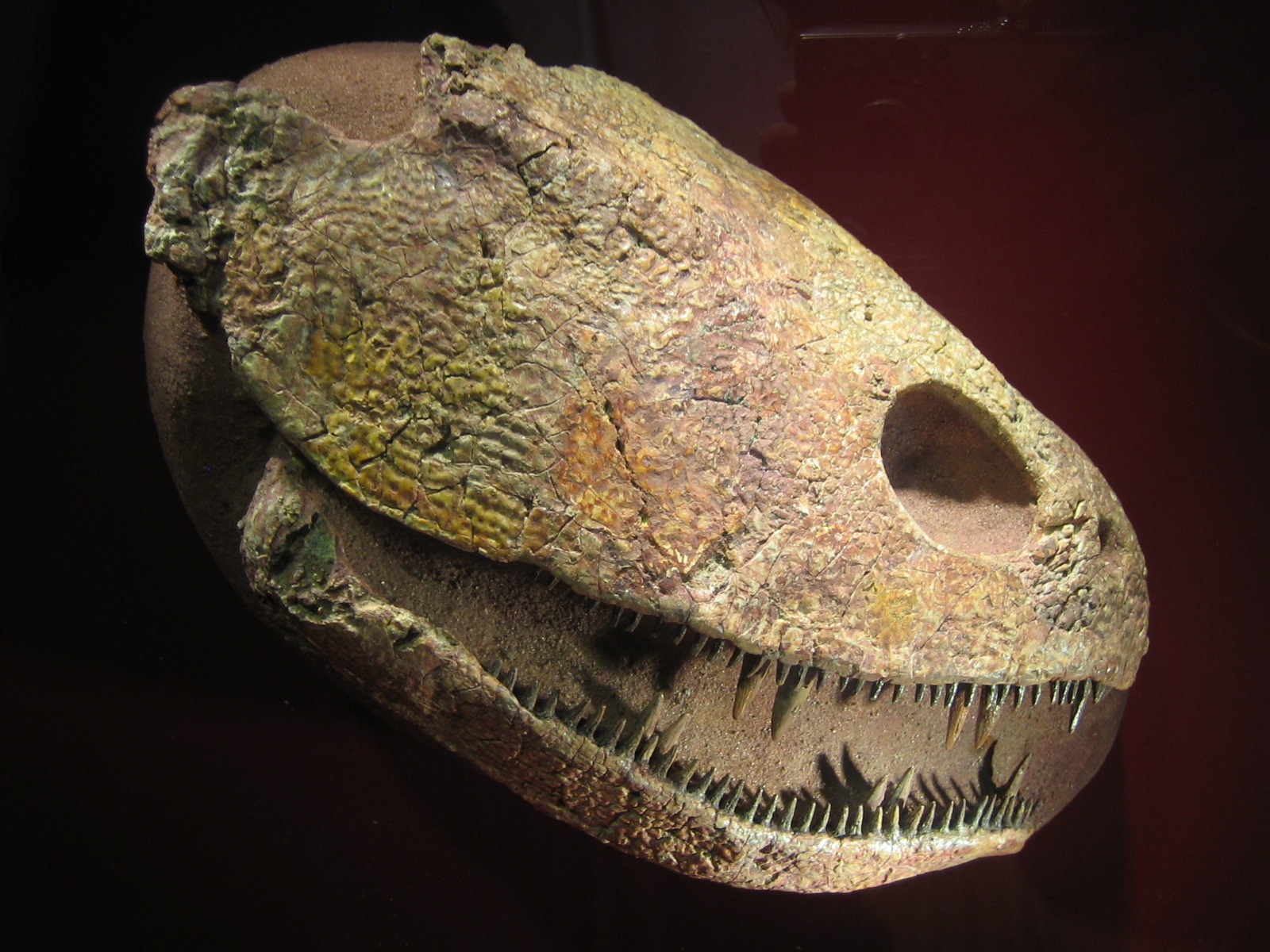
Skull of Platycephalichthys

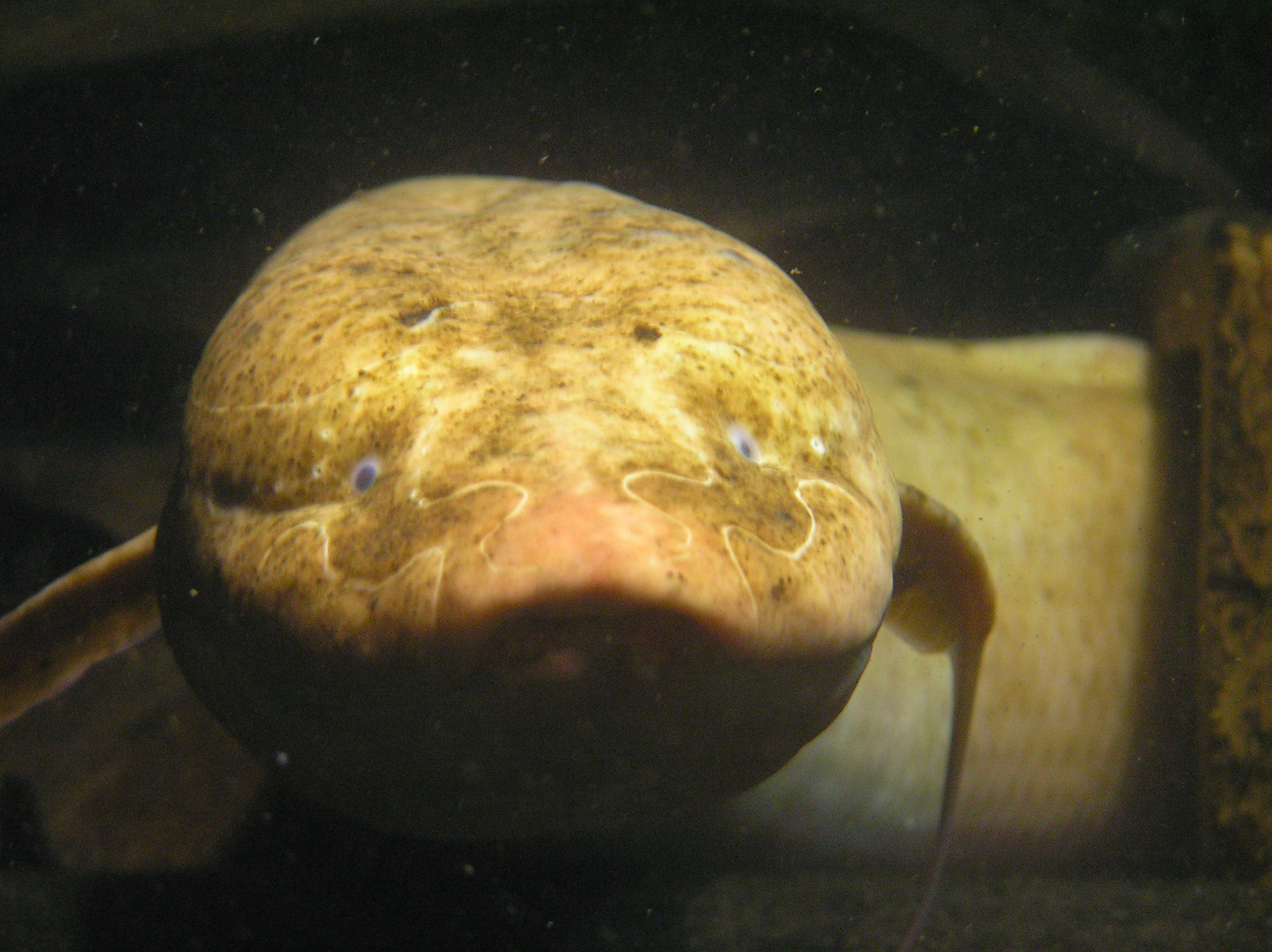
Protopterus sp.

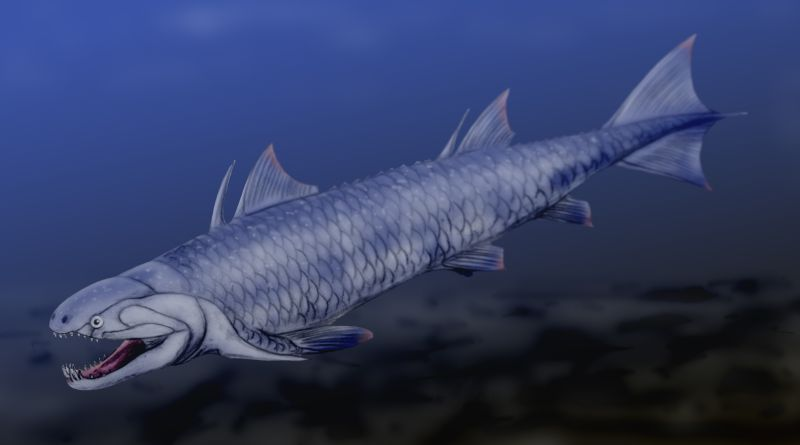
Psarolepis romeri

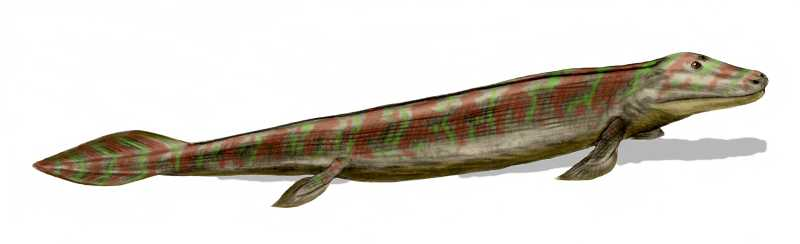
Reconstruction of Tiktaalik

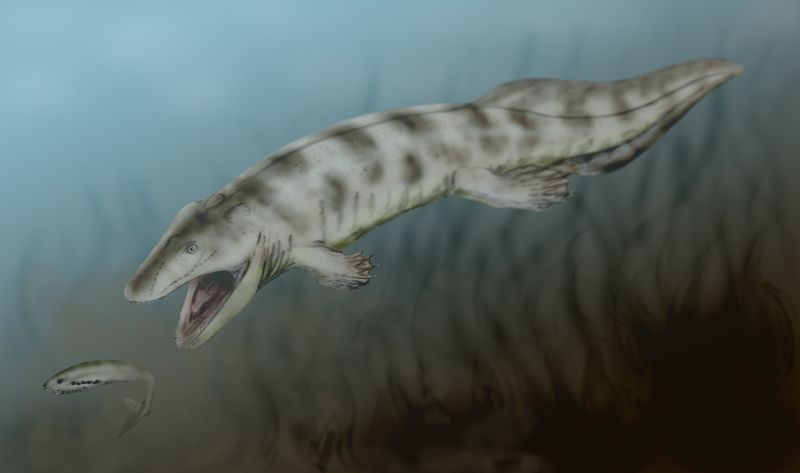
Ventastega curonica

== See also ==
- List of prehistoric bony fish
