= 1837 in paleontology =

List of years in paleontology	(table)
- … 1827; 1828; 1829; 1830; 1831; 1832; 1833; 1834; 1835; 1836; 1837; 1838; 1839; 1840; 1841; 1842; 1843; 1844; 1845; 1846; 1847 …
- In science 1834 1835 1836 1837 1838 1839 1840
- Art; Archaeology; Architecture; Literature; Music; Philosophy; Science; +...

Paleontology or palaeontology is the study of prehistoric life forms on Earth through the examination of plant and animal fossils. This includes the study of body fossils, tracks (ichnites), burrows, cast-off parts, fossilised feces (coprolites), palynomorphs and chemical residues. Because humans have encountered fossils for millennia, paleontology has a long history both before and after becoming formalized as a science. This article records significant discoveries and events related to paleontology that occurred or were published in the year 1837.

== Archosauromorphs ==
=== Newly named dinosaurs ===
Data courtesy of George Olshevsky's dinosaur genera list.

Name	Novelty	Status	Authors	Age	Unit	Location	Notes	Images
Plateosaurus	Gen. et sp. nov.	Valid	Christian Erich Hermann von Meyer	Late Triassic	Feuerletten Formation, Fleming Fjord Formation, Knollenmergel, Marnes Irisees Superieures Formation, Obere Bunte Mergel Stubensandstein, Trossingen Formation	France, Norway, Germany, Greenland, Switzerland	German paleontologist Hermann von Meyer formally named and described Plateosaurus. This was the first described prosauropod, and is still the one we know most about.	

== Synapsids ==
=== Newly named mammals ===
==== Afrotherians ====
Name	Status	Authors	Age	Location	Notes	Images
Gomphotherium	Valid	Burmeister	Early Miocene to Early Pliocene	Ethiopia; Austria; Saudi Arabia; China; Czech Republic; Egypt; France; Germany; India; Kenya; Mexico; Namibia; North Korea; Pakistan; Poland; Portugal; Romania; Russia; Spain; Switzerland; Thailand; Tunisia; Turkey; Ukraine; USA (California, Colorado, Florida, Kansas, Louisiana, Maryland, Nebraska, Nevada, New Mexico, Oregon, South Dakota and Texas); Nicaragua	A gomphothere.	Gomphotherium
