= 1841 in paleontology =

List of years in paleontology	(table)
- … 1831; 1832; 1833; 1834; 1835; 1836; 1837; 1838; 1839; 1840; 1841; 1842; 1843; 1844; 1845; 1846; 1847; 1848; 1849; 1850; 1851 …
- In science 1838 1839 1840 1841 1842 1843 1844
- Art; Archaeology; Architecture; Literature; Music; Philosophy; Science; +...

Paleontology or palaeontology is the study of prehistoric life forms on Earth through the examination of plant and animal fossils. This includes the study of body fossils, tracks (ichnites), burrows, cast-off parts, fossilised feces (coprolites), palynomorphs and chemical residues. Because humans have encountered fossils for millennia, paleontology has a long history both before and after becoming formalized as a science. This article records significant discoveries and events related to paleontology that occurred or were published in the year 1841.

== Dinosaurs ==
- On June 30, Sir Richard Owen presents his findings regarding some enormous bones that the Reverend William Buckland had acquired at an earlier date. He names the new genus to which these bones belong "Cetiosaurus." This event marks the first scientific description of a sauropod.
- Owen presents his treatise on British fossil reptiles to the British Association in August. This treatise marks the creation of a taxon called "Dinosauria."

=== Newly named dinosaurs ===
Name	Status	Authors	Location	Notes	Images
Cardiodon	Nomen dubium	Sir Richard Owen,	UK	Possible subjective synonym of Cetiosaurus	
Cetiosaurus	Valid	Sir Richard Owen,	France; Switzerland; Morocco; UK	A European Sauropod	Cetiosaurus.
Cladeiodon	Misidentification	Sir Richard Owen,	Germany	Dubious non-dinosaurian archosaur.	
Suchosaurus	Nomen dubium	Sir Richard Owen	England; Portugal	Possible subjective synonym of Baryonyx.	

== Plesiosaurs ==
=== New taxa ===
Name	Status	Authors	Location	Notes	Images
Pliosaurus	Valid	Owen	Argentina; Chile; France; Norway; Poland; Russia; Tunisia; UK	A Giant Pliosaur.	Pliosaurus
Polyptychodon	Valid	Owen	Czech Republic; France; Germany; Japan; Russia; Switzerland; UK		
"Thaumatosaurus"	Valid	Meyer			

== Synapsids ==
=== Non-mammalian ===
Name	Status	Authors	Age	Location	Notes	Images
Rhopalodon	Valid	Fischer				
