= 1828 in paleontology =

List of years in paleontology	(table)
- … 1818; 1819; 1820; 1821; 1822; 1823; 1824; 1825; 1826; 1827; 1828; 1829; 1830; 1831; 1832; 1833; 1834; 1835; 1836; 1837; 1838 …
- In science 1825 1826 1827 1828 1829 1830 1831
- Art; Archaeology; Architecture; Literature; Music; Philosophy; Science; +...

Paleontology or palaeontology is the study of prehistoric life forms on Earth through the examination of plant and animal fossils. This includes the study of body fossils, tracks (ichnites), burrows, cast-off parts, fossilised feces (coprolites), palynomorphs and chemical residues. Because humans have encountered fossils for millennia, paleontology has a long history both before and after becoming formalized as a science. This article records significant discoveries and events related to paleontology that occurred or were published in the year 1828.

== Dinosaurs ==
- Arcisse de Caumont discovers Megalosaurus fossils in the Jurassic oolite of Caen, Normandy. This marks the first recognized dinosaur discovery in France.
