= Paleolophus =

Paleolophus Temporal range: Early Devonian, Late Pragian, 411.82–410.62 Ma

Scientific classification
- Kingdom: Animalia
- Phylum: Chordata
- Class: Dipnoi
- Genus: †Paleolophus; Qiao et al, 2025

Type species
- †Paleolophus yunnanensis Qiao et al, 2025

Extinct genus of fishes

Paleolophus is an extinct genus of early lungfish from the early Devonian of China. The only remains of the genus, a well preserved skull, were found within the Posongchong Formation at a locality of the formation located in Zhaotong City, Yunnan. Paleolophus was a very basal lungfish, with it sharing features seen in both the basal-most lungfish, Diabolepis, and other later Devonian members of the group. Due to this mix of features, Paleolophus represents the rapid diversification of lungfish that took place during the early Devonian. Based on the anatomy of the skull, the fish had a strong, palatal bite. There is only one species assigned to the genus: P. yunnanensis.

== History and naming ==
The holotype of Paleolophus, a well-preserved skull, was collected from a locality within the Qingmen village in Zhaotong City, Yunnan belonging to the Early Devonian Posongchong Formation. After collection, this specimen (IVPP V17917) was housed within the Institute of Vertebrate Paleontology and Paleoanthropology, Beijing, China. The skull of the lungfish was later described by Tuo Qiao and coauthors in 2025. Along with describing Paleolophus itself, the well preserved holotype allowed for the reinterpretation of some features of the genus Uranolophus that had been previously argued about.

The generic name of Paleolophus translates to "old crest" in reference to both its old age and crest-like ridges located on the lateral edges of the palate.

== Description ==
Paleolophus was not a large fish, with the complete skull of the holotype measuring 25 millimetres (0.98 in) in length. The skull is at its widest near the supratemporal bones, where its width is almost equal with its length. The prepineal region of the skull makes up about one third of the skull's length which is similar to what is seen in Uranolophus. The back of the skull roof, like in other lungfish, is made up of a number of bones. The B bone is a large, hexagonal bone that is positioned at the midline of the skull. Two other bones, the I bones, meet one another posterior to the B bone at its midline. Both of these bones are very wide, being about twice as wide as they are long. The J bone is positioned laterally to the B bone and anteriorly to the I bones. The lateral-most bones of this section of the skull roof are the X,Y1, and Y2 bones in order from more anterior to posterior. Y2 is in contact with the I bone and all three of these bones are in contact with the J bone. The anterior-most of the three, the X bone, is only in contact with the J bone medioposteriorly. Unlike what is seen in the posterior section of the skull roof, the anterior bones that make it up are fused together. The supraorbital canal system begins towards the front of the skull where it is positioned at the midline, only to branch out towards the edges more posteriorly. There is a gap between this canal and the infraorbital canal, though this could be due to preservation. The anterior portion of the infraorbital canals located on the upper lip of the skull are linked together by the ethmoid commissure. The trunk lateral-line canals connect with the infraorbital canal. These canals start at the Y1,Y2, and X bones, only to curve when going through the X bone until they reach the other canal.

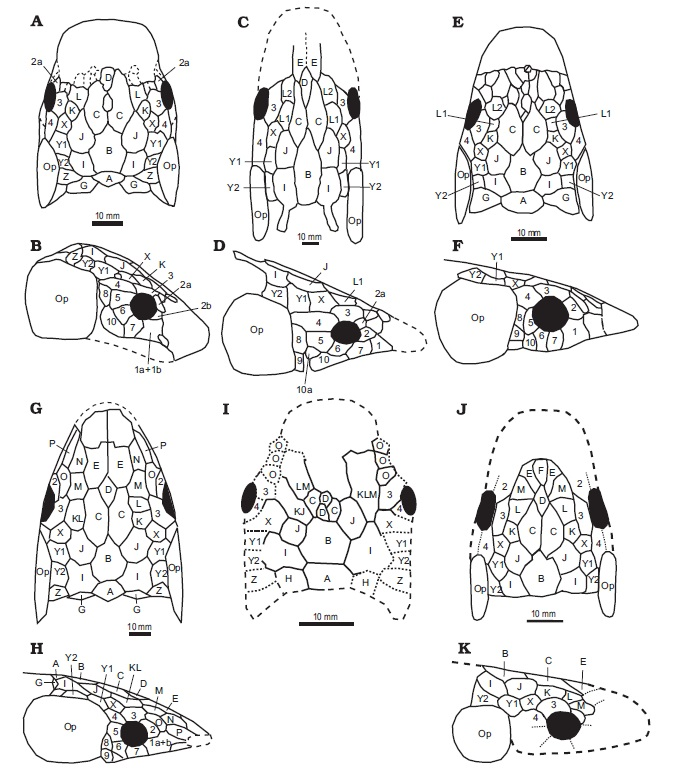
The skull roof of a number of Devonian Lungfish (not including Paleolophus) showing the position of bones that make up the skull roof.

The upper lip of the skull is split into three sections due to the paired anterior nares. The anterior-most section of the upper lip possesses a single row of low-crowned teeth. Located right behind these teeth are the vomers and large paired nasal cavities. Each of these cavities equal about one third of the length of the palate. The surface of the vomers have grooves which mark their attachment areas along with an internasal ridge. This ridge is short though is both taller and thinner than the ridge seen in Uranolophus. Mediolateral to the nasal canal is the postnasal wall which is thin, in contrast to the more basal Diabolepis. The palate of Paleolophus is overall similar to what is seen in Uranolophus, with the surface being covered by a large number of small cone-shaped denticles that are more worn down towards the middle of the palate. The posterior area of the palate contrasts this in being overall smooth. The parasphenoid is located along a majority of the palate. It is shaped like an elongate triangle. The pterygoids are located on each side of the parasphenoid, extending until just behind the vomers where they meet with a short suture. Internally, the palatoquadrate is fused to these bones. The palatoquadrate possesses a ridge that runs from the medial palatoquadrate margin to the front lateral edges of the bone. Two processes are located at the anterior portion of the ridge which suggests that the fish had a pars autopalatina. This combination of features suggests that Paleolophus had a strong ethmoid articulation. A chamber is located under the Y1 bone, with it most likely being where large adductor muscles were located. These muscles would have most likely went through a large embayment on the palatal margin of the skull, only to then connect to the lower jaw. Also supporting adductor muscles are a total of five cristae; two of these are positioned laterally, two dorsolaterally, and one medially. These anatomical features indicate that the fish had a strong, palatal bite. Two teardrop-shaped supraoptic cavities are located under the temporalis fossa. Behind these is a rough surface that most likely correlates to trunk muscles. The posterior-most portion of the skull, the basioccipital region, is not completely ossified at its midline with this forming an embayment that is most likely for the notochord.

=== Internal anatomy ===
The large nasal cavity of Paleolophus is connected to the cranial cavity via a short olfactory canal. Overall the cranial cavity is wide, though does narrow and rise posteriorly. The major part of the cavity holds cerebral hemispheres with the hypophysial organ being located under them. The hypophysial canal is located at the bottom of the brain where it extends downwards and backwards. The canals for the pituitary vein extend backwards and outwards from the previously mentioned canal. Posterior to the hemispheres are the parapineal and pineal canals with end at the skull roof. The foramen is located right behind the pineal canal, with this being for the optic nerve. Both the mesencephalon and diencephalon are short with their combined length only being about one third of the length of the skull. A pair of crescent-shaped cavities are located near the myelencephalon, these most likely housing the inner ears.

== Classification ==
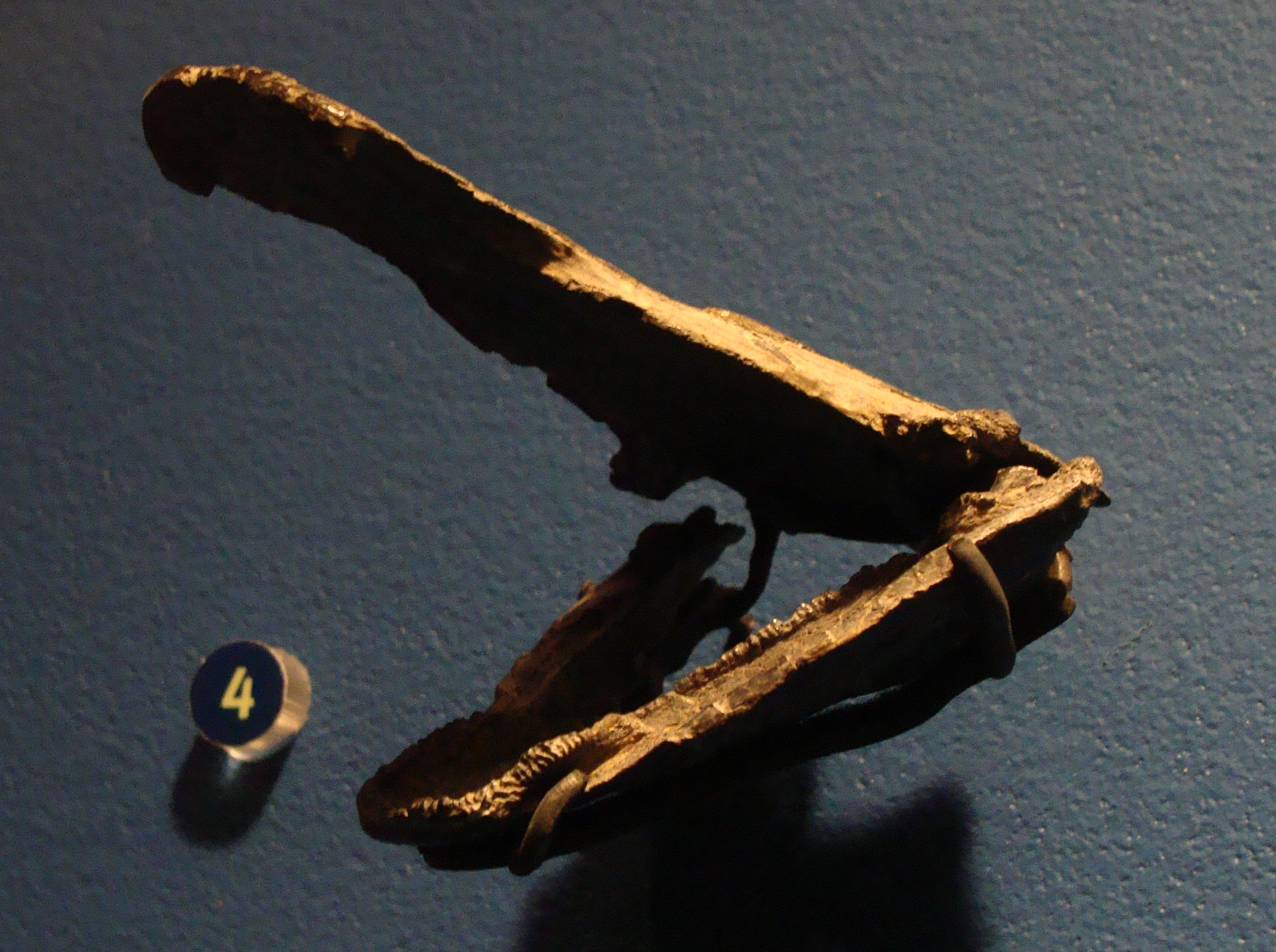
A specimen of Uranolophus, a very close relative of Palaeolophus

A large amount of the focus of Paleolophus within the description paper is what it means for lungfish evolution during the Devonian. The authors note a combination of features that show similarities to fish both within and right outside of Eudipnoi (a clade coined in the paper to represent all lungfish with an autostylic skull). While the fish has features in common with the more basal Diabolepis, including its anteriorly-fused skull along with the position of the vomers on the skull, it also has a very similar palate to what is seen in the later Uranolophus. Due to this combination of features, the authors suggest that the early evolution of lungfish was fairly rapid. The phylogeny position of Paleolophus was tested in the description paper with it being in a clade with Uranolophus. This clade is, in turn, sister to all other members of Eudipnoi which currently places them as the most basal members of the group. These similarities also suggest an Early Devonian dispersal of lungfish from Southern China to North America. This is also supported by two closely related dipnomorphs, Powichthys and Youngolepis, being found in North America and China respectively. The phylogeny within the 2025 description paper can be found below:

- - Guiyu oneiros
  - - Psarolepis romeri
    - - Porolepiformes
      - - Powichthys
        - - Youngolepis praecursor
          - - Diablolepis speratus
            - - - Uranolophus wyomingensis
                - Paleolophus yunnanensis
              - - - - Dipnorhynchus kiandrensis
                    - - - Archaeonectes pertusus
                        - Chirodipterus onawayensis
                      - - Dipnorhynchus canthlesae
                        - Dipnorhynchus kurikae
                  - - Ichnomylax kurnai
                    - - Speonesydrion iani
                      - Westollrhynchus lehmanni
                    - - Dipnorhynchus sussmilchi
                      - - Cathlorhynchus trismodipterus
                        - - Dipnotuberculus gnathodus
                - - Erikia jarviki
                  - - Tarachomylax oepiki
                    - - Stomiahykus thlaodus
                      - - Amadeodipterus kencampbelli
                        - - More derived lungfishes

== Paleoenvironment ==
The paleoenvironment of the Posongchong Formation has been well studied due to the presence of a very diverse assemblage of early plants. Overall, the ecosystem preserved in the sediments is coastal with channel deposits showing some sort of fluvial bodies of water were in the region. A number of plant species such as Eophyllophyton and Oricilla would have grown on the edges of these channels, most likely being transported into the marine environments by floods. These coasts would have most likely on an estuary, with some of the plants also being suggested to have come from marsh communities further inland. The neighboring more aquatic ecosystem would have been in shallow, brackish waters with a similar faunal composition to other early Devonian biotas in China. This being a high diversity in the jawless fish group Galeaspida along with early Placoderms and lobe-finned fish.
