= 1847 in paleontology =

List of years in paleontology	(table)
- … 1837; 1838; 1839; 1840; 1841; 1842; 1843; 1844; 1845; 1846; 1847; 1848; 1849; 1850; 1851; 1852; 1853; 1854; 1855; 1856; 1857 …
- In science 1844 1845 1846 1847 1848 1849 1850
- Art; Archaeology; Architecture; Literature; Music; Philosophy; Science; +...

Paleontology or palaeontology is the study of prehistoric life forms on Earth through the examination of plant and animal fossils. This includes the study of body fossils, tracks (ichnites), burrows, cast-off parts, fossilised feces (coprolites), palynomorphs and chemical residues. Because humans have encountered fossils for millennia, paleontology has a long history both before and after becoming formalized as a science. This article records significant discoveries and events related to paleontology that occurred or were published in the year 1847.

== Dinosaurs ==
=== Newly named dinosaurs ===
Name	Status	Authors	Notes
Macroscelosaurus	Misidentification.	Muenster vide von Meyer	An unpublished name for a misidentified prolacertiform reptile that was probably the same as Tanystropheus.
Sphenosaurus	Misidentification.	von Meyer	A misidentified procolophonid.

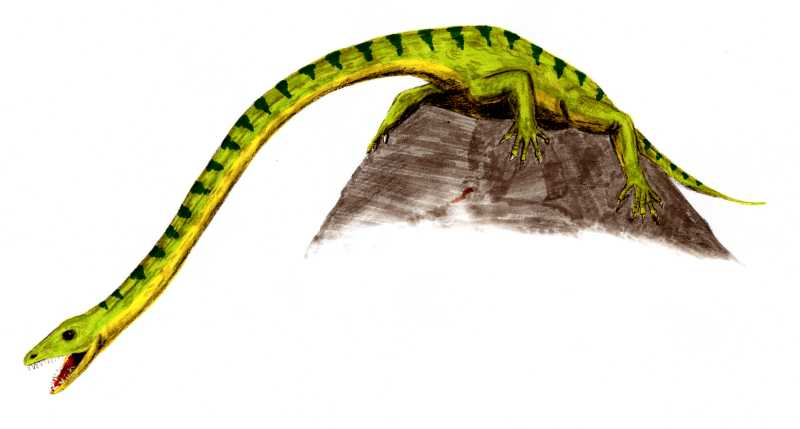
Macroscelosaurus is probably the same as Tanystropheus.

== Pterosaurs ==
- von Meyer erected the genus Rhamphorhynchus.

== Synapsids ==
=== Non-mammalian ===
Name	Status	Authors	Age	Location	Notes	Images
Dinosaurus	Valid	Fischer				
