= 1844 in paleontology =

List of years in paleontology	(table)
- … 1834; 1835; 1836; 1837; 1838; 1839; 1840; 1841; 1842; 1843; 1844; 1845; 1846; 1847; 1848; 1849; 1850; 1851; 1852; 1853; 1854 …
- In science 1841 1842 1843 1844 1845 1846 1847
- Art; Archaeology; Architecture; Literature; Music; Philosophy; Science; +...

Paleontology or palaeontology is the study of prehistoric life forms on Earth through the examination of plant and animal fossils. This includes the study of body fossils, tracks (ichnites), burrows, cast-off parts, fossilised feces (coprolites), palynomorphs and chemical residues. Because humans have encountered fossils for millennia, paleontology has a long history both before and after becoming formalized as a science. This article records significant discoveries and events related to paleontology that occurred or were published in the year 1844.

== Archosauromorphs ==
=== Newly named phytosaurs ===
Data courtesy of George Olshevsky's dinosaur genera list.

Name	Status	Authors		Notes
Termatosaurus	Nomen dubium	von Meyer	Plieninger	Actually a dubious genus of crocodile-like phytosaur, similar to the Rutiodon pictured to the right.

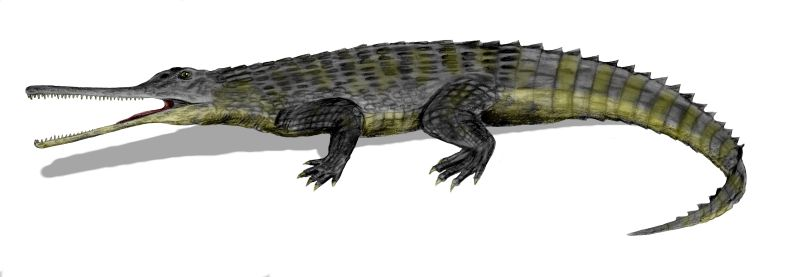
Rutiodon, a relative of Termatosaurus.

== Pterosaurs ==
=== New taxa ===
Name	Status	Authors	Age	Unit	Location	Notes
Palaeornis	Preoccupied	Mantell	Early Cretaceous Valanginian)	Grinstead Clay Formation	United Kingdom	An indeterminate azhdarchoid.
