= 1848 in paleontology =

List of years in paleontology	(table)
- … 1838; 1839; 1840; 1841; 1842; 1843; 1844; 1845; 1846; 1847; 1848; 1849; 1850; 1851; 1852; 1853; 1854; 1855; 1856; 1857; 1858 …
- In science 1845 1846 1847 1848 1849 1850 1851
- Art; Archaeology; Architecture; Literature; Music; Philosophy; Science; +...

Paleontology or palaeontology is the study of prehistoric life forms on Earth through the examination of plant and animal fossils. This includes the study of body fossils, tracks (ichnites), burrows, cast-off parts, fossilised feces (coprolites), palynomorphs and chemical residues. Because humans have encountered fossils for millennia, paleontology has a long history both before and after becoming formalized as a science. This article records significant discoveries and events related to paleontology that occurred or were published in the year 1848.

== Dinosaurs ==
=== Newly named dinosaurs ===
Name	Status	Authors	Location	Notes	Images
Regnosaurus	Valid	Mantell	England		Regnosaurus is believed to have looked similar to Huayangosaurus

== See also ==
- 1848
