= Holodipterus =

Holodipterus Temporal range: Frasnian to Famennian

Scientific classification
- Kingdom: Animalia
- Phylum: Chordata
- Class: Dipnoi
- Family: †Holodontidae
- Genus: †Holodipterus; White & Moy-Thomas, 1940

Type species
- †Holodus kiprijanowae Pander, 1858

Species
- See text

Synonyms
- Holodus Pander, 1858 (preocc.)

Extinct genus of fishes

Holodipterus is an extinct genus of prehistoric marine lungfish from the Late Devonian of eastern Europe and Australia. The genus name was originally coined to replace "Holodus" Pander, 1858, which was already preoccupied.

The following species are known:

- †H. elderae Pridmore, 1994 - Early Frasnian of Western Australia, Australia (Gogo Formation)
- †H. gogoensis Miles, 1977 - Early Frasnian of Western Australia, Australia (Gogo Formation)
- †H. kiprijanowae (Pander, 1858) (type species) - Middle Famennian of Oryol, Russia (Dankov-Lebedyan Beds)
- †H. santacrucensis Gorizdro-Kulczycka, 1950 - Middle Famennian of Poland (Holy Cross Mountains)

The species H. meemannae from the Gogo Formation is now placed in its own genus, Asthenorhynchus. It is likely that this genus is paraphyletic, and that the two Australian species likely belong in a different genus.

One specimen of H. gogoensis has a well-preserved braincase that preserves numerous nerve canals, including olfactory canals.

== See also ==
- Sarcopterygii
- List of sarcopterygians
- List of prehistoric bony fish
