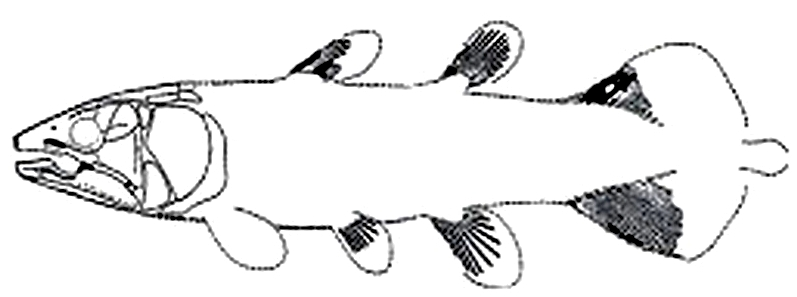
- Skeletal diagram of Diplocercides heiligenstockiensis
- Skull diagram of Diplocercides kayseri

Scientific classification
- Kingdom: Animalia
- Phylum: Chordata
- Class: Actinistia
- Family: †Diplocercididae
- Genus: †Diplocercides; Stensiö, 1922

Species
- D. heiligenstockiensis Jessen, 1966; D. kayseri von Koenen, 1895; D. jaekeli Stensiö, 1922

= Diplocercides =

Diplocercides Temporal range: Frasnian to middle Famennian

Extinct genus of fishes

Diplocercides is an extinct genus of marine coelacanth which lived during the Late Devonian period.

== Taxonomy ==
The following species are known:

- D. heiligenstockiensis Jessen, 1966 - Frasnian of Germany (Bergisch Gladbach Formation)
- D. kayseri (von Koenen, 1895) - late Frasnian of Germany (Kellwasserkalk Formation) and early to middle Famennian of Poland (Holy Cross Mountains) (=Nesides schmidti Stensio 1937)
- D. jaekeli Stensiö, 1922 - Frasnian of Germany (Bergisch Gladbach Formation)

Indeterminate remains are known from the Frasnian of Iran. Specimens from South Africa that were formerly assigned to this genus have since been described in their own genus, Serenichthys. Another alleged specimen from the Frasnian-aged Gogo Formation of Australia was also later described in its own genus, Ngamugawi. The species D. davisi Moy-Thomas, 1937, from the Mississippian of Ireland, which was formerly thought to be the only post-Devonian species, is now thought to represent a subadult Rhabdoderma, indicating that Diplocercides likely went extinct by the End-Devonian extinction.

== Description ==
Fossils of the species D. kayseri are known to have three-dimensionally preserved cranial endocasts, making it one of the only known coelacanths aside from the extant Latimeria where the shape of the brain is known. These endocasts have been destroyed by serial grinding, but still survive as wax mounts. In 2010, three-dimensional specimens of tentative Diplocercides were described from the Gogo Formation of Western Australia, with these also containing preserved endocasts; these were later described in their own genus, Ngamugawi.
