= Tranodis =

Scientific classification
- Domain: Eukaryota
- Kingdom: Animalia
- Phylum: Chordata
- Clade: Sarcopterygii
- Order: Crossopterygii
- Genus: †Tranodis; Thomson, 1965

Species
- Tranodis castrensis Thomson, 1965

Extinct genus of fishes

Tranodis is an extinct genus of lungfish known from fossils from the Lower Carboniferous (late Mississippian) of North America and Scotland.

== See also ==
- Sarcopterygii
- List of sarcopterygians
- List of prehistoric bony fish
