= Proceratodus =

Scientific classification
- Domain: Eukaryota
- Kingdom: Animalia
- Phylum: Chordata
- Clade: Sarcopterygii
- Genus: †Proceratodus; Romer & Smith, 1935

Extinct genus of fishes

Proceratodus is an extinct genus of prehistoric sarcopterygians or lobe-finned fish.

== See also ==
- Sarcopterygii
- List of sarcopterygians
- List of prehistoric bony fish
