= Orlovichthys =

Scientific classification
- Domain: Eukaryota
- Kingdom: Animalia
- Phylum: Chordata
- Clade: Sarcopterygii
- Class: Dipnoi
- Genus: †Orlovichthys; Krupina, 1980

Extinct genus of fishes

Orlovichthys is an extinct genus of prehistoric sarcopterygians or lobe-finned fish. Fossil evidence was found in Russia, and is from the Late Devonian period.

== See also ==
- Sarcopterygii
- List of sarcopterygians
- List of prehistoric bony fish
