= Stomiahykidae =

Stomiahykidae Temporal range: Devonian

Scientific classification
- Kingdom: Animalia
- Phylum: Chordata
- Class: Dipnoi
- Family: †Stomiahykidae; Bernacsek, 1977

Genera
- †Archaeonectes; †Stomiahykus

Extinct family of fishes

Stomiahykidae is an extinct family of prehistoric lungfishes which lived during the Devonian period.
