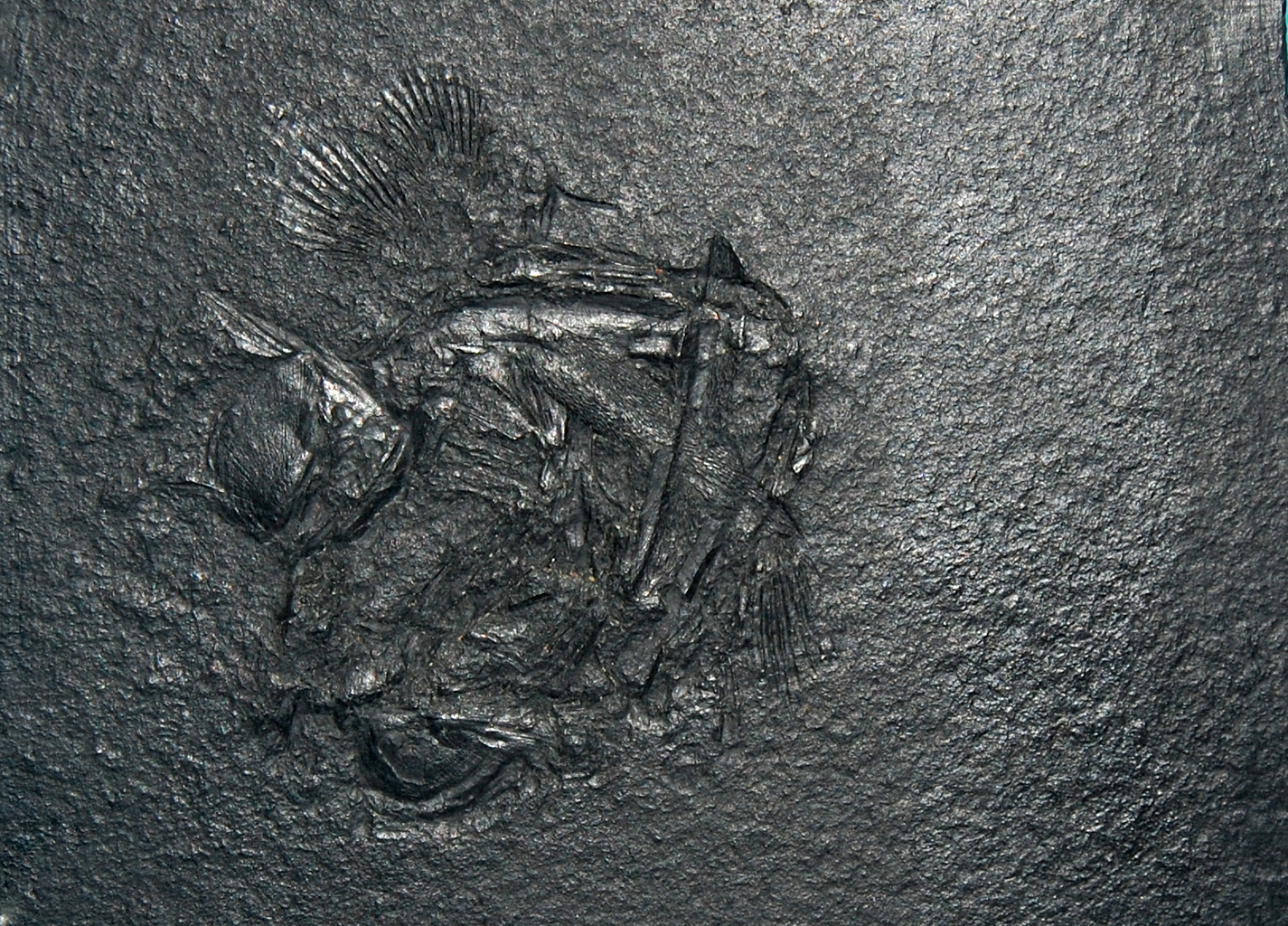
- Specimen of G. callopterus, Natural History Museum, Vienna

Scientific classification
- Kingdom: Animalia
- Phylum: Chordata
- Class: Actinistia
- Order: Coelacanthiformes
- Genus: †Graphiurichthys; White & Moy-Thomas, 1937
- Species: †G. callopterus

Binomial name
- †Graphiurichthys callopterus (Kner, 1866)

Synonyms
- †Graphiuricthys White & Moy-Thomas, 1937; †Graphiurus Kner, 1866

= Graphiurichthys =

Graphiurichthys Temporal range: Early Carnian

Extinct genus of fishes

Graphiurichthys is an extinct genus of marine coelacanth known from the Late Triassic of Europe. It contains a single species, G. callopterus, from the Carnian-aged Raibl Formation of Austria. It is among the few coelacanths to display expanded fin rays.

== See also ==
- Prehistoric fish
- List of prehistoric bony fish
