= Straitonia =

Scientific classification
- Domain: Eukaryota
- Kingdom: Animalia
- Phylum: Chordata
- Clade: Sarcopterygii
- Order: Crossopterygii
- Family: †Sagenodontidae
- Genus: †Straitonia; Thomson, 1965

Extinct genus of fishes

Straitonia is an extinct genus of prehistoric sarcopterygian, or lobe-finned fish.

== See also ==
- Sarcopterygii
- List of sarcopterygians
- List of prehistoric bony fish
