= Youngichthys =

Youngichthys Temporal range: Changhsingian

Scientific classification
- Domain: Eukaryota
- Kingdom: Animalia
- Phylum: Chordata
- Clade: Sarcopterygii
- Class: Actinistia
- Genus: †Youngichthys; Wang et Liu, 1981

Type species
- †Youngichthys xinghuainsis Wang et Liu, 1981

Extinct genus of fishes

Youngichthys is an extinct genus of prehistoric sarcopterygians or lobe-finned fish from the upper Permian (Changhsingian) comprising a single species, Youngichthys xinghuansis. A single specimen of the fish was discovered in Zhejiang Province, China in 1981.

== See also ==
- Sarcopterygii
- List of sarcopterygians
- List of prehistoric bony fish
