= Hainbergia =

Hainbergia Temporal range: Middle Triassic (Anisian)

Scientific classification
- Kingdom: Animalia
- Phylum: Chordata
- Class: Actinistia
- Order: Coelacanthiformes
- Genus: †Hainbergia; Schweizer, 1966
- Species: †H. granulata

Binomial name
- †Hainbergia granulata Schweizer, 1966

Extinct genus of fishes

Hainbergia is an extinct genus of prehistoric marine coelacanth from the Middle Triassic of Europe. It contains a single species, H. granulata from the Anisian-aged Muschelkalk of Germany. It is known from a complete skeleton.

== See also ==
- Sarcopterygii
- List of sarcopterygians
- List of prehistoric bony fish
