= Monongahela (fish) =

Scientific classification
- Kingdom: Animalia
- Phylum: Chordata
- Clade: Sarcopterygii
- Genus: †Monongahela; Lund, 1970

Extinct genus of fishes

Monongahela is an extinct genus of prehistoric sarcopterygians or lobe-finned fish. There are currently no confirmed surviving specimens.

== See also ==
- Sarcopterygii
- List of sarcopterygians
- List of prehistoric bony fish
