= Rhipis =

Scientific classification
- Domain: Eukaryota
- Kingdom: Animalia
- Phylum: Chordata
- Clade: Sarcopterygii
- Class: Actinistia
- Order: Coelacanthiformes
- Family: †Mawsoniidae
- Genus: †Rhipis; Saint-Seine, 1950

Extinct genus of fishes

Rhipis is an extinct genus of prehistoric sarcopterygians or lobe-finned fish.

== See also ==
- Sarcopterygii
- List of sarcopterygians
- List of prehistoric bony fish
