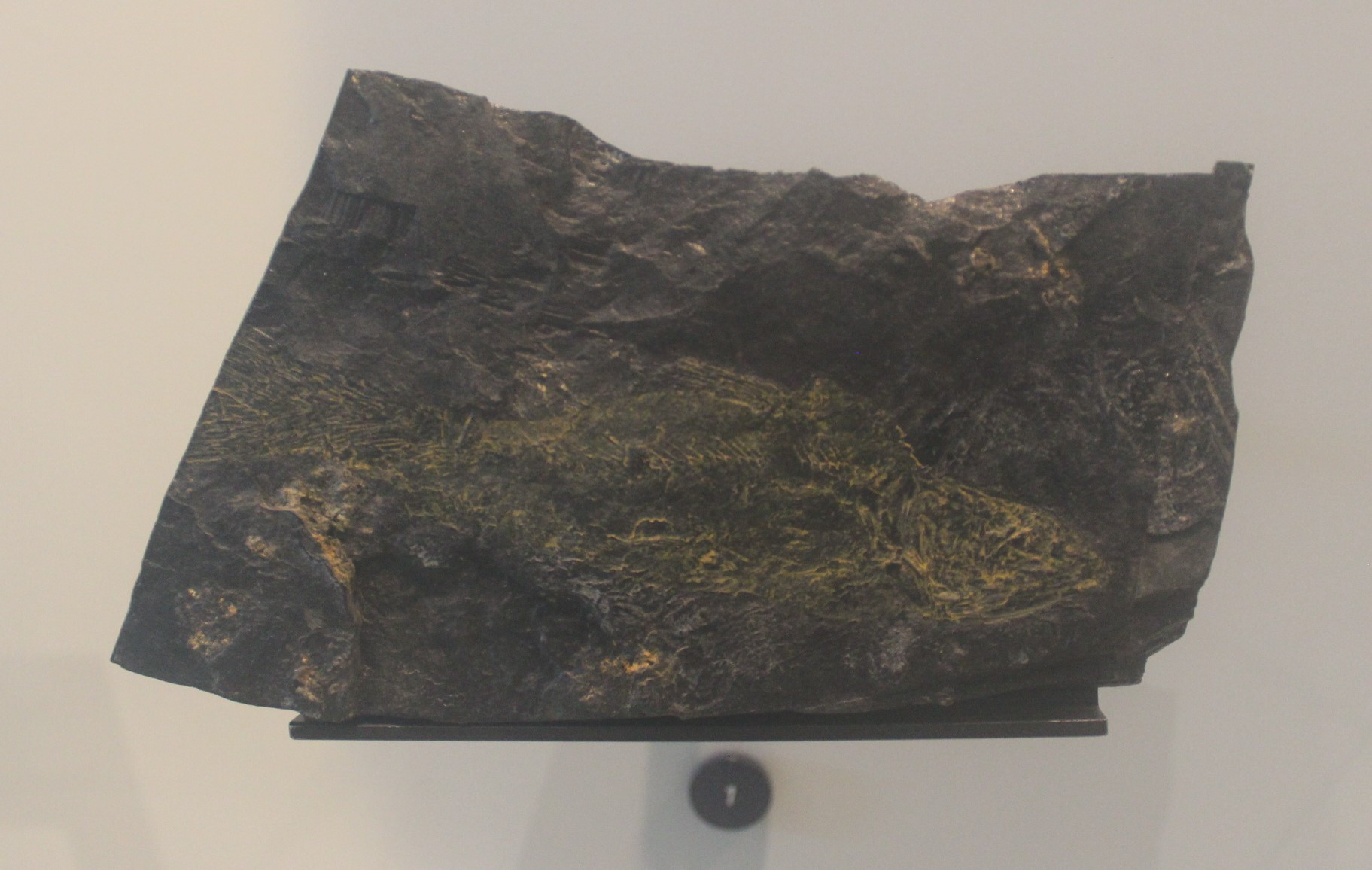
- R. elegans fossil, American Museum of Natural History
- Skull diagram of R. elegans

Scientific classification
- Kingdom: Animalia
- Phylum: Chordata
- Class: Actinistia
- Order: Coelacanthiformes
- Family: †Rhabdodermatidae
- Genus: †Rhabdoderma; Reis, 1888

Type species
- Coelacanthus elegans (Newberry, 1856)

Other species
- †R. alderingi Moy-Thomas, 1937; †R. ardrossense Moy-Thomas, 1937; †R. exiguum? (Eastman, 1902); †R. huxleyi (Traquair, 1881); †R. madagascariensis (Woodward, 1910); †R. newelli? (Hibbard, 1933); †R. tinglyense Davis, 1884

Synonyms
- †Dumfregia

= Rhabdoderma =

Rhabdoderma Temporal range: Carboniferous-Early Triassic

Extinct genus of coelacanths

Rhabdoderma is an extinct genus of coelacanth fish in the class Sarcopterygii. Fossils of Rhabdoderma have been found in Europe, Madagascar and North America, in Carboniferous and Early Triassic (Induan) aged rocks, with a hiatus in between. The type species was originally described as Coelacanthus elegans. Five species are considered valid in 1981.

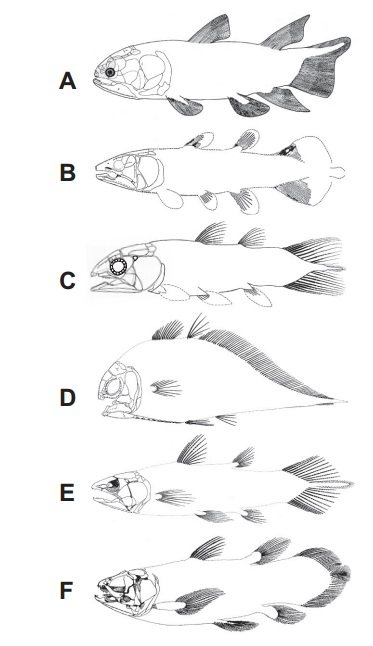
Restoration of coelacanth fishes: E, Rhabdoderma

== Bibliography ==
- Discovering Fossil Fishes by John Maisey and John G. Maisey

== See also ==
- Sarcopterygii
- List of sarcopterygians
- List of prehistoric bony fish
