= Nesides =

Scientific classification
- Kingdom: Animalia
- Phylum: Chordata
- Class: Actinistia
- Order: Coelacanthiformes
- Genus: †Nesides; Stensiö, 1937

Extinct genus of fishes

Nesides is an extinct genus of prehistoric sarcopterygians or lobe-finned fish.

== See also ==
- Sarcopterygii
- List of sarcopterygians
- List of prehistoric bony fish
