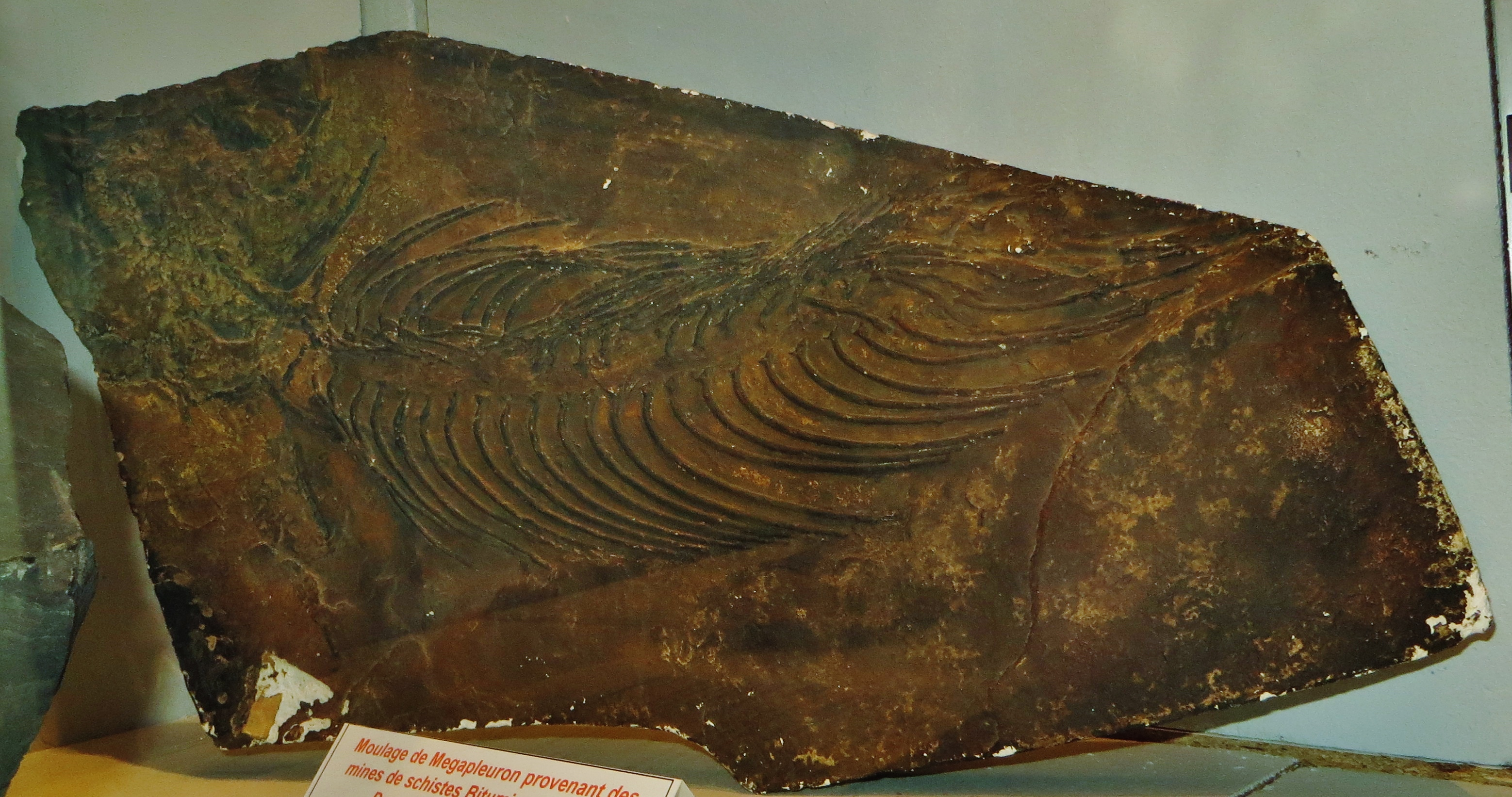
- Megapleuron rochei fossil

Scientific classification
- Domain: Eukaryota
- Kingdom: Animalia
- Phylum: Chordata
- Clade: Sarcopterygii
- Class: Dipnoi
- Genus: †Megapleuron; Gaudry, 1881

Type species
- †Megapleuron rochei Gaudry, 1881

= Megapleuron =

Megapleuron Temporal range: Asselian

Extinct genus of fishes

Megapleuron is an extinct genus of prehistoric sarcopterygian or lobe-finned fish that lived during the Asselian age of the Cisuralian (early Permian) epoch in what is now Burgundy, France.

== See also ==
- Sarcopterygii
- List of sarcopterygians
- List of prehistoric bony fish
