= Sunwapta (fish) =

Scientific classification
- Domain: Eukaryota
- Kingdom: Animalia
- Phylum: Chordata
- Clade: Sarcopterygii
- Order: Crossopterygii
- Genus: †Sunwapta; Thomson, 1967

Extinct genus of fishes

Sunwapta is an extinct genus of prehistoric sarcopterygians or lobe-finned fish.

== See also ==
- Sarcopterygii
- List of sarcopterygians
- List of prehistoric bony fish
