= Eoctenodus =

Scientific classification
- Kingdom: Animalia
- Phylum: Chordata
- Clade: Sarcopterygii
- Genus: †Eoctenodus; Hills, 1929

Extinct genus of fishes

Eoctenodus is an extinct genus of prehistoric sarcopterygian or lobe-finned fish.

== See also ==
- Sarcopterygii
- List of sarcopterygians
- List of prehistoric bony fish
