= Shoshonia =

Shoshonia Temporal range: Devonian

Scientific classification
- Domain: Eukaryota
- Kingdom: Animalia
- Phylum: Chordata
- Clade: Osteichthyes
- Genus: †Shoshonia; Friedman, Coates & Anderson, 2007

Extinct genus of fishes

Shoshonia is a Devonian-era extinct genus of prehistoric sarcopterygians, or lobe-finned fish. It contains one species, Shoshonia arctopteryx. The fish was named in reference to the Shoshoni people and the Shoshone National Forest in Wyoming, in the United States.

The fish was described from a fossilized pectoral fin endoskeleton and shoulder bones found in Wyoming. Based on skeletal morphology, the fish are believed to have been ancestors of the coelacanths. Notably, the fins were asymmetric.

== See also ==
- Sarcopterygii
- List of sarcopterygians
- List of prehistoric bony fish
