= Marnes Irisees Superieures Formation =

Geological formation in France

- Stratigraphic range: Upper Triassic
- Type: Geological formation

The Marnes Irisees Superieures Formation is a geological formation in France. It dates back to the Late Triassic .

== Vertebrate fauna ==
Dinosaurs of the Marnes Irisees Superieures Formation
Taxa	Presence	Notes	Images
Genus: Plateosaurus; 1. P. longiceps	1. Found in the Departement Du Doubs and Departement Du Jura.		Plateosaurus Thecodontosaurus
Infraorder: Prosauropoda; 1. ?Thecodontosaurus sp.; 2. Indeterminate remains.	1. Found in the Departement De L'Ain.; 2. Found in the Departement Du Jura.	1. Placeholder.; 2. Formerly called Dimodosaurus poligniensis.	Plateosaurus Thecodontosaurus

== See also ==
- List of dinosaur-bearing rock formations
