= Palaeophichthys =

Palaeophichthys Temporal range: Late Moscovian

Scientific classification
- Kingdom: Animalia
- Phylum: Chordata
- Class: Actinopterygii
- Order: †Tarrasiiformes
- Genus: †Palaeophichthys; Eastman 1908

Extinct genus of fishes

Palaeophichthys is an extinct genus of prehistoric bony fish that lived during the Desmoinsian stage of the Pennsylvanian epoch.

== See also ==
- Prehistoric fish
- List of prehistoric bony fish
