= Tarachomylax =

Scientific classification
- Kingdom: Animalia
- Phylum: Chordata
- Class: Dipnoi
- Genus: †Tarachomylax; Barwick, Campbell & Mark-Kurik, 1997

Extinct genus of fishes

Tarachomylax is an extinct genus of prehistoric sarcopterygians or lobe-finned fish.

== See also ==
- Sarcopterygii
- List of sarcopterygians
- List of prehistoric bony fish
