= Coelacanthopsis =

Coelacanthopsis Temporal range: Viséan

Scientific classification
- Kingdom: Animalia
- Phylum: Chordata
- Class: Actinistia
- Genus: †Coelacanthopsis; Traquair, 1901
- Species: †C. curta

Binomial name
- †Coelacanthopsis curta Traquair, 1901

Extinct genus of coelacanths

Coelacanthopsis is an extinct genus of marine coelacanth which lived during the early Carboniferous (Mississippian). It is known from one species, C. curta from the Viséan of Ardross, Scotland.

Some place it in the family Rhabdodermatidae. However, its taxonomic identity is generally considered uncertain.
