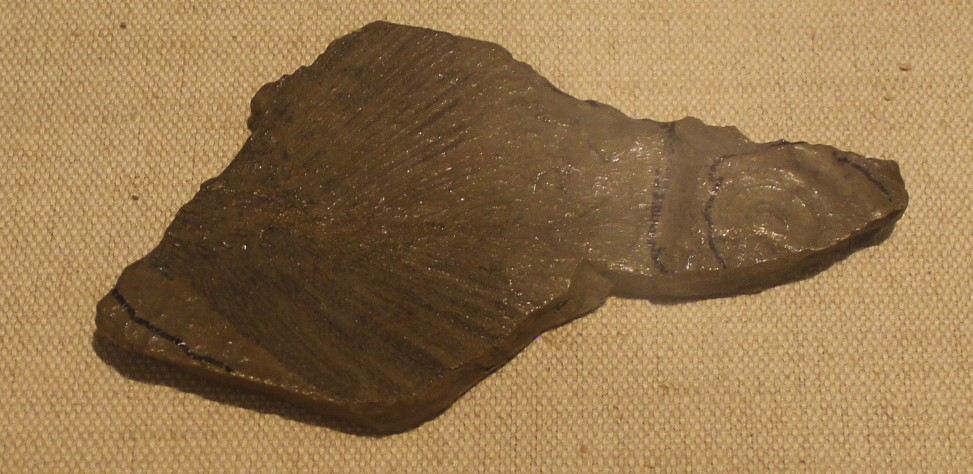
- S. fengshanensis tail (IVPP V2895), Paleozoological Museum of China

Scientific classification
- Domain: Eukaryota
- Kingdom: Animalia
- Phylum: Chordata
- Clade: Sarcopterygii
- Class: Actinistia
- Order: Coelacanthiformes
- Genus: †Sinocoelacanthus; Liu, 1964

= Sinocoelacanthus =

Sinocoelacanthus Temporal range: Early Triassic

Extinct genus of fishes

Sinocoelacanthus is an extinct genus of prehistoric coelacanth that lived during the Early Triassic epoch.

== See also ==
- Prehistoric fish
- List of prehistoric bony fish
