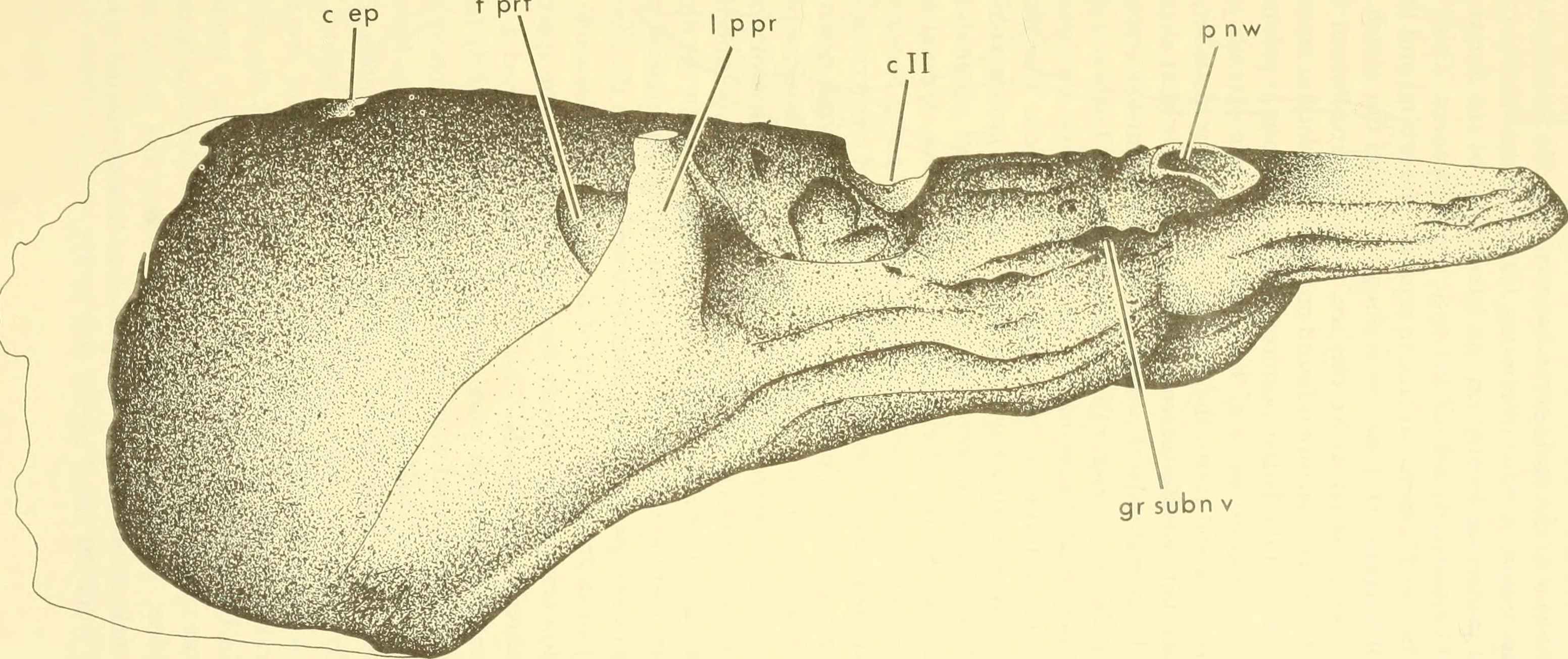
- Palate of D. suessmilchi

Scientific classification
- Kingdom: Animalia
- Phylum: Chordata
- Class: Dipnoi
- Family: †Dipnorhynchidae
- Genus: †Dipnorhynchus; Jaekel, 1927

Species
- See text

= Dipnorhynchus =

Dipnorhynchus Temporal range: Emsian

Extinct genus of fishes

Dipnorhynchus is an extinct genus of marine lungfish from the middle Devonian period (Emsian) of Australia.

The following species are known:

- D. (Placorhynchus) cathlesae Campbell & Barwick, 1999 - mid-Emsian of New South Wales (Bloomfield Limestone)
- D. kiandrensis Campbell & Barwick, 1982 - Emsian of New South Wales (Lick Hole Limestone)
- D. kurikae Campbell & Barwick, 1985 - mid-Emsian of New South Wales (Bloomfield Limestone)
- D. suessmilchi (Etheridge, 1906) (type species) - mid-Emsian of New South Wales (Bloomfield Limestone)

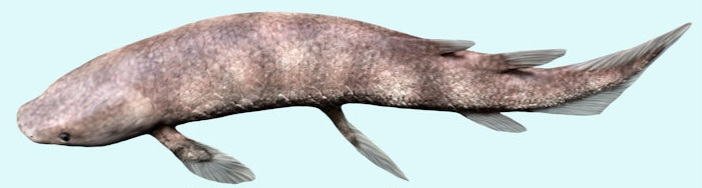
Life reconstruction of D. suessmilchi

The species 'D.' lehmanii from Germany was formerly placed in this genus, but has more recently been moved to its own genus, Westollrhynchus.

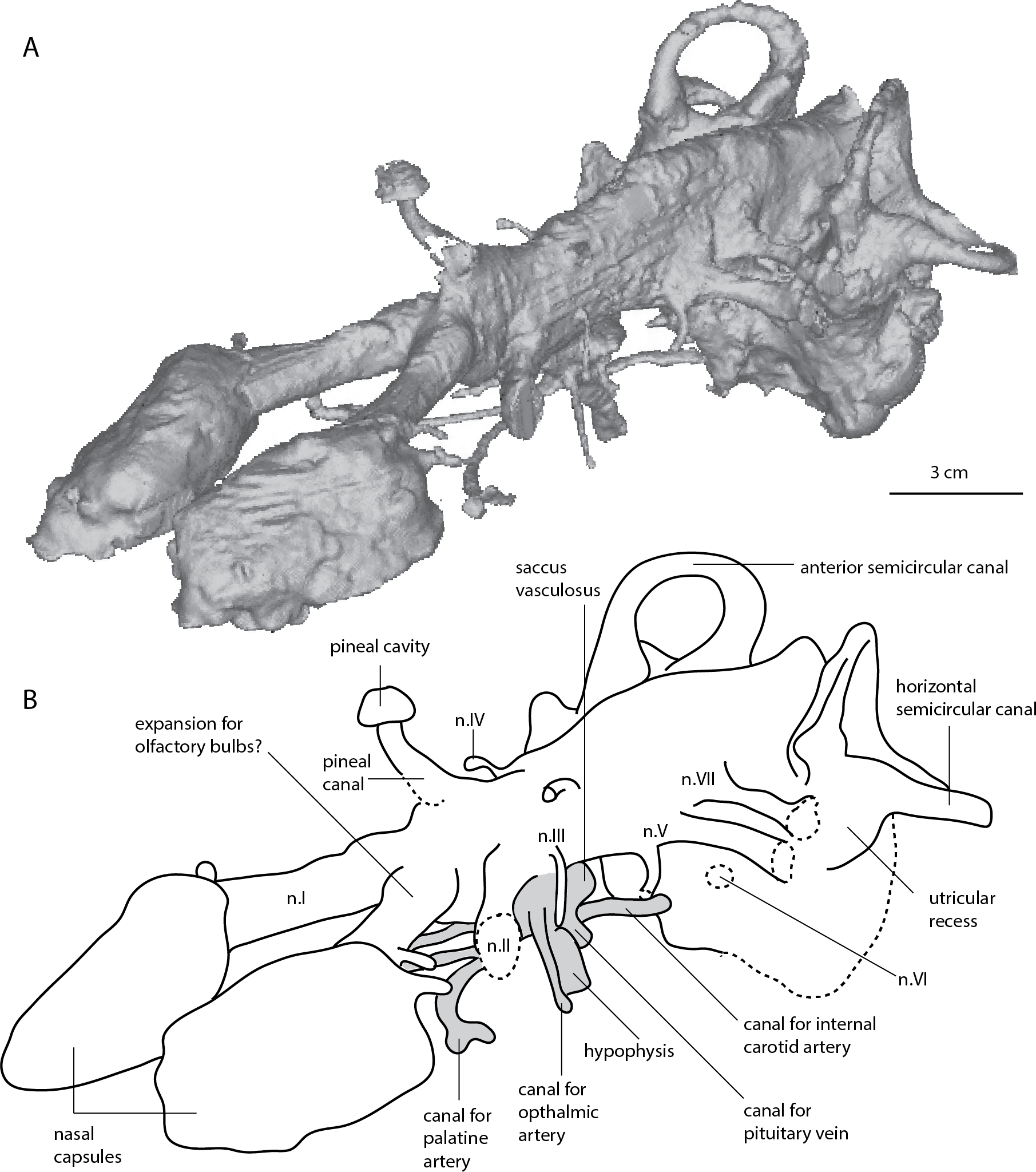
Endocast of D. suessmilchi

Dipnorhynchus was a primitive lungfish, but still it had features that set it apart from other sarcopterygians. Its skull lacked the joint that divided the skull in two in rhipidists and coelacanths. Instead, it was a solid bony structure similar to that of the first tetrapods. Instead of cheek teeth, Dipnorhynchus had tooth-like plates on the palate and lower jaw. Also like land vertebrates, the palate was fused with the brain case. It was relatively large for a lungfish, measuring 90 centimetres (3 ft) in length. D. cathlesae, the only member of the subgenus Placorhynchus, could grow to particularly large sizes.
