= Bogdanovia =

Bogdanovia Temporal range: Devonian

Scientific classification
- Kingdom: Animalia
- Phylum: Chordata
- Class: †Osteolepidida
- Order: †Osteolepiformes
- Genus: †Bogdanovia; Obrucheva, 1955

Type species
- †Bogdanovia orientalis Obrucheva, 1955

Extinct genus of fishes

Bogdanovia is an extinct genus of lobe-finned fish which lived during the Devonian period.
