= Langdenia =

Scientific classification
- Domain: Eukaryota
- Kingdom: Animalia
- Phylum: Chordata
- Clade: Sarcopterygii
- Genus: †Langdenia; Janvier & Phuong, 1999

Type species
- †Langdenia campylognatha Janvier & Phuong, 1999

Extinct genus of fishes

Langdenia is a genus of prehistoric lobe-finned fish.
