= 1847 in philosophy =

1847 in philosophy

== Publications ==
- Søren Kierkegaard, Works of Love (1847) and Edifying Discourses in Diverse Spirits (1847)

== Births ==
- August 20 - Bolesław Prus (died 1912)
- November 2 - Georges Sorel (died 1922)
