= Andreyevichthys =

Andreyevichthys Temporal range: Devonian

Scientific classification
- Domain: Eukaryota
- Kingdom: Animalia
- Phylum: Chordata
- Clade: Sarcopterygii
- Class: Dipnoi
- Family: †Phaneropleuridae
- Genus: †Andreyevichthys; Krupina, 1987

Type species
- †Andreyevichthys epitomus Krupina, 1987

Extinct genus of fishes

Andreyevichthys is an extinct genus of lungfish which lived during the Devonian period.
