= 1848 in philosophy =

1848 in philosophy

== Events ==
- Year of Revolutions of 1848.
- February 21 - Karl Marx and Friedrich Engels publish The Communist Manifesto (Manifest der Kommunistischen Partei) in London.

== Publications ==
- Auguste Comte, A General View of Positivism (Discours sur l'ensemble du positivisme)
- Søren Kierkegaard, The Point of View of My Work as an Author (written)
- Karl Marx and Friedrich Engels, The Communist Manifesto
- John Stuart Mill, Principles of Political Economy

== Births ==
- February 19 - Constance Jones, English philosopher and logician (d. 1922)
- March 16 - Carveth Read, English philosopher and logician (d. 1931)
- May 11 - Wilhelm Windelband, German philosopher (d. 1915)
- June 14 - Bernard Bosanquet, English philosopher (d. 1923)
- November 8 - Gottlob Frege, German mathematician, logician and philosopher (d. 1925)

== Deaths ==
- January 1 - Friedrich Karl Forberg, German atheist philosopher and classicist (b. 1770)
- June 7 - Vissarion Belinsky, Russian literary critic and philosopher (b. 1811)
- July 9 - Jaime Balmes, Spanish Catalan Catholic priest and philosopher (b. 1810)
- December 18 - Bernard Bolzano, Bohemian Catholic priest, mathematician and philosopher (b. 1781)
- Alexander Ivanovich Galich, Russian philosopher (b. 1783)
