= Archaeonectes =

Archaeonectes Temporal range: Devonian

Scientific classification
- Domain: Eukaryota
- Kingdom: Animalia
- Phylum: Chordata
- Clade: Sarcopterygii
- Class: Dipnoi
- Family: †Stomiahykidae
- Genus: †Archaeonectes; Meyer, 1858

Extinct genus of fishes

Archaeonectes is an extinct genus of lungfish which lived during the Devonian period.
