= Westollrhynchus =

Scientific classification
- Kingdom: Animalia
- Phylum: Chordata
- Class: Dipnoi
- Genus: †Westollrhynchus; Schultze, 2001

Extinct genus of fishes

Westollrhynchus is an extinct genus of prehistoric sarcopterygians or lobe-finned fish containing only one recognized species, Westollrhynchus lehmanni.

== See also ==
- Sarcopterygii
- List of sarcopterygians
- List of prehistoric bony fish
