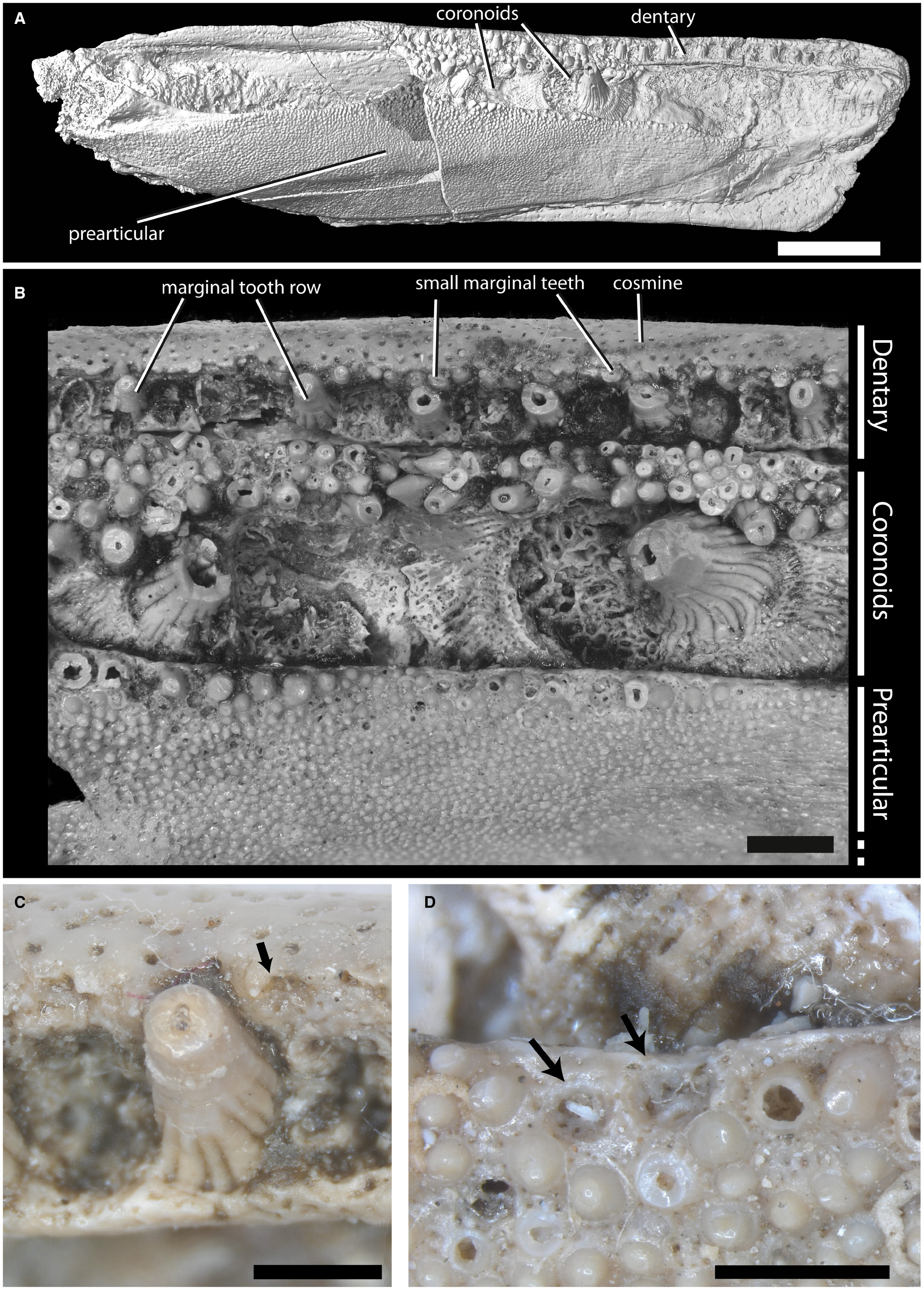
- Lower jaw of P. thorsteinssoni

Scientific classification
- Kingdom: Animalia
- Phylum: Chordata
- Clade: Dipnomorpha
- Genus: †Powichthys; Jessen, 1975

Type species
- P. thorsteinssoni Jessen, 1975

Species
- P. spitsbergensis Clément & Janvier 2004; P. thorsteinssoni Jessen 1975

= Powichthys =

Powichthys Temporal range: Devonian

Extinct genus of bony fishes

Powichthys is a genus of prehistoric lobe-finned fish which lived during the Devonian period. It was small in size, about 30 cm. Prior to the discovery of P. spitsbergensis in 2004, the genus was known from a single type species, P. thorsteinssoni.
