= Ichnomylax =

Ichnomylax Temporal range: Devonian

Scientific classification
- Kingdom: Animalia
- Phylum: Chordata
- Class: Dipnoi
- Family: †Speonesydrionidae
- Genus: †Ichnomylax; Long, Campbell & Barwick, 1994

Species
- I. kurnai (type) (Long, Campbell & Barwick, 1994); I. karatajae (Reisz, Krupina & Smith, 2004)

Extinct genus of fishes

Ichnomylax is an extinct genus of lungfish which lived during the Devonian period. Fossils have been found in Australia and Russia.
