= Sphenosaurus =

Sphenosaurus Temporal range: Late Permian, 252 Ma

Scientific classification
- Domain: Eukaryota
- Kingdom: Animalia
- Phylum: Chordata
- Clade: †Parareptilia
- Order: †Procolophonomorpha
- Family: †Procolophonidae
- Genus: †Sphenosaurus von Meyer, 1847
- Species: †S. sternbergii

Binomial name
- †Sphenosaurus sternbergii von Meyer, 1847

Synonyms
- Palaeosaurus sternbergii Fitzinger, 1840

Extinct genus of reptiles

Sphenosaurus is a poorly known genus of procolophonid, a type of prehistoric reptile from the Late Permian Buntsanstein of Germany. Originally assigned the name Palaeosaurus sternbergii, by German paleontologist Leopold Joseph Fitzinger in 1840, the generic name was already preoccupied by not one but two other reptiles assigned the name Palaeosaurus. In 1847, Hermann von Meyer recognized the original 1833 and 1836 usages of Palaeosaurus and moved P. sternbergii to a new genus, Sphenosaurus.
