= 1827 in paleontology =

Paleontology or palaeontology is the study of prehistoric life forms on Earth through the examination of plant and animal fossils. This includes the study of body fossils, tracks (ichnites), burrows, cast-off parts, fossilised feces (coprolites), palynomorphs and chemical residues. Because humans have encountered fossils for millennia, paleontology has a long history both before and after becoming formalized as a science. This article records significant discoveries and events related to paleontology that occurred or were published in the year 1827.

== Reptiles ==
- Gideon Mantell discovered some fossil bones in the Wealden beds (Wessex Formation) of Sussex, England that he believed were the remains of ancient birds.
- Mantell recognized that his "bird" bones were actually pterosaur fossils and reported his findings to the scientific literature. These were the first Cretaceous pterosaur fossils ever described.

=== Dinosaurs ===
==== New taxa ====
Taxon	Novelty	Status	Author(s)	Age	Unit	Location	Notes	Images
Megalosaurus bucklandii	Sp. nov.	Valid	Mantell	Bathonian	Taynton Limestone Formation	England	A species for Megalosaurus Buckland, 1824	
