= 1832 in paleontology =

Paleontology or palaeontology is the study of prehistoric life forms on Earth through the examination of plant and animal fossils. This includes the study of body fossils, tracks (ichnites), burrows, cast-off parts, fossilised feces (coprolites), palynomorphs and chemical residues. Because humans have encountered fossils for millennia, paleontology has a long history both before and after becoming formalized as a science. This article records significant discoveries and events related to paleontology that occurred or were published in the year 1832.

== Crocodylomorphs ==
=== New taxa ===
Taxon	Novelty	Status	Author(s)	Age	Unit	Location	Notes	Images
Metriorhynchus	Gen. nov.	Valid	von Meyer	Kimmeridgian	La Voulte-sur-Rhône	France	Many species have been referred to Metriorhynchus since 1830, yet recent studies show that only three species are valid and referrable to the genus, the type M. geoffroyii, M. superciliosus, and M. hastifer.	

== Dinosaurs ==
=== New taxa ===
Taxon	Novelty	Status	Author(s)	Age	Unit	Location	Notes	Images
Iguanodon mantelli	Sp. nov.	Jr. synonym	von Meyer	Barremian	Tilgate Forest	England	A species for Iguanodon, which had already been given by Holl in 1829 as I. anglicus.	
Streptospondylus	Gen. nov.	Valid	von Meyer	Oxfordian, 161 mya	Vaches Noires	France	The remains of Streptospondylus were the first dinosaurian remains to be described (by Cuvier in 1808), however, their identification was thought to be teleosaurid or metriorhynchid.	

== Pterosaurs ==
=== New taxa ===
Taxon	Novelty	Status	Author(s)	Age	Unit	Location	Notes	Images
Pterodactylus bucklandi	Sp. nov.	Nomen dubium	von Meyer	Bathonian	Stonesfield Slate	England	While von Meyer reported the locality as Stonesfield, these fossils are likely misrepresented and originally came from Solnhofen limestone.	
"Ornithocephalus giganteus"		Nomen nudum	von Meyer	Kimmeridgian	Solnhofen limestone	Germany	Meyer attributes the name to Sommerring, 1820, while Wellnhofer attributes the name to Oken, 1819. Neither Sommerring nor Oken used the name.	

== Paleontologists ==
- Death of Georges Cuvier
