= 1836 in paleontology =

Paleontology or palaeontology is the study of prehistoric life forms on Earth through the examination of plant and animal fossils. This includes the study of body fossils, tracks (ichnites), burrows, cast-off parts, fossilised feces (coprolites), palynomorphs and chemical residues. Because humans have encountered fossils for millennia, paleontology has a long history both before and after becoming formalized as a science. This article records significant discoveries and events related to paleontology that occurred or were published in the year 1836.

== Dinosaurs ==
=== Newly named dinosaurs ===
Taxon	Novelty	Status	Author(s)	Age	Unit	Location	Notes	Images
Poekilopleuron bucklandii	Gen. et sp. nov.	Valid	Jacques Amand Eudes-Deslongchamps	Middle Jurassic (Bathonian)	Calcaire de Caen	France	As shown in Ref., the genus and species were first named and described by Jacques-Amand Eudes-Deslongchamps in a report published in 1836, based on holotype material that is now destroyed. In 1837, Eudes-Deslongchamps published a more detailed account of this discovery in a monograph which was also inserted next year in volume 6 of the "Mémoires de la Société Linnéenne Normandie".	
Palaeosaurus cylindrodon	Gen. et sp. nov.	Preoccupied genus, nomen dubium	Henry Riley, Samuel Stutchbury	Late Triassic, Rhaetian	Durdham Down	England	The name was preoccupied by a non-dinosaurian archosaur named by Geoffroy Saint-Hilaire in 1833. Palaeosaurus cylindrodon is the type species of the genus.	
Palaeosaurus platyodon	Sp. nov.	Preoccupied genus, nomen dubium	Henry Riley, Samuel Stutchbury	Late Triassic, Rhaetian	Durdham Down	England	Second species of the preoccupied genus Palaeosaurus, later renamed into the separate genus Rileya.	
Thecodontosaurus	Gen. nov.	Valid	Henry Riley, Samuel Stutchbury	Late Triassic, Rhaetian	Durdham Down	England	Thecodontosaurus is the fourth valid dinosaur genus named. It was first excavated by Riley and Stutchbury in 1834, and they published a preliminary description in 1835. When they assigned the remains to a new taxon, which they named Thecodontosaurus, they did not assign a species. The genus was not originally recognized as a dinosaur, with Riley and Stutchbury finding it a saurian.	

== Pterosaurs ==
- William Buckland depicted pterosaurs as cliff-climbing winged reptiles in a manner heavily influenced by Goldfuss.
