= 1840 in paleontology =

Paleontology or palaeontology is the study of prehistoric life forms on Earth through the examination of plant and animal fossils. This includes the study of body fossils, tracks (ichnites), burrows, cast-off parts, fossilised feces (coprolites), palynomorphs and chemical residues. Because humans have encountered fossils for millennia, paleontology has a long history both before and after becoming formalized as a science. This article records significant discoveries and events related to paleontology that occurred or were published in the year 1840.

== Arthropods ==
=== Crustaceans ===
Name	Novelty	Status	Authors	Age	Unit	Location	Notes	Images
Alvis	Gen. et. sp. nov.	Jr synonym	Münster	Jurassic	Solnhofen Limestone	Germany	Type species is A. octopus, initially described as an isopod, now a junior synonym of Pseudastacus.	
Norna	Gen. et. sp. nov.	Valid	Münster	Jurassic	Solnhofen Limestone	Germany	A peracarid initially described as an isopod, type species is N. lithophila.	
Sculda	Gen. et. sp. nov.	Valid	Münster	Late Jurassic (Tithonian)	Solnhofen Limestone	Germany	A mantis shrimp initially described as an isopod, type species is S. pennata.	
Urda	Gen. et. sp. nov.	Valid	Münster	Jurassic - Cretaceous		Germany	An isopod, species named include U. rostrata, U. decorata, U. cincta & U. elongata.	no pictures available...

== Anapsids ==
=== Newly named anapsids ===
Name	Status	Authors	Age	Unit	Location	Notes
Palaeosaurus	Preoccupied	Fitzinger	Early Permian	Unnamed unit (coal deposits)	Czech Republic	Preoccupied by a non-dinosaurian archosaur named by Geoffroy Saint-Hilare in 1833. Renamed Sphenosaurus. A procolophonid.

== Archosauromorphs ==
=== Newly named basal archosauromorphs ===
Name	Status	Authors		Age	Unit	Location	Notes
Paleosaurus	Nomen dubium	Riley	Stutchbury	Late Triassic (?Rhaetian)	Magnesian Conglomerate	England	An archosaur of unknown affinities

=== Newly named dinosaurs ===
Data courtesy of George Olshevsky's dinosaur genera list.

Name	Status	Authors	Notes	Images
Hylosaurus	Jr. synonym	Fitzinger	Junior synonym of Hylaeosaurus.	
Therosaurus	Valid	Fitzinger	An iguanodont. New name for "Iguanodon" mantelli von Meyer (1832) (=Iguanodon anglicus Holl (1829)).	

=== Pterosaurs ===
- Thomas Hawkins published The Book of the Great Sea-Dragons, wherein he suggested that the great reptiles of the Mesozoic were created by the devil. He described pterosaurs as "an engrafted-by-Evil stock" and depicted them as bat-like scavengers that combed the ancient seashore.

== Plesiosaurs ==
=== Newly named plesiosaurs ===
Name	Status	Authors	Age	Unit	Location	Notes	Images
Plesiosaurus arcuatus	Valid	Owen	Early Jurassic (Hettangian-Sinemurian)	Blue Lias	United Kingdom	A rhomaleosaurid.	
Plesiosaurus brachyspondylus	Valid	Owen	Late Jurassic (Kimmeridgian)	Kimmeridge Clay Formation	United Kingdom	A thalassophonean pliosaurid.	
Plesiosaurus hawkinsii	Valid	Owen	Early Jurassic (Hettangian-Sinemurian)	Blue Lias	United Kingdom	A pliosaurid.	
Plesiosaurus rugosus	Valid	Owen	Early Jurassic (Hettangian-Sinemurian)	Blue Lias	United Kingdom	A microcleidid.	
Plesiosaurus trochantericus	Valid	Owen	Late Jurassic (Kimmeridgian)	Kimmeridge Clay Formation	United Kingdom	A cryptoclidid.	

== Mammals ==
=== Newly named cetaceans ===
Name	Novelty	Status	Authors	Age	Unit	Location	Notes	Images
Squalodon	Gen. nov.	Valid	Grateloup	Early Miocene (Burdigalian)	Unnamed unit	France	A squalodontid.	
