= 1829 in paleontology =

Paleontology or palaeontology is the study of prehistoric life forms on Earth through the examination of plant and animal fossils. This includes the study of body fossils, tracks (ichnites), burrows, cast-off parts, fossilised feces (coprolites), palynomorphs and chemical residues. Because humans have encountered fossils for millennia, paleontology has a long history both before and after becoming formalized as a science. This article records significant discoveries and events related to paleontology that occurred or were published in the year 1829.

== Dinosaurs ==
=== New taxa ===
| Taxon | Novelty | Status | Author(s) | Age | Unit | Location | Notes | Images |
|---|---|---|---|---|---|---|---|---|
| Iguanodon anglicus | Sp. nov. | Nomen dubium | Holl | Barremian | Tilgate Forest | England | A species for Iguanodon Mantell, 1825 | |

== Pterosaurs ==
- William Buckland described the new species Pterodactylus macronyx based on fossil remains discovered by Mary Anning in December the previous year from the Lias Group of the Dorset Coast of England. These were the first scientifically documented pterosaurs to be discovered outside of the Solnhofen lithographic limestone.

=== New taxa ===
| Taxon | Novelty | Status | Author(s) | Age | Unit | Location | Notes | Images |
|---|---|---|---|---|---|---|---|---|
| Pterodactylus macronyx | Sp. nov. | Valid | Buckland | Sinemurian | Blue Lias | England | Later named Dimorphodon macronyx | |
