= 1835 in paleontology =

Paleontology or palaeontology is the study of prehistoric life forms on Earth through the examination of plant and animal fossils. This includes the study of body fossils, tracks (ichnites), burrows, cast-off parts, fossilised feces (coprolites), palynomorphs and chemical residues. Because humans have encountered fossils for millennia, paleontology has a long history both before and after becoming formalized as a science. This article records significant discoveries and events related to paleontology that occurred or were published in the year 1835.

== Adam Sedgwick and Roderick Murchison ==
In 1835, Adam Sedgwick began naming the Cambrian System, "recognizing the first rich assemblage of fossils in the rock record". Roderick Murchison names the Silurian system in the same year. He believes that (not accurately) that the Silurian era predates any fossils of land plants and consequently any "economically valuable coal seams". In later years, Murchison and Sedgwick would have many a heated debate over the priority of these systems.

== See also ==
- 1835
