= 1833 in paleontology =

Paleontology or palaeontology is the study of prehistoric life forms on Earth through the examination of plant and animal fossils. This includes the study of body fossils, tracks (ichnites), burrows, cast-off parts, fossilised feces (coprolites), palynomorphs and chemical residues. Because humans have encountered fossils for millennia, paleontology has a long history both before and after becoming formalized as a science. This article records significant discoveries and events related to paleontology that occurred or were published in the year 1833.

== Dinosaurs ==
=== New taxa ===
| Taxon | Novelty | Status | Author(s) | Age | Unit | Location | Notes | Images |
|---|---|---|---|---|---|---|---|---|
| Hylaeosaurus armatus | Gen. et sp. nov. | Valid | Mantell | Early Cretaceous | Tilgate Forest, Grinstead Clay Formation, Westfalen | England | Hylaeosaurus was named in 1833 by Mantell for most of a skeleton including an isolated tail. This material was then later described in more detail by Mantell and Alexander Gordon Melville in an 1849 publication. | |

== Pterosaurs ==
=== New taxa ===
| Name | Novelty | Status | Author(s) | Age | Unit | Location | Notes | Images |
|---|---|---|---|---|---|---|---|---|
| Gnathosaurus subulatus | Gen. et sp. nov. | Valid | von Meyer | Tithonian | Solnhofen Limestone | Germany | A gnathosaurine ctenochasmatid. This is one of two species assigned to Gnathosaurus, the other being G. macrurus. Aurorazhdarcho is a potential junior synonym of Gnathosaurus subulatus. Gnathosaurus as well as related genera such as Germanodactylus, Ctenochasma, and Pterodactylus all possessed large soft tissue crests. All four genera are from the Solnhofen Limestone, and share a common ancestor which, presumably, also had a crest. | |

== Fish ==
=== New taxa ===
| Taxon | Novelty | Status | Author(s) | Age | Unit | Location | Notes | Images |
|---|---|---|---|---|---|---|---|---|
| Lepidosaurus | Gen. nov. | Jr. synonym | von Meyer | Toarcian, 150 mya | Whitby, Holzmaden, Dobbertin, La Caine | England, France, Germany | This genus is now considered a junior synonym of Lepidotes. Although previously known from species ranging between 205 and 100 mya, a 2012 study found only species from the Late Jurassic to be in the genus, and reassigned the rest. | |
