= James Alan Moy-Thomas =

English palaeontological ichthyologist

- Born: 12 September 1908; London
- Died: 29 February 1944 (aged 35)
- Occupation: Palaeontologist
- Spouse: Joy Mitchell

James Alan Moy-Thomas (12 September 1908 – 29 February 1944) was an English palaeontological ichthyologist.

The son of Alan Moy-Thomas and his wife Gertrude, he was born in London. He had a younger brother Edward and an older sister Joan Caroline. He was educated at Eton and at Christ Church, Oxford, where he graduated with a first class degree in zoology in 1930

He authored numerous papers on palaeontological ichthyology.

In 1933 he married Joy Mitchell in Wharfedale, Yorkshire.

In 1941 he was granted a Commission in the Special Duties Branch (i.e. intelligence) of the RAF. His service number was 66643.

He died in a motor vehicle accident in 1944 and was buried in Cambridge. An obituary was published in The Times, and another by Edwin Stephen Goodrich was published in Nature.

Two genera of Palaeozoic fish, Jamoytius and Moythomasia, are named after him.

His brother Edward died later that year on active service in the Netherlands, during Operation Market Garden.
