= 1834 in paleontology =

Paleontology or palaeontology is the study of prehistoric life forms on Earth through the examination of plant and animal fossils. This includes the study of body fossils, tracks (ichnites), burrows, cast-off parts, fossilised feces (coprolites), palynomorphs and chemical residues. Because humans have encountered fossils for millennia, paleontology has a long history both before and after becoming formalized as a science. This article records significant discoveries and events related to paleontology that occurred or were published in the year 1834.

== Pterosaurs ==
- Johann Jacob Kaup first referred to pterosaurs by the name Pterosauri.

== Lophotrochozoans ==
=== Newly named lophotrochozoans ===
Name	Status	Authors	Notes
Macrodontophion	Nomen dubium	Zborzewski	

== Sauropterygians ==
=== Newly named nothosaurs ===
Name	Novelty	Status	Authors	Age	Unit	Location	Notes	Images
Nothosaurus mirabilis	Gen. et sp. nov.	Valid taxon	Georg zu Münster	Middle to early Late Triassic	Muschelkalk	Germany	A Seal-like marine reptile, from the family Nothosauridae. The type species of the genus Nothosaurus.	
Nothosaurus giganteus	Sp. nov.	Valid taxon	Georg zu Münster	Middle to early Late Triassic	Osnabrück	Germany	An additional species of Nothosaurus.	
Conchiosaurus clavatus	Gen. et sp. nov.	Junior synonym	Christian Erich Hermann von Meyer	Middle Triassic	Muschelkalk	Germany	A junior synonym of Nothosaurus.	
