= 1843 in paleontology =

Paleontology or palaeontology is the study of prehistoric life forms on Earth through the examination of plant and animal fossils. This includes the study of body fossils, tracks (ichnites), burrows, cast-off parts, fossilised feces (coprolites), palynomorphs and chemical residues. Because humans have encountered fossils for millennia, paleontology has a long history both before and after becoming formalized as a science. This article records significant discoveries and events related to paleontology that occurred or were published in the year 1843.

== Pterosaurs ==
- Edward Newman interpreted pterosaurs as mammals in a similar fashion to Soemmering. However, Newman specifically considered pterosaurs to be carnivorous flying marsupials.

== Sharks ==
- Louis Agassiz named a new taxon, Otodus and renamed Lamna obliqua as new Otodus species, the O. obliquus.
- Louis Agassiz named and renamed species, such as the Oxyrhina xiphodon, Oxyrhina hastalis, a new species of White Shark, the Carcharodon subauriculatus (now, replaced in Otodus genus and known as O. chubutensis) was named also.

=== New taxa ===
Name	Status	Authors	Notes
Pachyrhamphus	Preoccupied	Fitzinger	Preoccupied name; now known as Scaphognathus.

== See also ==
- 1843
