= 1842 in paleontology =

Paleontology or palaeontology is the study of prehistoric life forms on Earth through the examination of plant and animal fossils. This includes the study of body fossils, tracks (ichnites), burrows, cast-off parts, fossilised feces (coprolites), palynomorphs and chemical residues. Because humans have encountered fossils for millennia, paleontology has a long history both before and after becoming formalized as a science. This article records significant discoveries and events related to paleontology that occurred or were published in the year 1842.

== Dinosaurs ==
=== Newly named dinosaurs ===
| Name | Status | Authors | Notes |
|---|---|---|---|
| Belodon | Misidentification. | von Meyer | Misidentified phytosaur. |
| Brachytaenius | Misidentification. | von Meyer | Dubious non-dinosaurian reptile. |

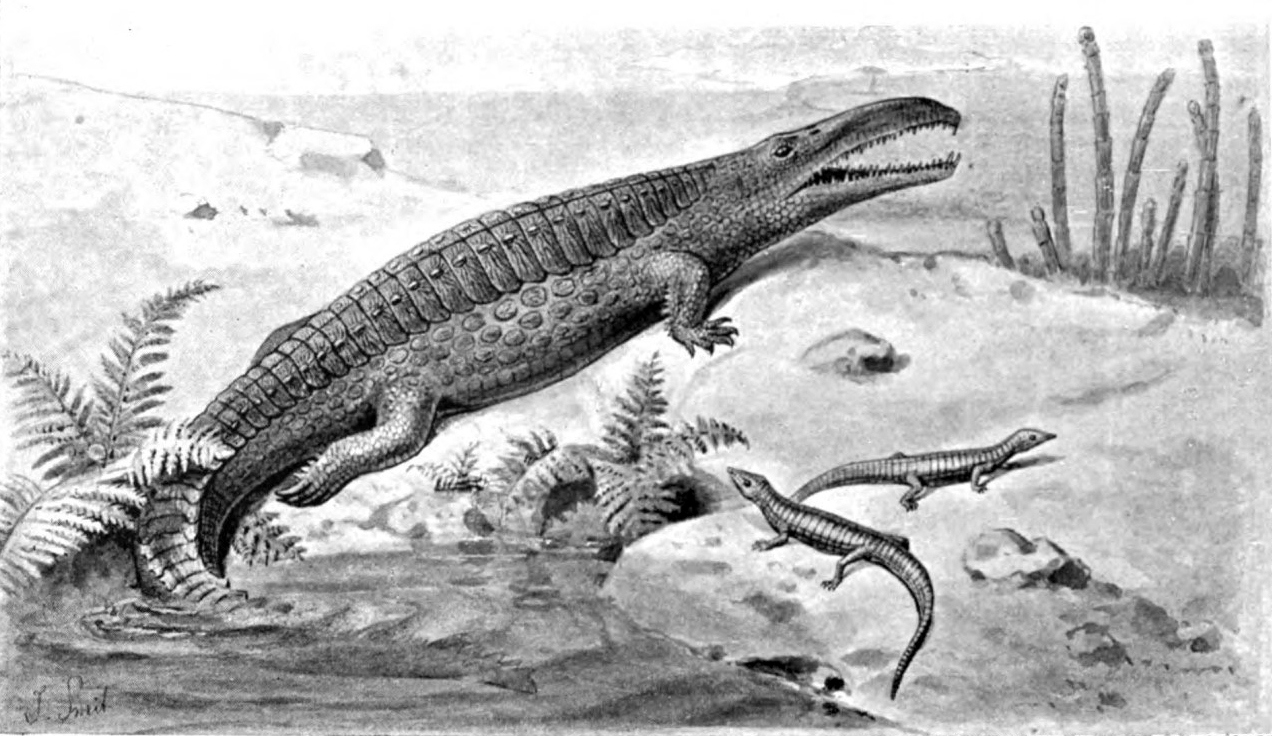
Belodon was actually a phytosaur.

== Pterosaurs ==
- Sir Richard Owen formally named the orders Pterosauria and the Dinosauria.
