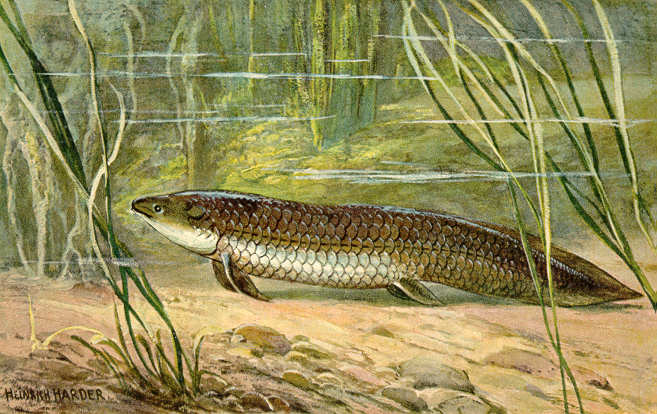
- Ceratodus

Scientific classification
- Kingdom: Animalia
- Phylum: Chordata
- Class: Dipnoi
- Order: Ceratodontiformes
- Family: †Ceratodontidae; Gill, 1872

Genera
- See text

= Ceratodontidae =

Ceratodontidae Temporal range: Early Triassic to Eocene, 251.3 - 57.0 mya (but see text)

Extinct family of fishes

Ceratodontidae is an extinct family of lungfish with fossils known worldwide from the earliest Triassic to the Eocene.

== Taxonomy ==
Although the extant Queensland lungfish was formerly also classified in this family due to its similar appearance, phylogenetic and morphological evidence indicates that it belongs in a different family, Neoceratodontidae. A morphological study by Kemp et al (2017) proposed that Ceratodontidae was more closely related to modern African (Protopteridae) and South American lungfish (Leptosirenidae) than Queensland lungfish. However, Brownstein, Harrington & Near (2023) found Ceratodontidae to lie outside the crown group of modern lungfish, with all modern lungfish more closely related to each other than to Ceratodontidae.

== Genera ==
The following genera are known from the family:

- †Arganodus (alternatively placed in own family, Arganodontidae)
- †Ariguna
- †Asperideceratodus Aliança Formation, Brazil, Tithonian
- †Ceratodus
- †Epiceratodus
- †Lupaceratodus Galula Formation, Tanzania, Cretaceous
- †Metaceratodus
- †Microceratodus(?)
- †Potamoceratodus
- †Tekoaceratodus Aliança Formation, Brazil, Tithonian
- †Tellerodus
- †Retodus

Paraceratodus was also classified in this family but phylogenetic evidence supports it being the most basal member of Ceratodontoidei.
