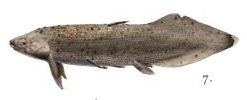
- Restoration of Retodus sp.

Scientific classification
- Domain: Eukaryota
- Kingdom: Animalia
- Phylum: Chordata
- Clade: Sarcopterygii
- Class: Dipnoi
- Order: Ceratodontiformes
- Family: †Ceratodontidae
- Genus: †Retodus; Churcher, De Iuliis & Kleindienst, 2006

Type species
- †Retodus tuberculatus Churcher, De Iuliis & Kleindienst, 2006

Synonyms
- †Ceratodus tuberculatus Tabaste, 1963; †Neoceratodus tuberculatus Tabaste, 1963

= Retodus =

Retodus Temporal range: Albian–Maastrichtian

Extinct genus of fishes

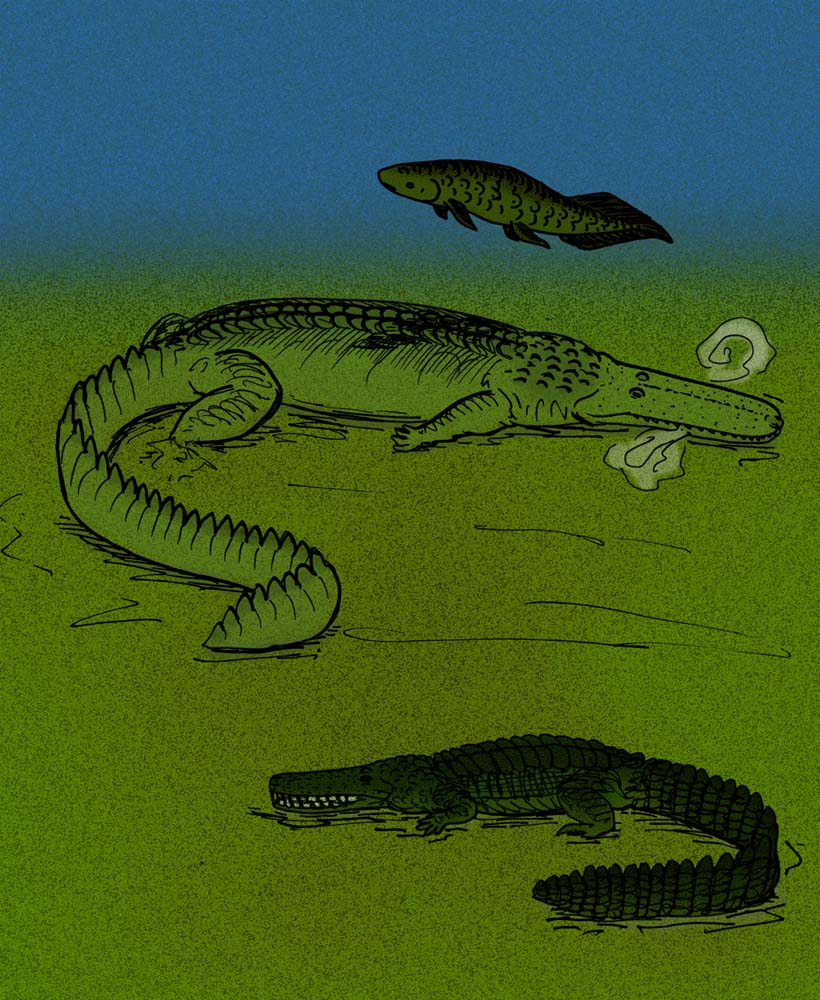
Comparison of Retodus (top) with the contemporaneous Stomatosuchus (center) Laganosuchus (bottom)

Retodus is an extinct genus of prehistoric lungfish found in Cretaceous-aged freshwater strata of Egypt (Baharija Formation), Algeria and Niger. The type species, R. tuberculatus, was named in 2006. It was originally named as a species of Ceratodus and Neoceratodus in 1963.

== Description ==
Tooth plates of R. tuberculatus are characterised by four transverse ridges, broadly rounded crests, a reticular pattern of ridges and hollows, and large adult size.

== See also ==
- Sarcopterygii
- List of sarcopterygians
- List of prehistoric bony fish
