= Ferganoceratodus =

Ferganoceratodus Temporal range: Early Triassic–Coniacian

Scientific classification
- Kingdom: Animalia
- Phylum: Chordata
- Class: Dipnoi
- Order: Ceratodontiformes
- Genus: †Ferganoceratodus; Nessov & Kaznyshkin, 1985

Type species
- †Ferganoceratodus jurassicus Kaznyshkin and Nessov, 1985

Species
- See text

Extinct genus of fishes

Ferganoceratodus (from Fergana + Ceratodus) is a genus of prehistoric freshwater lungfish known from worldwide during the Mesozoic. Based on morphological evidence, it has either been recovered as a basal member of the Ceratodontiformes or to be the sister group of the Neoceratodontidae (containing the extant Australian lungfish).

Challands et al (2023) defined synapomorphies of the genus as being a pterygoid tooth plate with five to six ridges, a prearticular tooth plate with four to five ridges, three bones on the medial skull roof series, and two bones on the calvarium. Under this definition, the genus is significantly expanded. However, most of these placements are only tentative.

== Species ==
The following species are currently classified in the genus. Many were formerly classified in Ptychoceratodus, Ceratodus, or other genera, but were reassigned to this genus in 2023:

- †F. acutus (Priem, 1924) - Late Triassic of Madagascar (=Ptychoceratodus acutus)
- †F. annekempae Cavin, Deesri & Chanthasit, 2020 - Phu Kradung Formation, Thailand, Late Jurassic (named after Anne Kemp)
- †F. cabreirai Quezado et al., 2026 - Late Triassic (Carnian) of Brazil (Santa Maria Formation)
- †F. concinnus (Meyer & Plieninger, 1844) - Late Triassic (Carnian to Norian) of Germany (Weser Formation)
- †F. cuyanus (Agnolin et al., 2017) - Late Triassic of Argentina (=Ptychoceratodus cuyanus)
- †F. edwardsi Challands et al., 2023 - Late Triassic (Norian) of Zimbabwe (Pebbly Arkose Formation)
- †F. hislopianus (Oldham, 1859) - Late Triassic of India (Maleri Formation)
- †F. iheringi (Ameghino, 1906) - Late (Cenomanian) Cretaceous of Argentina (Amarilla Formation)
- †F. jurassicus Nessov & Kaznyshkin, 1985 (type species) - Middle Jurassic of Kyrgyzstan (Balabansai Formation)
- †F. madagascarensis (Martin, 1982) - Late Cretaceous (Coniacian) of Madagascar (Ankazomihaboka Formation)
- †F. martini Cavin et al., 2007 - Phu Kradung Formation, Thailand, Late Jurassic-?earliest Cretaceous
- ?†F. patagonicus (Agnolin, 2010) - Campanian/Maastrichtian of Argentina (=Atlantoceratodus patagonicus)
- †F. phillipsi (Agassiz, 1838) - Middle Jurassic of England (Taynton Limestone), Late Triassic (Carnian) of Germany, potentially Carnian of Brazil, Early Triassic of South Africa, early Triassic of Australia
- †F. rectangulus (Linck, 1936) - Late Triassic (Norian) of Greenland (Fleming Fjord Formation) and Germany (Löwenstein Formation) (=Ptychoceratodus rectangulus (Linck, 1936))
- †F. roemeri (Skrzycki, 2015) - Late Triassic (Carnian) of Poland (Grabowa Formation)
- †F. szechuanensis (Young, 1942) - Thailand (Huai Hin Lat Formation) Late Triassic (Norian) South China, Jurassic, Khlong Min Formation, Thailand, Middle Jurassic, Phu Kradung Formation, Thailand, Late Jurassic-?earliest Cretaceous

Potential remains have also been reported from the late Early Cretaceous (Albian) of Tunisia, the Triassic of Germany, and the Late Cretaceous of Madagascar.

Unusually, North America is the only continent to lack any records of Ferganoceratodus, despite the extremely wide geographic and stratigraphic range of the genus. It has been suggested that some of the potential "Ceratodus" species from North America may be members of Ferganoceratodus, or that Ferganoceratodus was excluded from North America by the similar but highly distinct Potamoceratodus lineage.
