= Metaceratodus =

Metaceratodus Temporal range: Late Triassic-Late Cretaceous, 221.5–66 Ma Norian-Maastrichtian

Scientific classification
- Kingdom: Animalia
- Phylum: Chordata
- Class: Dipnoi
- Order: Ceratodontiformes
- Family: †Ceratodontidae
- Genus: †Metaceratodus; Chapman, 1914

Species
- See text

Extinct genus of fishes

Metaceratodus is an extinct genus of prehistoric lungfish in the family Ceratodontidae, with an indeterminate specimen known from the Late Triassic (Norian)-aged Lissauer Breccia of Poland and more complete specimens known from the Late Cretaceous of Queensland, Australia and Argentina (Malargue Group). The genus was named and described by Frederick Chapman in 1914.

== Species ==
The seven identified species of Metaceratodus are listed below, while an eighth unnamed species is known from Poland:

- cf. Metaceratodus sp.
- Metaceratodus baibianorum
- Metaceratodus bonei
- Metaceratodus ellioti
- Metaceratodus kaopen (=Ptychoceratodus kaopen, P. cionei)
- Metaceratodus palmeri
- Metaceratodus wichmanni (=Ceratodus wichmanni)
- Metaceratodus wollastoni

== Palaeobiology ==
=== Palaeopathology ===
Of 127 analysed specimens of M. baibianorum from the La Colonia Formation of Patagonia, 27.5% showed signs of some form of dental pathology such as caries, abscess, hyperplasia, fracture, erosion, and alteration in growth, though none showed signs of attrition, osteopenia, parasitic invasions. Some specimens exhibiting caries on the occlusal surface also show signs of reparative dentine growth, indicating that dipnoans could produce tertiary dentine in response to injuries to the tooth.

== See also ==
- Sarcopterygii
- List of sarcopterygians
- List of prehistoric bony fish
