= Microceratodus =

Scientific classification
- Domain: Eukaryota
- Kingdom: Animalia
- Phylum: Chordata
- Clade: Sarcopterygii
- Class: Dipnoi
- Order: Ceratodontiformes
- Family: †Ceratodontidae
- Genus: †Microceratodus; Teixeira, 1954

Type species
- †Ceratodus angolensis Teixeira, 1949

Extinct genus of fishes

Microceratodus is an extinct genus of prehistoric sarcopterygians or lobe-finned fish.

== See also ==
- Sarcopterygii
- List of sarcopterygians
- List of prehistoric bony fish
