= Mioceratodus =

Mioceratodus Temporal range: Oligocene - Miocene (but see text)

Scientific classification
- Domain: Eukaryota
- Kingdom: Animalia
- Phylum: Chordata
- Clade: Sarcopterygii
- Class: Dipnoi
- Order: Ceratodontiformes
- Family: Neoceratodontidae
- Genus: †Mioceratodus; Kemp, 1992

Species
- See text

Extinct genus of fishes

Mioceratodus is an extinct genus of lungfish in the family Neoceratodontidae, which also contains the extant Queensland lungfish. It is known only from Oligocene and Miocene-aged sediments in Australia, although phylogenetic evidence supports it having first diverged from its closest relative, Neoceratodus, during the Late Jurassic or Early Cretaceous period.

4 species are known from this genus:

- †Mioceratodus anemosyrus
- †Mioceratodus diaphorus
- †Mioceratodus gregoryi
- †Mioceratodus poastrus

== See also ==
- Sarcopterygii
- List of sarcopterygians
- List of prehistoric bony fish
