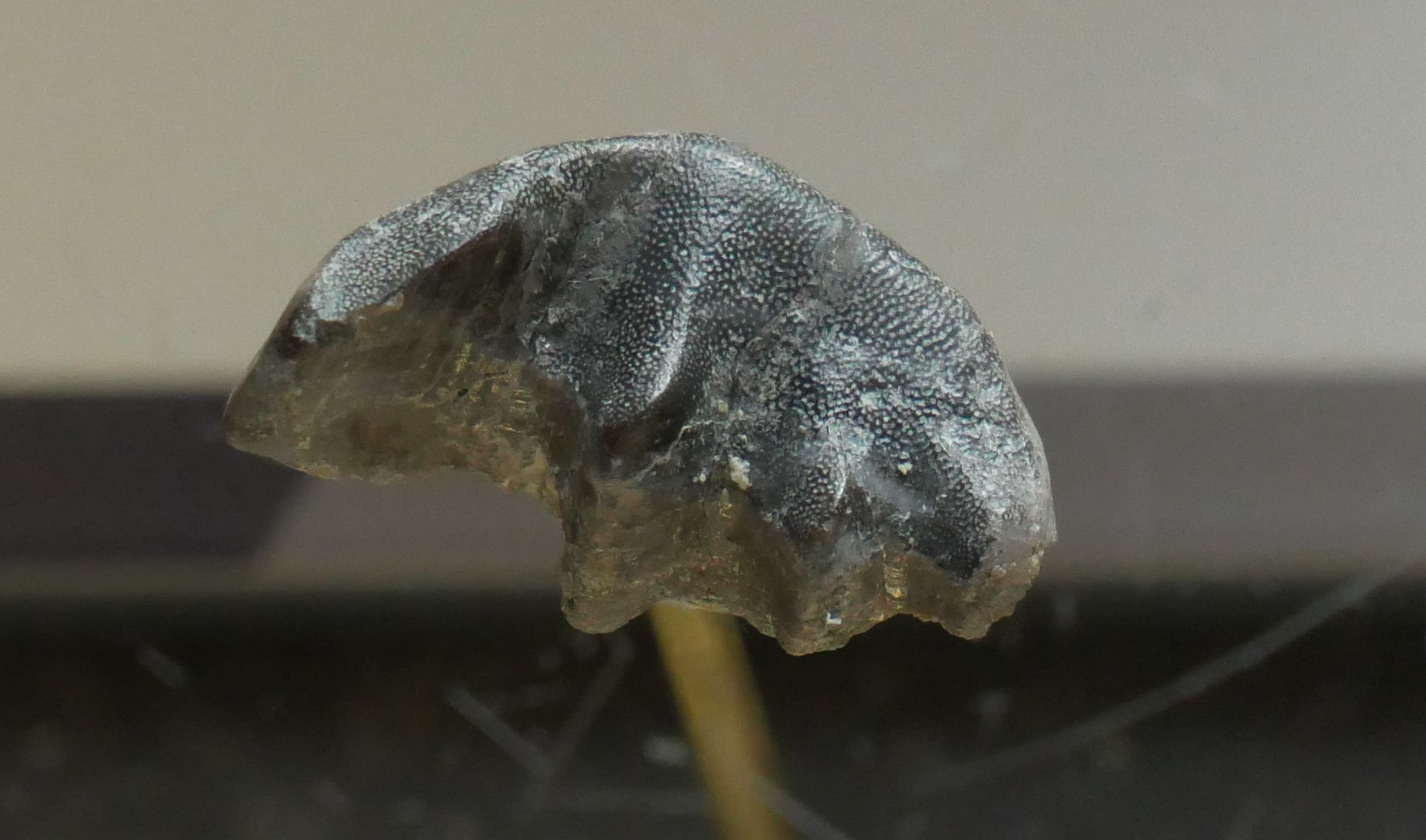
- Tooth plate at the Cincinnati Museum Center

Scientific classification
- Kingdom: Animalia
- Phylum: Chordata
- Class: Dipnoi
- Order: Ceratodontiformes
- Family: †Ceratodontidae
- Genus: †Potamoceratodus; Pardo et al., 2010

Type species
- †P. guentheri (Marsh, 1878)

Synonyms
- Ceratodus guentheri Marsh, 1878; Ptychoceratodus guentheri (Marsh, 1878); Ceratodus felchi Kirkland, 1987

= Potamoceratodus =

Potamoceratodus Temporal range: 157–145 Ma

Extinct genus of fishes

Potamoceratodus is an extinct genus of lungfish belonging to the family Ceratodontidae known from the Late Jurassic Morrison Formation of Colorado, USA. It was first named by Jason D. Pardo, Adam K. Huttenlocker, Bryan J. Small and Mark A. Gorman II in 2010 and the type species is Potamoceratodus guentheri.
