= Uranolophidae =

Uranolophidae Temporal range: Late Devonian

Scientific classification
- Kingdom: Animalia
- Phylum: Chordata
- Class: Dipnoi
- Order: †Uranolophina
- Family: †Uranolophidae; Miles, 1977

Genera
- †Melanognathus; †Uranolophus

Extinct family of fishes

Uranolophidae is an extinct family of prehistoric lungfishes which lived during the Late Devonian period. Fossils have been found in North America.

== Phylogeny ==
- Sarcopterygii (Class)
  - Dipnoi (Subclass)
    - Uranolophina (Order)
      - Uranolophidae (Family)
        - Uranolophus (Genus)
        - Melanognathus (Genus)
