= Gosfordia =

Gosfordia Temporal range: Early-Mid Triassic
- Fossil of G. truncata

Scientific classification
- Kingdom: Animalia
- Phylum: Chordata
- Class: Dipnoi
- Order: Ceratodontiformes
- Genus: †Gosfordia; Woodward, 1890
- Species: †G. truncata

Binomial name
- †Gosfordia truncata Woodward, 1890

Extinct genus of fishes

Gosfordia is an extinct genus of prehistoric freshwater lungfish known from the Triassic of Australia. It contains a single species, G. truncata from the early-mid Triassic (late Olenekian or early Anisian)-aged Terrigal Formation and the Ansian Sydney Sandstone of New South Wales. It is thought to be an early-diverging member of the Ceratodontiformes, making it a distant relative of extant lungfish.

Initially based on five incomplete specimens of imperfect preservation, a complete specimen was described in 1981. Skull bones described in 1994 suggest a close relationship between Gosfordia and Paraceratodus. However, other studies suggest that it may have diverged prior to Paraceratodus.

== See also ==
- Sarcopterygii
- List of sarcopterygians
- List of prehistoric bony fish
