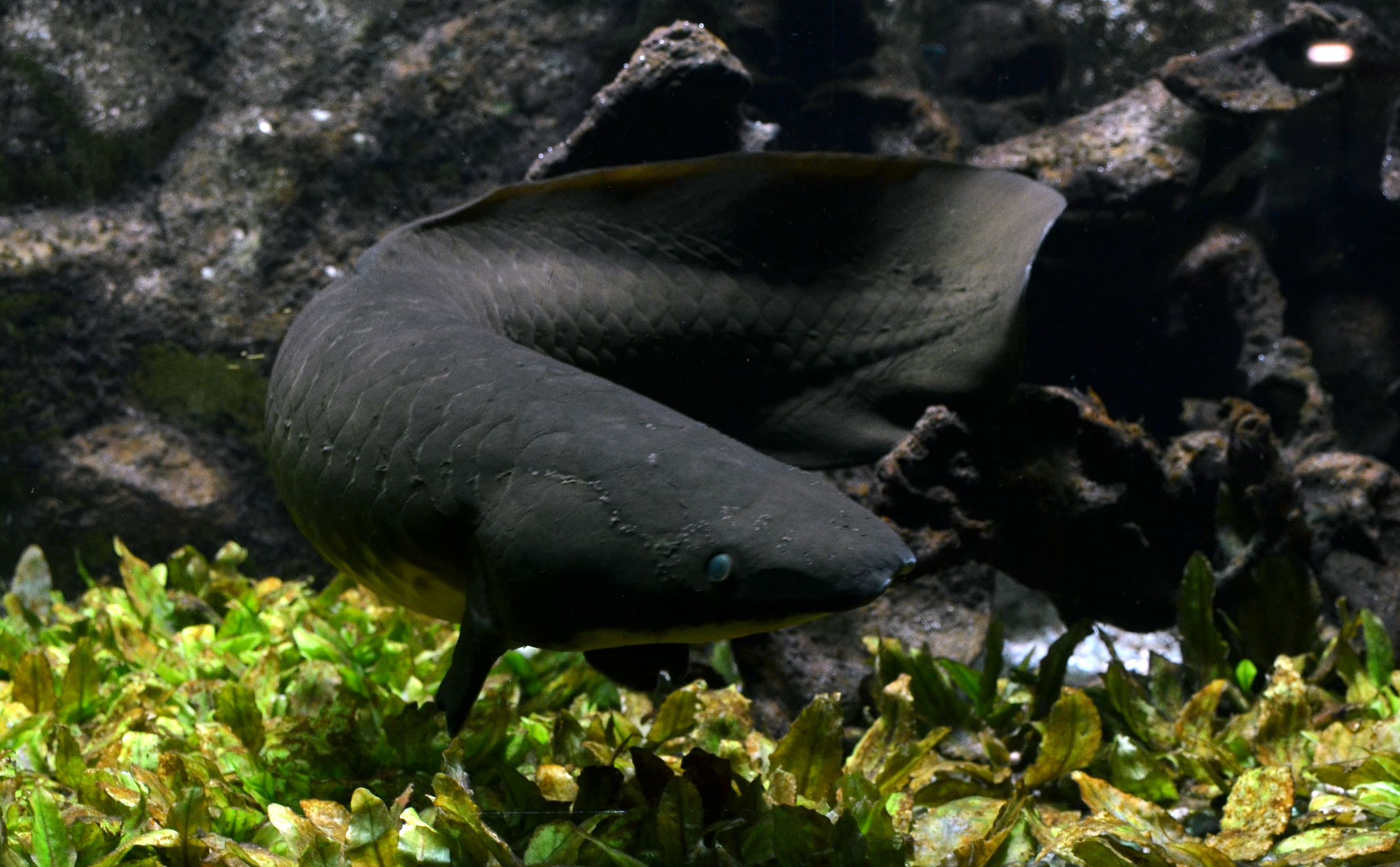
- Neoceratodus forsteri, the only surviving member of this genus.

Scientific classification
- Kingdom: Animalia
- Phylum: Chordata
- Class: Dipnoi
- Order: Ceratodontiformes
- Family: Neoceratodontidae
- Genus: Neoceratodus; Castelnau, 1876

Species
- See text.

= Neoceratodus =

Neoceratodus Temporal range: Albian–Present

Genus of lungfish

Neoceratodus is a genus of lungfish in the family Neoceratodontidae. The extant Australian lungfish (Neoceratodus forsteri) is the only surviving member of this genus, but it was formerly much more widespread, being distributed throughout Africa, Australia, and South America. Species were also much more diverse in body plan; for example, the Cretaceous species Neoceratodus africanus was a gigantic species that coexisted with Spinosaurus in what is now the Kem Kem Formation of Morocco. The earliest fossils from this genus are of Neoceratodus potkooroki from the mid Cretaceous (Albian-Cenomanian) Griman Creek Formation of Australia; remains from the Late Jurassic of Uruguay assigned to this genus probably do not belong to the genus.

== Species ==
The following species are currently classified in this genus:

- †Neoceratodus africanus
- †Neoceratodus eyrensis
- Neoceratodus forsteri (Queensland lungfish)
- †Neoceratodus potkooroki
- †Neoceratodus nargun
- †Neoceratodus palmeri

Two species formerly classified in Neoceratodus, N. gregoryi and N. djelleh, have since been reclassified to the genera Mioceratodus and Archaeoceratodus respectively, as Mioceratodus gregoryi and Archaeoceratodus djelleh.
