= Anne Kemp =

Australian ichthyologist and paleoichthyologist

Anne Kemp is an Australian ichthyologist and paleoichthyologist who specializes in lungfishes (order Dipnoi). Her primary area of study is the Australian lungfish (Neoceratodus forsteri). She has served as a research fellow at Griffith University since 2010. Prior to this, she had also served as a research fellow at Queensland Museum between 1980 and 1991, and at the Centre of Microscopy at the University of Queensland between 1999 and 2008.

Kemp's pioneering work was with Australian lungfish in the Brisbane River and at Enoggera Reservoir beginning in 1969; they are no longer thought to exist at the latter location. She has documented the decline of the species at many locations in Queensland at due to environmental degradation, finding significant lack of recruitment in the populations due to the construction of dams, and supports conservation efforts for the endangered species.

Aside from her work with the Australian lungfish, Kemp also studies the evolutionary history of lungfishes, including the creation of a new phylogeny of post-Devonian lungfish species as well as the description of many fossil lungfish species.

A species of fossil lungfish in the genus Ferganoceratodus described in 2020, Ferganoceratodus annekempae, was named after her.
