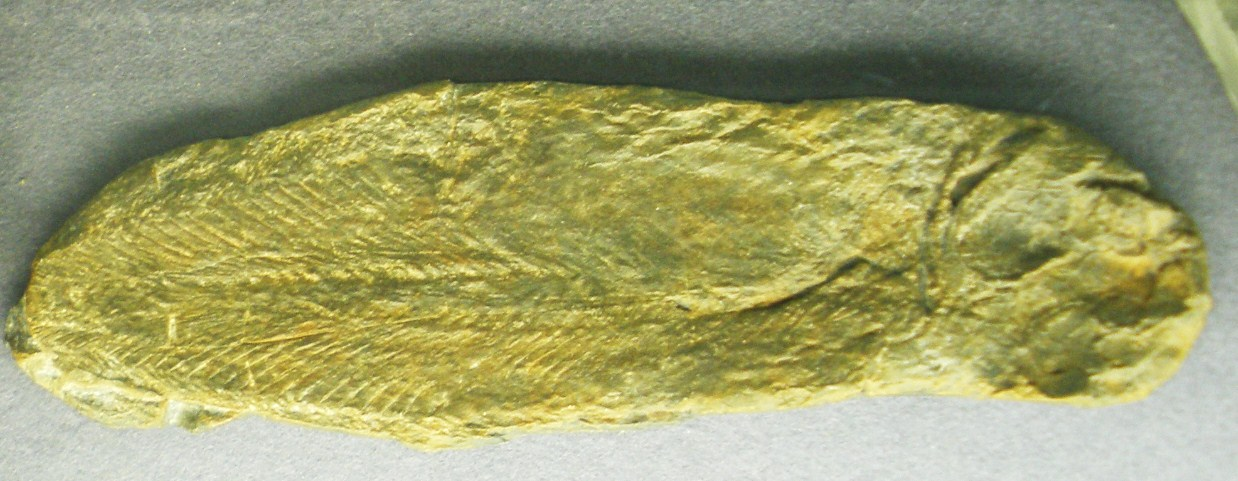
- Conchopoma gadiforme fossil

Scientific classification
- Kingdom: Animalia
- Phylum: Chordata
- Class: Dipnoi
- Genus: †Conchopoma; Kner, 1868

Type species
- †Conchopoma gadiforme Kner, 1868

Species
- C. arctatum Cope, 1877; C. edesi Denison, 1969; C. exanthematicum Cope, 1873; C. gadiforme Kner, 1868

= Conchopoma =

Conchopoma Temporal range: Carboniferous - Permian

Extinct genus of fishes

Conchopoma is an extinct genus of lungfish which lived during the Carboniferous and Permian period. Fossils have been found in the United States.
