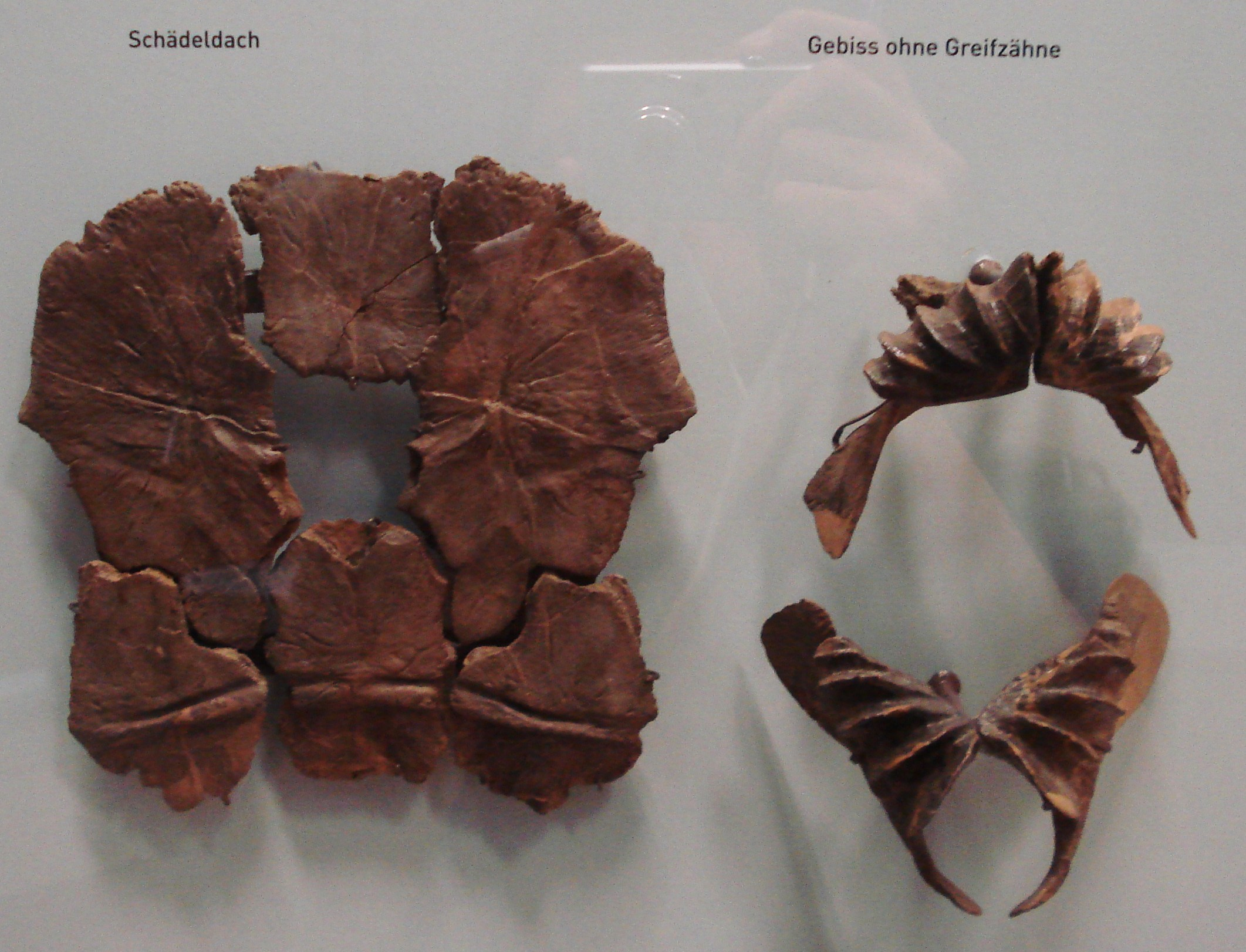
- Skull roof bones and jaws of Ptychoceratodus serratus

Scientific classification
- Kingdom: Animalia
- Phylum: Chordata
- Class: Dipnoi
- Family: †Ptychoceratodontidae; Martin, 1982
- Genus: †Ptychoceratodus; Jaekel, 1926

Type species
- †Ptychoceratodus phillipsi Agassiz, 1837

Species
- †P. acutus Priem, 1924 (vide Martin, 1982); †P. cionei Apestigua et al., 2007; †P. concinnus Meyer and Pleninger, 1844 (vide Martin, 1982); †P. cuyanus Agnolin et al., 2017; †P. donensis Vorobyeva and Minikh, 1968 (vide Martin, 1982); †P. gracilis Vorobyeva and Minikh, 1968; †P. oldhami Bhat & Ray, 2018; †P. ornatus Broom, 1908 (vide Martin, 1982); †P. phillipsi Agassiz, 1837 (vide Martin, 1982); †P. rectangulus Linck, 1936 (vide Martin, 1982); †P. serratus Agassiz, 1838 (vide Apestigua et al., 2007); †P. szecuhanensis Young, 1942 (vide Martin, 1982); †P. viropa Oldham, 1859 (vide Martin, 1982); †P. wichmanni Apestigua et al., 2007

Synonyms
- Ceratodus acutus Priem, 1924; Ceratodus concinnus Meyer & Pleninger, 1844; Ceratodus donensis Vorobyeva and Minikh, 1968; Ceratodus ornatus Broom, 1908; Ceratodus phillipsi Agassiz, 1836; Ceratodus rectangulus Linck, 1936; Ceratodus serratus Agassiz, 1838; Ceratodus szechuanensis Young, 1942; Ferganoceratodus szechuanensis Young, 1942; Ceratodus viropa Oldham, 1859

= Ptychoceratodus =

Ptychoceratodus Temporal range: Early Triassic-Middle Jurassic ~251–163 Ma

Extinct genus of fishes

Ptychoceratodus is an extinct genus of lungfish living from Early Triassic to Middle Jurassic. It was established by Otto Jaekel for one species (P. runcinatus), transferred from Ceratodus genus. Type species is P. serratus from the Middle Triassic of Switzerland and Germany. Ptychoceratodus had two pairs of massive dental plates, bearing 4-6 acute ridges. Its skull roof was composed from massive, plate-like bones. In the central part of skull roof was localized an unossified fenestra. Most of the Ptychoceratodus findings are isolated dental plates, some associated with jaws. Other parts of skull or postcranial skeleton are relatively rarely found as fossils. The anatomy of skull is the best recognized in P. serratus, whereas less complete cranial material is available also for P. concinuus, P. phillipsi, and P. rectangulus. Although Ptychoceratodus is known exclusively from the Triassic and Jurassic, there were also Cretaceous specimens referred to this genus. However, they are more often regarded as representants of Metaceratodus. Ptychoceratodus is the only member of the family Ptychoceratodontidae. The first named species is P. phillipsi by Louis Agassiz in 1837 as a species of Ceratodus and later moved to the genus Ptychoceratodus. Occurrences of Ptychoceratodus come mainly from Europe. However, occurrences from other continents suggest it was dispersed globally during the Triassic. After 2010, the new fossil material behind the Europe was reported from South America, India, and Greenland

== Fossil distribution ==
Fossils of Ptychoceratodus have been found in:

Triassic

- Burgersdorp Formation, (Cynognathus Assemblage Zone), Early Triassic (Olenekian), South Africa (?Ptychoceratodus sp.)
- Lipovskaya Formation, Early Triassic (Olenekian), Russia (P. donensis)
- Erfurt Formation, Middle Triassic (Ladinian), Germany (P. serratus)
- Weser Formation, Carnian, Germany (P. concinnus)
- Potrerillos Formation, Carnian, Argentina (P. cuyanus)
- Tiki Formation, Carnian, India (P. oldhami)
- Marnes de Châlins Formation, Norian France (P. rectangulus)
- Löwenstein Formation, Alaunian (Norian), Germany (P. rectangulus)
- Grès à Avicula contorta Formation, Rhaetian, France (P. phillipsi)
- Santa Maria Formation, Carnian, Brazil (P. eliseui)
- Fleming Fjord Formation, Norian, Greenland (P. rectangulus)
- Grabowa Formation, Carnian, Poland (P. roemeri)

Jurassic

- Inferior Oolite Group, Middle Jurassic, England (P. phillipsi)

== See also ==
- Sarcopterygii
- List of sarcopterygians
- List of prehistoric bony fish
