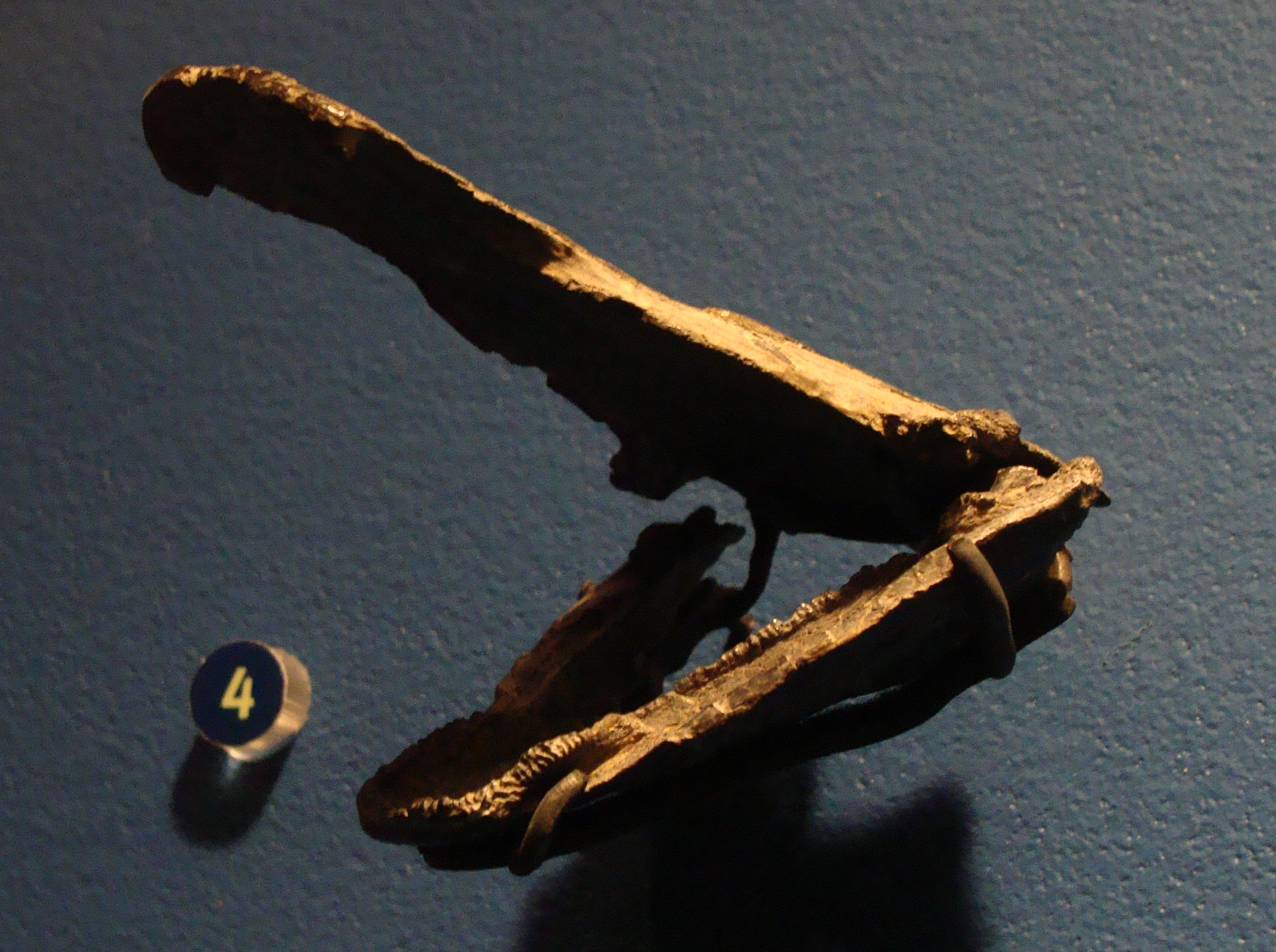

Scientific classification
- Kingdom: Animalia
- Phylum: Chordata
- Class: Dipnoi
- Order: †Uranolophina
- Family: †Uranolophidae
- Genus: †Uranolophus; Denison, 1968

Type species
- †Uranolophus wyomingensis Denison, 1968

= Uranolophus =

Uranolophus Temporal range: Late Devonian

Extinct genus of fishes

Uranolophus is a genus of prehistoric lungfish which lived during the Late Devonian period. It is the type genus of the family Uranolophidae.

== Sources ==
- Early Vertebrates by Philippe Janvier
