= Rhinodipterus =

Rhinodipterus Temporal range: Frasnian

Scientific classification
- Kingdom: Animalia
- Phylum: Chordata
- Class: Dipnoi
- Genus: †Rhinodipterus; Gross, 1956

Extinct genus of lobe-finned fish

Rhinodipterus is an extinct genus of prehistoric dipnoan sarcopterygians or lobe-finned fish, that lived in the Frasnian stage of the Devonian period. It is believed to have inhabited shallow, salt-water reefs, and is one of the earliest known examples of marine lungfish.

== Palaeobiology ==
Research based on an exceptionally well-preserved specimen from the Gogo Formation of Australia has shown that Rhinodipterus has cranial ribs attached to its braincase and was probably adapted for air-breathing to some degree as living lungfish are. This could be the only case known for a marine lungfish with air-breathing adaptations.

The jaws of Rhinodipterus were well adapted for resisting high stresses, indicating that it had a powerful bite despite its elongated, gracile snout.

== See also ==
- Sarcopterygii
- List of sarcopterygians
- List of prehistoric bony fish
