= Persephonichthys =

Persephonichthys Temporal range: Early Permian

Scientific classification
- Kingdom: Animalia
- Phylum: Chordata
- Class: Dipnoi
- Genus: †Persephonichthys
- Species: †P. chthonica

Binomial name
- †Persephonichthys chthonica Pardo et al., 2014

Extinct genus of fishes

Persephonichthys is an extinct genus of dipnoan that lived during the Cisuralian epoch.

== Distribution ==
Persephonichthys chthonica is known from Nebraska.
