= Stomiahykus =

Scientific classification
- Domain: Eukaryota
- Kingdom: Animalia
- Phylum: Chordata
- Clade: Sarcopterygii
- Class: Dipnoi
- Genus: †Stomiahykus; Bernacsek, 1977

Extinct genus of fishes

Stomiahykus is an extinct genus of prehistoric lobe-finned fish.

== See also ==
- Prehistoric fish
- List of prehistoric bony fish
