= Melanognathus =

Melanognathus Temporal range: Devonian

Scientific classification
- Domain: Eukaryota
- Kingdom: Animalia
- Phylum: Chordata
- Clade: Sarcopterygii
- Class: Dipnoi
- Order: †Uranolophina
- Family: †Uranolophidae
- Genus: †Melanognathus; Jarvik, 1967

Type species
- †Melanognathus canadensis Jarvik, 1967

Extinct genus of fishes

Melanognathus (Greek for "black jaw") is a genus of prehistoric lungfish which lived during the Devonian period.
