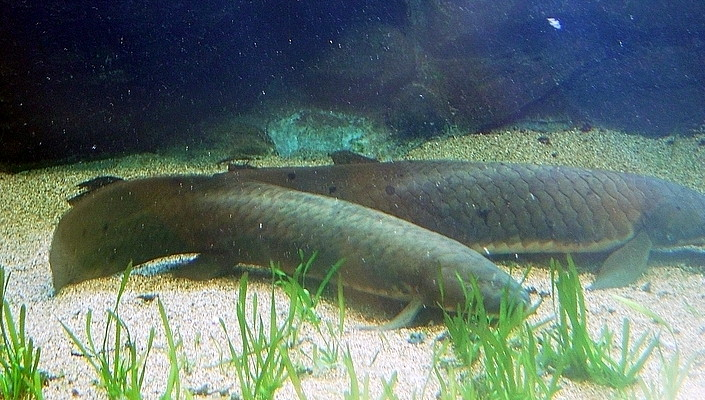
- Australian lungfish (Neoceratodus forsteri)

Scientific classification
- Kingdom: Animalia
- Phylum: Chordata
- Class: Dipnoi
- Order: Ceratodontiformes
- Family: Neoceratodontidae; Miles, 1977

Genera
- †?Equinoxiodus; †Mioceratodus; Neoceratodus

= Neoceratodontidae =

Neoceratodontidae Temporal range: Late Jurassic - recent

Family of chordates

Neoceratodontidae is a family of lungfish containing Neoceratodus (represented by the extant Australian lungfish) and the extinct Mioceratodus. It, Lepidosirenidae, and Protopteridae represent the only lungfish families still extant.

Fossils from Triassic-aged sediments in Kyrgyzstan were previously assigned to this family, but phylogenetic evidence indicates that it diverged from the common ancestors of the African and South American lungfish during the Late Jurassic.
