= Ganopristodus =

Scientific classification
- Kingdom: Animalia
- Phylum: Chordata
- Clade: Sarcopterygii
- Genus: †Ganopristodus; Traquair, 1881

Extinct genus of fishes

Ganopristodus is an extinct genus of prehistoric sarcopterygian or lobe-finned fish from the Devonian.

== See also ==
- Sarcopterygii
- List of sarcopterygians
- List of prehistoric bony fish
