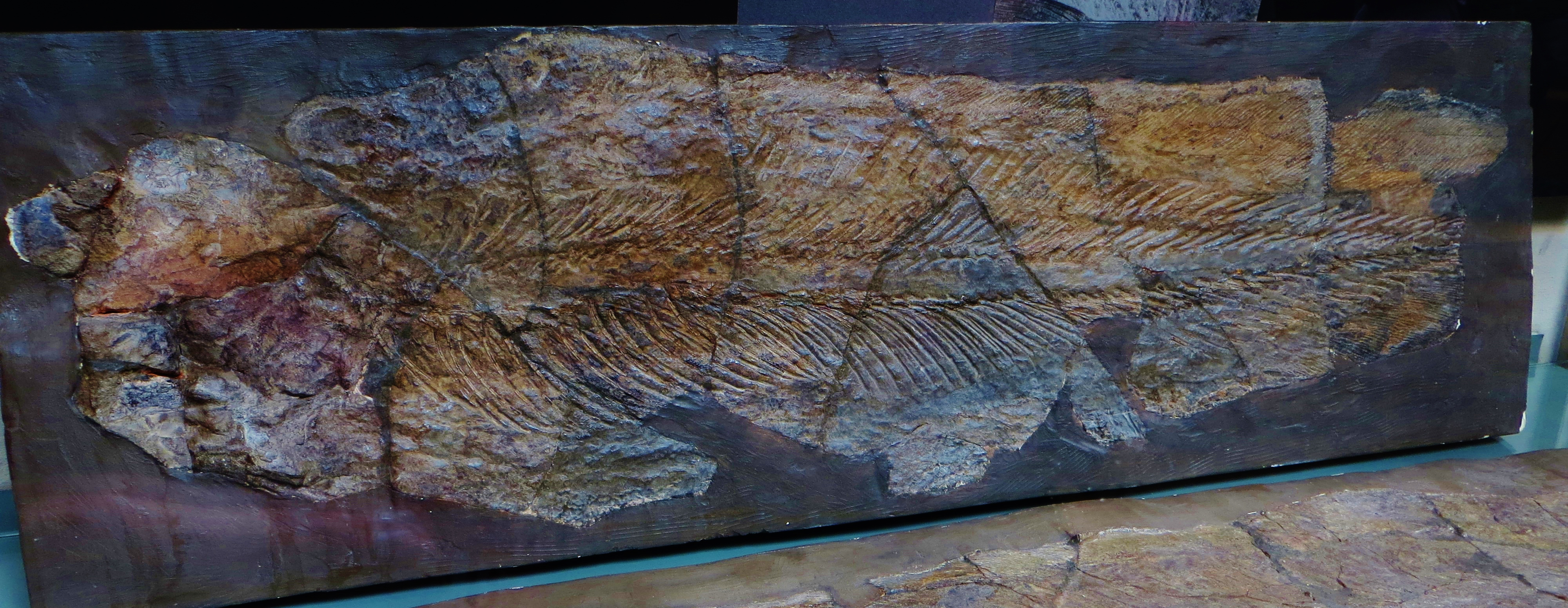

Scientific classification
- Domain: Eukaryota
- Kingdom: Animalia
- Phylum: Chordata
- Clade: Sarcopterygii
- Class: Dipnoi
- Genus: †Paraceratodus; Lehman et al., 1959

Type species
- †Paraceratodus germaini Lehman et al., 1959

= Paraceratodus =

Paraceratodus Temporal range: Late Permian - Early Triassic (but see text)

Extinct genus of fishes

Paraceratodus is an extinct genus of prehistoric lungfish. Only one species, P. germaini, is known from the latest Permian or earliest Triassic period of Madagascar. Phylogenetic evidence supports it being the most basal member of the suborder Ceratodontoidei, which contains modern lungfish, and as with the rest of the order it likely diverged during the late Carboniferous.

== See also ==
- Sarcopterygii
- List of sarcopterygians
- List of prehistoric bony fish
