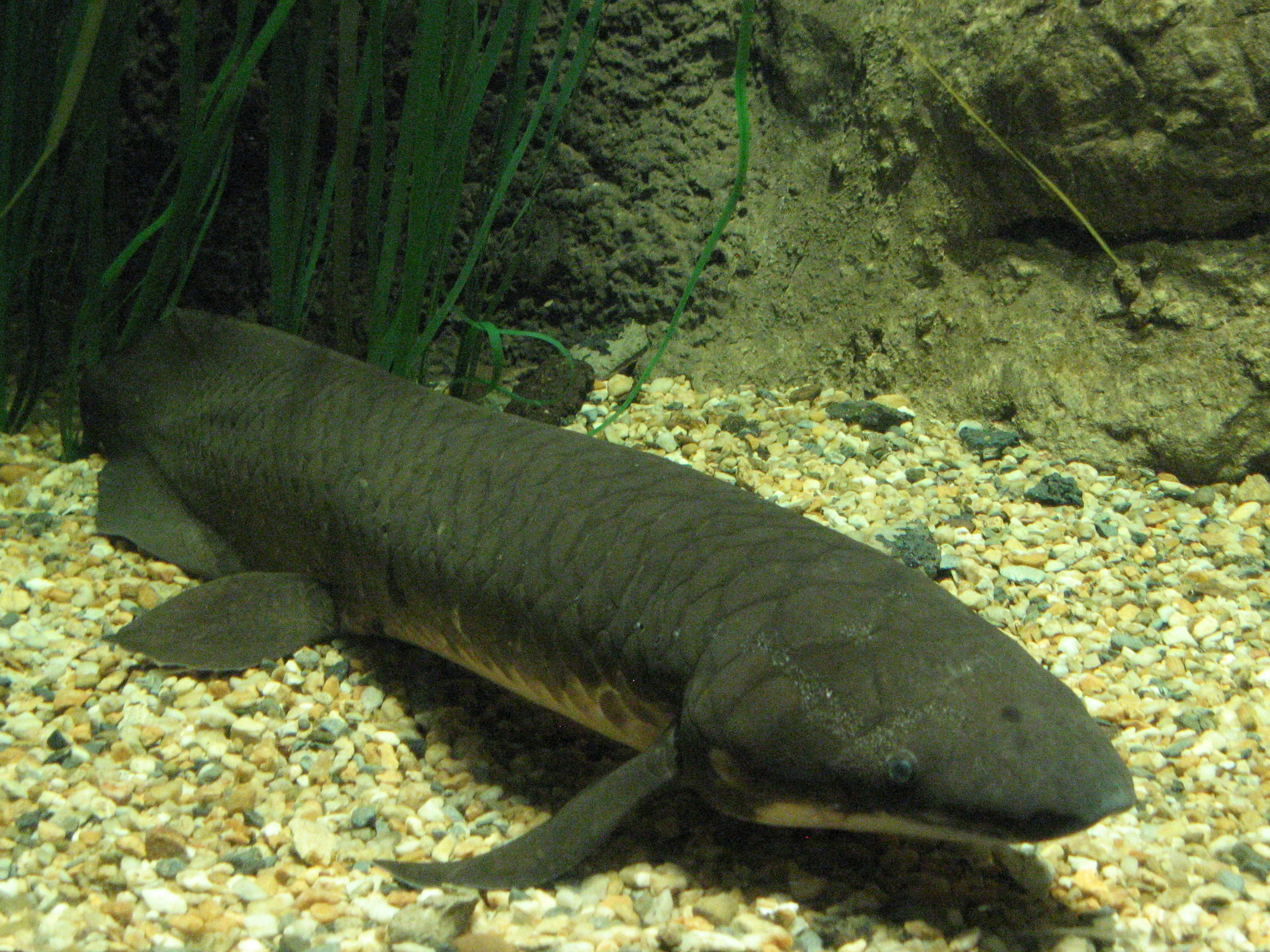
- National Zoo & Aquarium, Australia

Conservation status
- Endangered (IUCN 3.1)
- CITES Appendix II

Scientific classification
- Kingdom: Animalia
- Phylum: Chordata
- Class: Dipnoi
- Order: Ceratodontiformes
- Family: Neoceratodontidae
- Genus: Neoceratodus
- Species: N. forsteri

Binomial name
- Neoceratodus forsteri (J. L. G. Krefft, 1870)
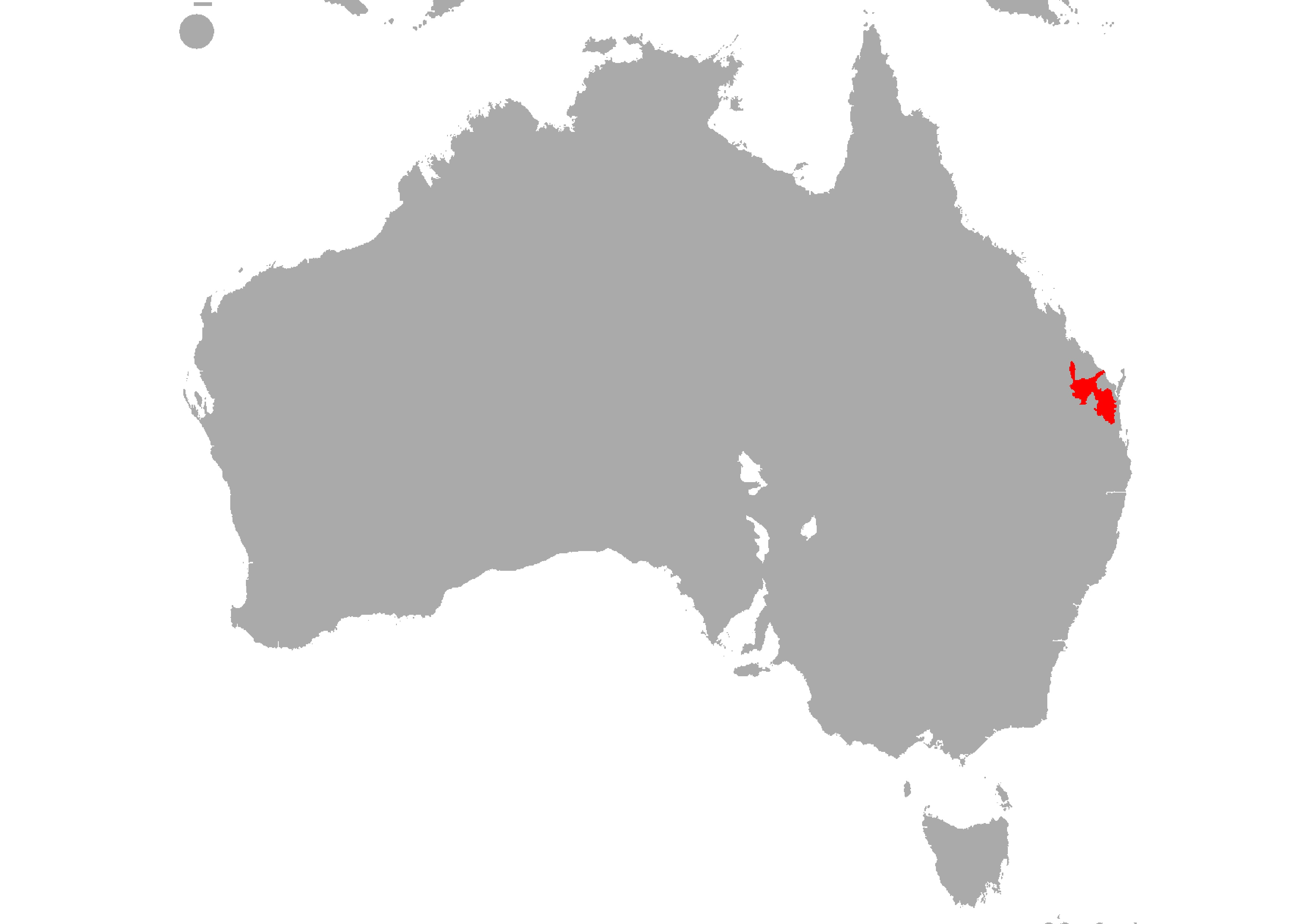

Synonyms
- Genus; Epiceratodus Teller 1891; Species; Ceratodus forsteri Krefft 1870; Epiceratodus forsteri (Krefft 1870); Ceratodus blanchardi Krefft 1870; Neoceratodus blanchardi (Krefft 1870); Ceratodus miolepis Günther 1871

= Australian lungfish =

Australian lungfish Temporal range: 28.40–0 Ma Rupelian – Recent

Species of fish

The Australian lungfish (Neoceratodus forsteri), also known as the Queensland lungfish, Burnett salmon and barramunda, is the only surviving member of the family Neoceratodontidae, and endemic to Australia. It is one of only six extant lungfish species in the world.

Fossil records of this group date back 380 million years, around the time when the higher vertebrate classes were beginning to evolve. Fossils of lungfish almost identical to this species have been uncovered in northern New South Wales, indicating that Neoceratodus has remained virtually unchanged for well over 100 million years, making it a living fossil and one of the oldest living vertebrate genera on the planet.

It is one of six extant representatives of the ancient air-breathing Dipnoi (lungfishes) that flourished during the Devonian period (about 413–365 million years ago) and is the outgroup to all other members of this lineage. The five other freshwater lungfish species, four in Africa and one in South America, are very different morphologically from N. forsteri. The Queensland lungfish can live for several days out of the water, if it is kept moist, but will not survive total water depletion, unlike its African counterparts.

The small settlement of Ceratodus in the Wide Bay–Burnett region of Queensland derives its name from that of the Australian lungfish. The species was named, by Gerard Krefft, in honour of the squatter and politician William Forster.

== Distribution and habitat ==
The Australian lungfish is native only to the Mary and Burnett River systems in south-eastern Queensland. It has been successfully distributed to other, more southerly rivers, including the Brisbane, Albert, Stanley, and Coomera Rivers, and the Enoggera Reservoir in the past century. The Australian lungfish has also been introduced to the Pine, Caboolture, and Condamine Rivers, but current survival and breeding success are unknown. Formerly widespread, at one time at least seven species of lungfish were in Australia.

This species lives in slow-flowing rivers and still water (including reservoirs) that have some aquatic vegetation on banks. It occurs over mud, sand, or gravel bottoms. Australian lungfish are commonly found in deep pools of 3–10 m (9.8–32.8 ft) depth and live in small groups under submerged logs, in dense banks of aquatic macrophytes, or in underwater caves formed by soil being washed away under tree roots on river banks. The lungfish is tolerant of cold, but prefers waters with temperatures in the range 15–25 °C (59–77 °F).

The Australian lungfish cannot survive complete desiccation of its habitat, but it can live out of water for several days if the surface of its skin is constantly moist. Unlike the African species, Protopterus, it does not survive dry seasons by secreting a mucous cocoon and burying itself in the mud.

The Australian lungfish is essentially a sedentary species, spending its life within a restricted area. Its home range rarely extends beyond a single pool or, occasionally, two adjacent pools. It does not follow a set migratory path, but may actively seek out suitable spawning habitats between July and December.

== Description ==
Australian lungfish are olive-green to dull brown on the back, sides, tail, and fins, and pale yellow to orange on the underside. They have been described as having a reddish colouring on their sides which gets much brighter in the males during the breeding season. This colouration is the only obvious distinguishing sexual characteristic of the lungfish. They have stout elongated bodies and flattened heads with small eyes. The eyes have five types of photoreceptors; four types of cones and a rod. Some of these photoreceptors can reach 20–24 μm in diameter, possibly the largest in the animal kingdom. The mouth is small and in a subterminal position. The lungfish can grow to a length of about 150 cm (4.9 ft), and a weight of 43 kg (95 lb). It is commonly found to be about 100 cm (3.3 ft) and 20 kg (44 lb) on average. Both sexes follow similar growth patterns, although the females grow to a slightly larger size. They are covered in slime when taken from the water.

The skeleton of the lungfish is partly bone and partly cartilage. The vertebrae are pure cartilage, while the ribs are hollow tubes filled with a cartilaginous substance. The body of the lungfish is covered with large, bony scales. Ten rows occur on each side, grading to small scales on the fins. The scales are each embedded in their own pockets, and overlap extensively, such that vulnerable areas of the body are covered by a thickness of at least four scales. Two unusually large and thick interlocking scales cover the back of the head where the bony skull is thin. Their cranial muscles (around the skull and jaw) follow similar patterns observed in other vertebrates, whereby the muscles tend to first develop from anterior to posterior, and from their region of origin toward insertion. They have powerful long paddle-shaped diphycercal tails. Unlike all other extant lungfish species, the pectoral fins and pelvic fins are large, fleshy, and flipper-like. The dorsal fin commences in the middle of the back and is confluent with the caudal and anal fins.

The dentition of the lungfish is unusual: two incisors, restricted to the upper jaw, are flat, slightly bent, and denticulated on the hind margin. These are followed by dental plates on the upper and lower jaws.

Juveniles have different body proportions from mature adults. The head is rounder, the fins are smaller, and the trunk is more slender. Also, the brain is relatively larger and fills more of the cranial cavity in juveniles compared to adults. The mouth is initially terminal, but shifts back as the fish grows. The dorsal fin typically reaches to the back of the head in young juveniles, and gradually moves caudally until it only extends to the mid-dorsal region in adults. They show a gradual change in body form as they develop, but no metamorphosis is externally detectable and no obvious point occurs at which they can be termed adult. As a juvenile, the lungfish is distinctly mottled with a base colour of gold or olive-brown. Patches of intense dark pigment will persist long after the mottling has disappeared. Young lungfish are capable of rapid colour change in response to light, but this ability is gradually lost as the pigment becomes denser.

The lungfish is reputed to be sluggish and inactive, but it is capable of rapid escape movements using its strong tail. It is usually quiet and unresponsive by day, becoming more active in the late afternoon and evening.

== Breathing ==
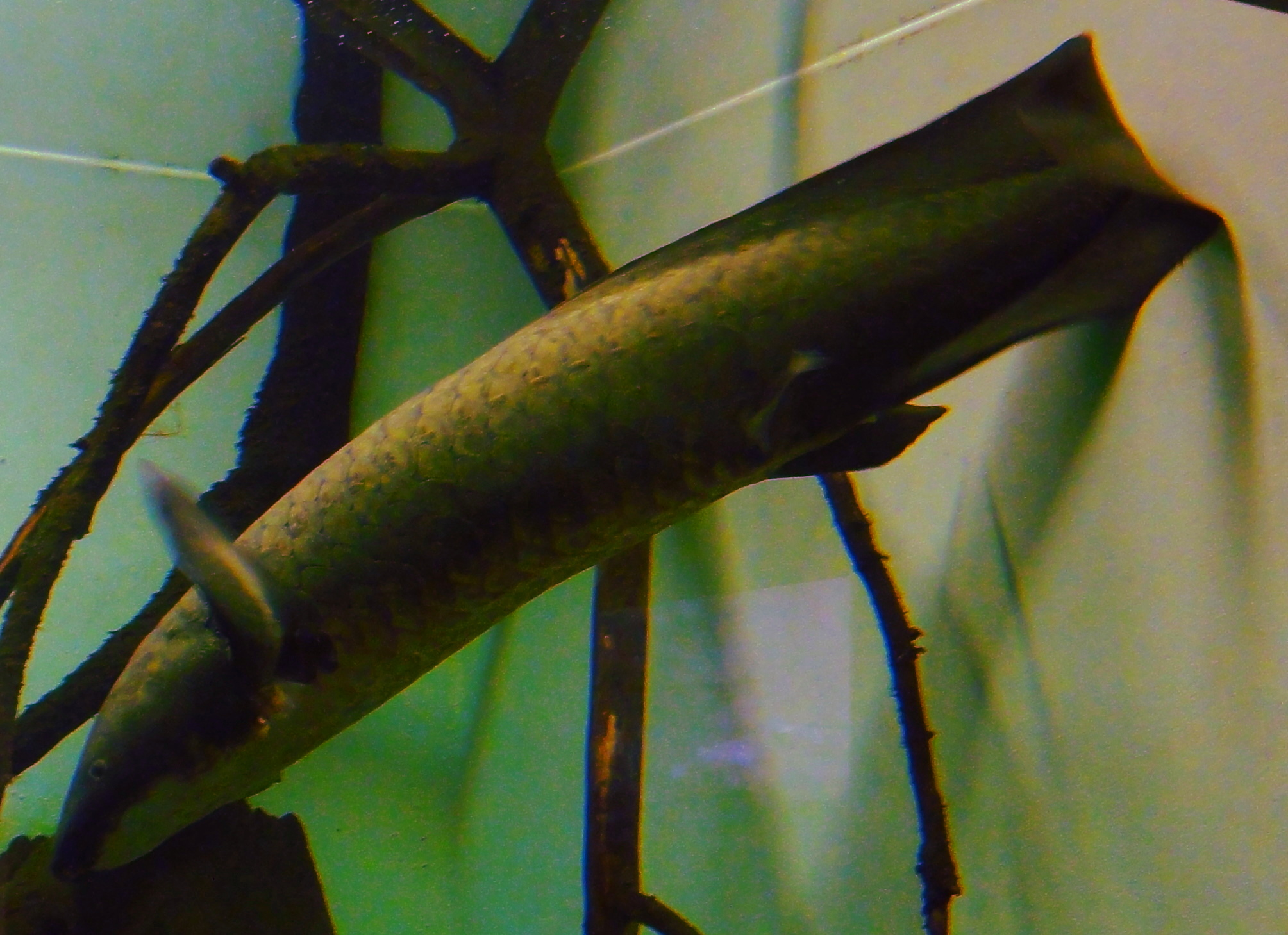
A Queensland lungfish in the Frankfurt Zoological Garden

A distinctive characteristic of the Australian lungfish is the presence of a single dorsal lung, used to supplement the oxygen supply through the gills. During times of excessive activity, drought, or high temperatures (when water becomes deoxygenated), or when prevailing conditions inhibit normal functioning of the gills, the lungfish can rise to the surface and swallow air into its lung. More frequent air breathing is correlated with periods of greater activity at night when it uses the lung as a supplementary organ of respiration.

Unlike the South American and African lungfishes, the Australian species has gills on all the first four gill arches, while the fifth arch bears a hemibranch. It is also the only facultative air breather lungfish species, only breathing air when oxygen in the water is not sufficient to meet their needs. The lung is a single long sac situated above and extending the length of the body cavity, and is formed by a ventral outgrowth of the gut. Internally, the lung is divided into two distinct lobes that interconnect along its length, compartmentalized by the infolding of the walls. Each compartment is further divided to form a spongy alveolar region. Blood capillaries run through this region close enough to the air space in the lung to enable gas exchange. Lungfish breathe in using a buccal force-pump similar to that of amphibians. The contraction of smooth muscles in the walls of the lung results in exhalation.

The sound of the lungfish exhaling air at the surface prior to inhaling a fresh breath has been compared to that made by a small bellows. Young lungfish come to the surface to breathe air when they are about 25 mm (0.98 in) long.

== Reproduction and development ==
The Australian lungfish spawns and completes its entire lifecycle in freshwater systems. The age of first breeding is estimated to be 17 years for males and 22 years for females. Males typically become mature at 738–790 mm (29.1–31.1 in) and females at 814–854 mm (32.0–33.6 in). After an elaborate courtship, the lungfish spawn in pairs, depositing large adhesive eggs amongst aquatic plants. They spawn from August until November, before the spring rains, in flowing streams that are at least a metre deep.

Eggs are most abundant during September and October. The stimulus for spawning is believed to be day length. The lungfish is known to spawn both during the day and at night. The lungfish is selective in its choice of spawning sites. Eggs have been recorded on aquatic plants rooted in gravel and sand, slow- and fast-moving waters, in shade and in full sun, but never on aquatic plants covered with slimy algae, in stagnant water, or where loose debris was on the water's surface.

Contrary to its South American and African relatives, the Australian lungfish does not make a nest or guard or care for its eggs. When spawning does take place, the pair of fish will lie on their sides or become entwined. They usually deposit their eggs singly, occasionally in pairs, but very rarely in clusters. The male lungfish fertilizes each egg as it emerges, and the eggs are deposited in dense aquatic vegetation. The newly laid egg is hemispherical, delicate, heavily yolked, and enclosed in a single vitelline and triple jelly envelope. The egg about 3 mm (0.12 in) in diameter; with the jelly envelope, it has a total diameter of about 1 cm (0.39 in). The egg is sticky for a short while until silt and small aquatic organisms have covered it, but long enough for it to become attached to submerged vegetation. It is negatively buoyant, and if it falls to the lake or river bed, it is unlikely to survive to hatching.

The female has a large ovary and the potential to lay many eggs, but in the wild only produces a few hundreds of eggs, at most, during her lifetime. In captivity, 200 to 600 eggs have been laid in a single event. The lungfish does not necessarily spawn every year. A good spawning season occurs usually once every five years, regardless of environmental conditions.

The eggs and young are similar to those of frogs, but the offspring differ from both frogs and other lungfishes by the absence of external gills during early development. Within the egg, head structures and pigmentation start to appear by day 17. They hatch after three to four weeks, and resemble tadpoles. The young fish are slow-growing, reportedly reaching 27 mm (1.1 in) after 110 days, and about 60 mm (2.4 in) after 8 months. During the first week, it lies on its side, hiding in the weeds, and moving only when stimulated by touch. It will swim spontaneously, and often retreat back into the gelatinous envelope when disturbed. Newly hatched larvae develop a ciliary current over their skin and gill surfaces. This is believed to either provide respiratory exchange across the skin and gills without necessitating any movements of the jaw or brachial apparatus, or to keep the skin of the unprotected larvae free of debris, parasites, and predatory protozoans. Larvae are reported not to feed for two to three weeks while the yolk is still present. By the time the yolk is fully used, a spiral valve has developed in the intestine and the fish starts to feed. The young can grow about 50 mm (2.0 in) per month under optimal conditions.

The Australian lungfish has very complex courtship behaviour made up of three distinct phases. The first is the searching phase, when the fish will range over a large area, possibly searching for potential spawning sites. A pair of fish will perform circling movements at the surface of the water close to beds of aquatic plants. They breathe air more frequently and more noisily than normal, possibly reflecting a greater physiological requirement for oxygen. Individual fish have been observed to breathe air at regular intervals of about 20 minutes, with air breathing accompanied by a distinct loud burp made in the air. The noisy breathing may be a form of a mating call. The lungfish seem to do their noisy breathing in concert, even responding to each other, but never in close vicinity of where the eggs are laid.

The next phase involves behaviour, similar to "follow-the-leader", during which one fish, the male, shows interest in the female and nudges her with his snout. Up to eight individuals may be involved in follow-the-leader behaviour. The male lungfish may occasionally take a piece of aquatic plant into its mouth and wave it around. In the third phase, the fish dive together through aquatic vegetation, the male following the female and presumably shedding milt over the eggs.

Adults have a high survival rate and are long-lived (at least 20–25 years). An Australian lungfish named "Granddad" at the Shedd Aquarium in Chicago was the oldest living fish in any Aquarium, and was already an adult when he was first placed on display in 1933; Granddad was estimated to be at least in his eighties, and possibly over one-hundred, at the time of his death on February 5, 2017. Analysis of Granddad's DNA later estimated him to be roughly 109 years old (with an error margin of ±6 years) at the time of his death, and that he was originally captured from the Burnett River in Australia before being transported to the Shedd Aquarium. This discovery also cements the Australian lungfish as the longest-lived subtropical freshwater fish species currently known to science, and one of the 12 longest-living fish species in the world.

The Australian lungfish has an unusually large karyotype, very large chromosomes and cells, and a high nuclear DNA content relative to other vertebrates, but less than what is reported for other lungfishes. In spite of this, it displays low genetic diversity between populations from the Mary, Burnett, and Brisbane catchments. This low level of genetic variation could be attributed to population "bottlenecks" associated with periods of range contraction, probably during the Pleistocene, and in recent times during the periods of episodic or prolonged drought that are known to reduce some reaches of these river systems.

== Diet and feeding habits ==
The Australian lungfish is primarily nocturnal, and is essentially carnivorous. In captivity, it will feed on frogs, earthworms, pieces of meat, and pelleted food. In the wild, its prey includes frogs, tadpoles, fishes, a variety of invertebrates, and plant material. No quantitative dietary data are available, but anecdotal observations clearly indicate the diet of the lungfish changes with development. This is proven to be correlated with a change in dentition.

Lungfish larvae are bottom feeders. They eat micro-crustaceans and small Tubifex worms, occasionally supplementing their diets with filamentous algae. Soft foods such as worms and plants are partially crushed with a few quick bites and then swallowed. In the adult lungfish, movement of the prey in and out of the mouth is accompanied by strong adduction of the jaws. This crushing mechanism is coupled with hydraulic transport of the food, achieved by movements of the hyoid apparatus, to position the prey within the oral cavity. The Queensland lungfish exhibits the most primitive version of these biomechanical feeding adaptations and behaviors.

== Conservation status ==
Although the status of the Australian lungfish is secure, it is a protected species under the Queensland Fish and Oyster Act 1914 and capture in the wild is strictly prohibited. It was placed on the CITES list in 1977. The lungfish is currently protected from fishing, and collection for education or research purposes requires a permit in Queensland, under the Fisheries Act of 1994, and from the Commonwealth Government. It was included on the list of "vulnerable" species under the Environment Protection and Biodiversity Conservation Act 1999, as studies have failed to show it meets the criteria needed to be considered a threatened or endangered species. However, the species has been classified as Endangered on the International Union for Conservation of Nature (IUCN) Red List as of 2019.

Human activities currently threaten the Australian lungfish, particularly water development. It is potentially at risk in much of its core distribution in the Burnett and Mary Rivers, as 26% of these river systems are presently impounded by weirs and dams. Barriers to movement and altered flow regimens downstream of dams for irrigation purposes could lead to the disruption of existing population structure and cause even more loss of genetic variation. Researcher Anne Kemp has documented the decline of lungfish in many reservoirs and river systems due to lack of recruitment caused by dams.

Australian lungfish can be very fast-growing, yet with a delayed first breeding age. For a long-lived species with naturally low mortality rates, successful spawning and juvenile recruitment is not essential every year and may only occur irregularly in medium to long cycles, even in natural environments. The length of these cycles could easily mask the potentially deleterious impacts on recruitment for many years. Additionally, large adults could remain common for decades and give no indication of a declining population in the longer term.

The Mozambique mouthbrooder, or tilapia, has been declared a noxious and threatening alien species to the lungfish in Queensland.

== Recent events ==
Proposed 2006 damming projects on both the Mary and Burnett rivers threatened the habitat of the remaining lungfish. The dams would have changed the flow of the rivers, eliminating the slow, shallow areas the fish need for spawning. Scientists worldwide became involved in saving the habitat for these lungfish, citing their evolutionary importance.

As of January 2022, the world's oldest living aquarium fish is a 90-year-old named Methuselah. At 4 feet long and 40 pounds, the lungfish resides at the California Academy of Sciences' Steinhart Aquarium in San Francisco. Methuselah inherited the title from Granddad. Granddad, another Australian lungfish, died at the age of 109 at Chicago's Shedd Aquarium in 2017.

== Relationship with humans ==
In a 2021 FlyLife article, Karl Brandt proposed the Australian lungfish as the inspiration for Gurangatch, the legendary reptile fish from Gandangara mythology.

== See also ==
- Gerard Krefft § Queensland lungfish (Neoceratodus forsteri)
- Ompax spatuloides
