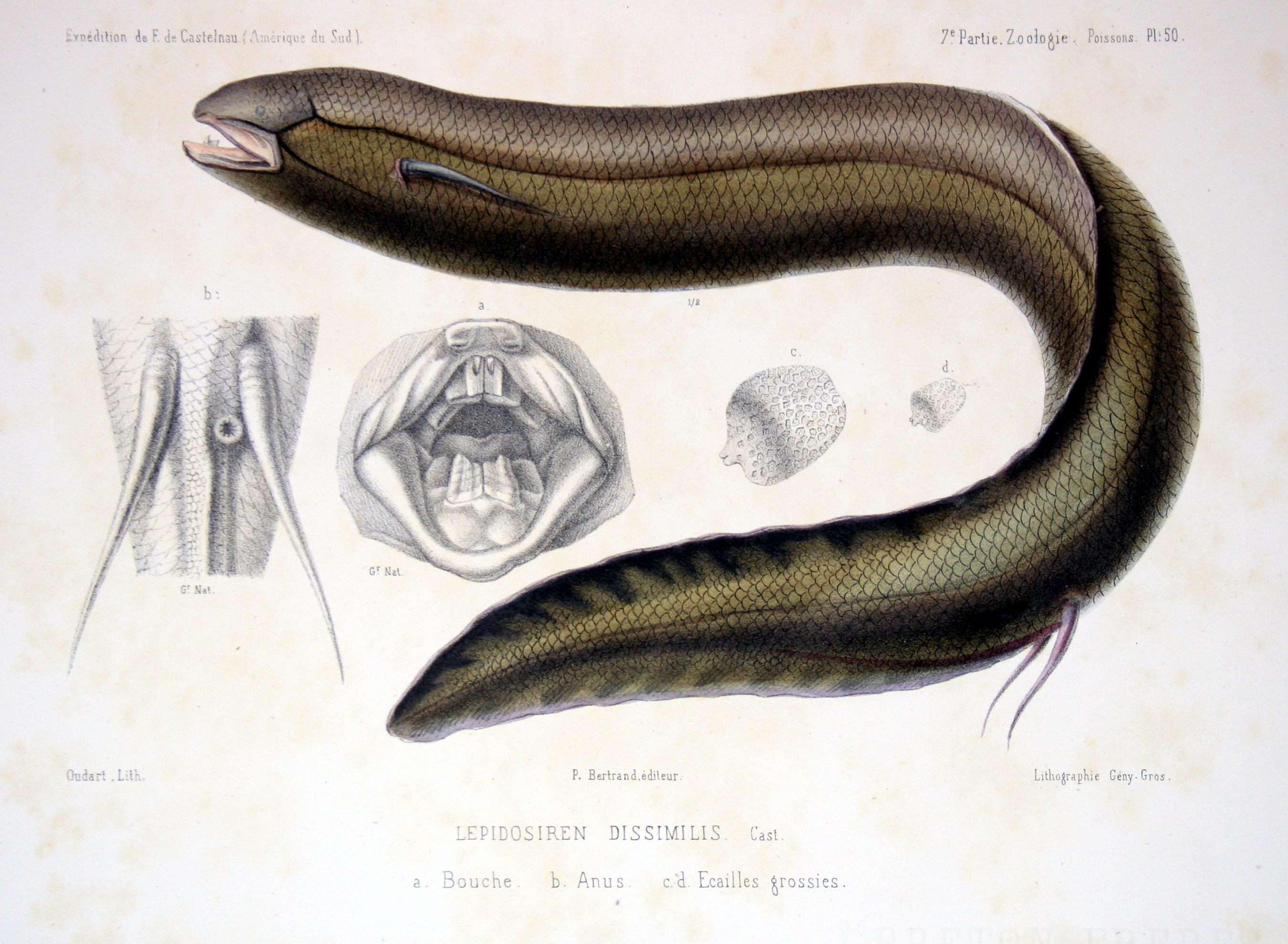

Conservation status
- Least Concern (IUCN 3.1)

Scientific classification
- Kingdom: Animalia
- Phylum: Chordata
- Class: Dipnoi
- Order: Ceratodontiformes
- Family: Lepidosirenidae; Bonaparte, 1841
- Genus: Lepidosiren; Fitzinger, 1837
- Species: L. paradoxa

Binomial name
- Lepidosiren paradoxa Fitzinger, 1837
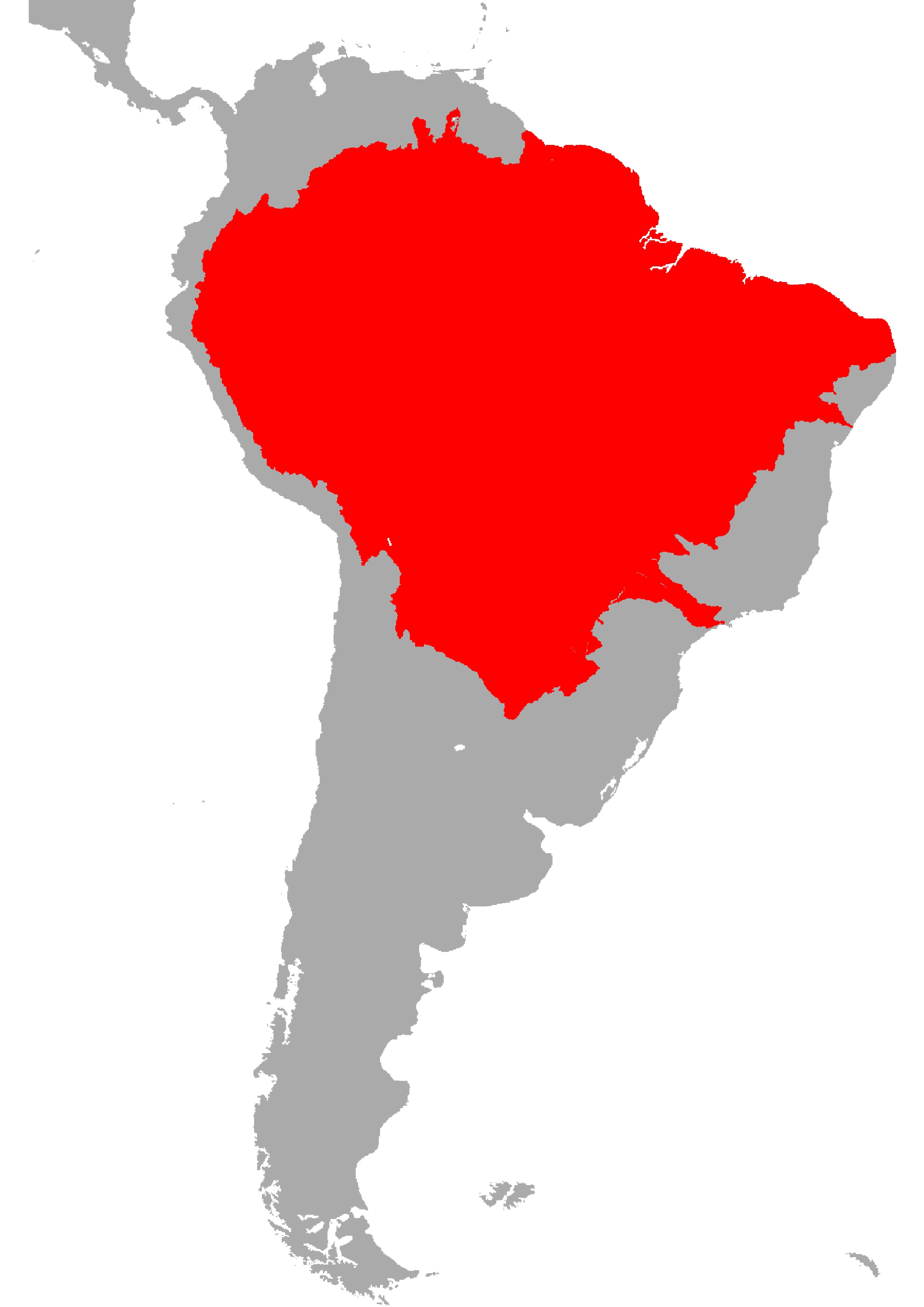

Synonyms
- (Genus): Amphibichthys Hogg 1841; (Species): Amphibichthys paradoxus (Fitzinger 1837); Lepidosiren articulata Ehlers 1894

= South American lungfish =

South American lungfish Temporal range: Late Cretaceous to recent 72.1–0 Ma

Species of fish

The South American lungfish (Lepidosiren paradoxa), also known as the American mud-fish and scaly salamanderfish, is the single species of lungfish found in swamps and slow-moving waters of the Amazon, Paraguay, and lower Paraná River basins in South America. Notable as an obligate air-breather, it is the sole member of its family Lepidosirenidae, although some authors also place Protopterus in the family. In Brazil, it is known by the indigenous language Tupi name piramboia, which means "snake-fish" (Portuguese pronunciation: [piɾɐ̃ˈbɔjjɐ]), and synonyms pirarucu-bóia ([piɾɐɾuˈku ˈbɔjjɐ]), traíra-bóia ([tɾɐˈiɾɐ ˈbɔjjɐ]), and caramuru ([kɐɾɐmuˈɾu]).

== Taxonomy ==
The South American lungfish is most closely related to the African lungfishes (family Protopteridae), and both families are thought to have diverged during the Early Cretaceous. Some papers suggest classifying both Lepidosiren and Protopterus within Lepidosirenidae, though authorities continue to classify both as distinct families.

== Description ==
The immature lungfish is spotted with gold on a black background; in the adult, this fades to a brown or gray color. Its tooth-bearing premaxillary and maxillary bones are fused as in all Dipnoi. South American lungfish also share an autostylic jaw suspension (where the palatoquadrate is fused to the cranium) and powerful adductor jaw muscles with the other extant Dipnoi. Like the African lungfishes, this species has an elongated, almost eel-like body. It may reach a length of 125 cm (4.10 ft). The pectoral fins are thin and thread-like, while the pelvic fins are somewhat larger, and set far back. The fins are connected to the shoulder by a single bone, which is a marked difference from most fish, whose fins usually have at least four bones at their base, and a marked similarity with nearly all land-dwelling vertebrates. The gills are greatly reduced and essentially non-functional in the adults.

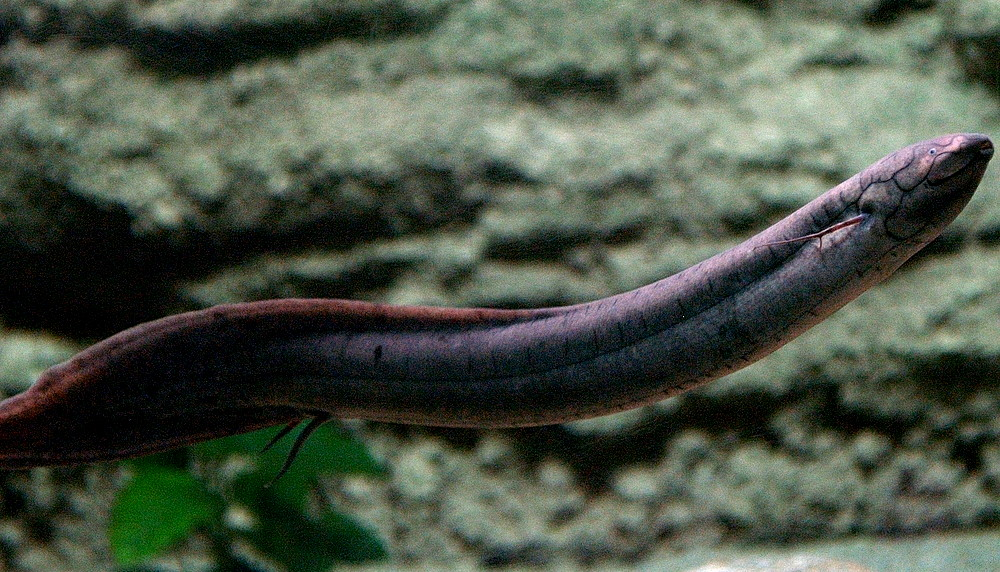

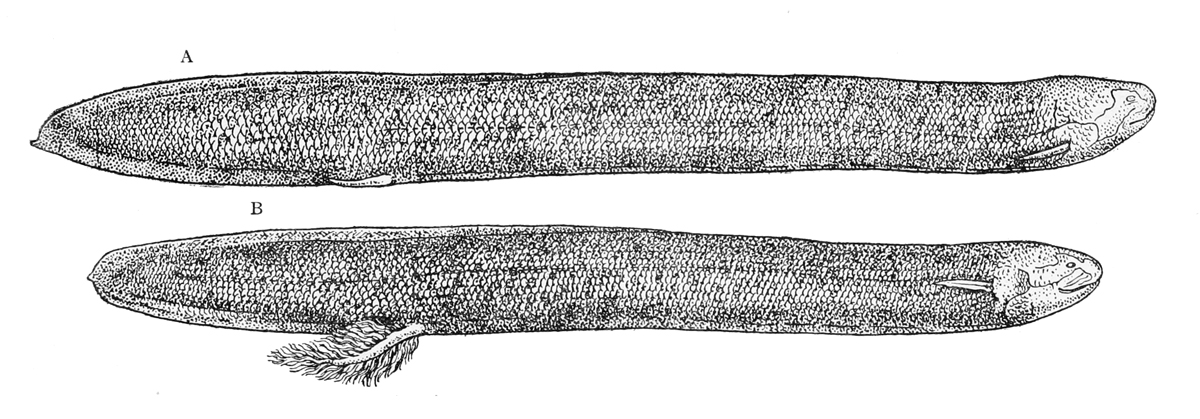
Female above, male below

Juvenile lungfish feed on insect larvae and snails, while adults are omnivorous, adding algae and shrimp to their diets, crushing them with their heavily mineralized tooth-plates. The fish's usual habitats disappear during the dry season, so they burrow into the mud and make a chamber about 30–50 cm (12–20 in) down, leaving a few holes to the surface for air. During this aestivation, they produce a layer of mucus to seal in moisture, and slow their metabolism down greatly.

Relatively little is known about the South American lungfish. They have adapted to cope with both droughts and floods due to evolving pulmonary mechanoreceptors. When the rainy season begins, they come out and begin to mate. The parents build a nest for the young, which resemble tadpoles and have four external gills. To enrich the oxygen in the nest, the male develops highly vascularized structures on his pelvic fins that release additional oxygen into the water. The young become air-breathing at about seven weeks. Juveniles have external threadlike gills very much like those of newts. Fossils of the modern species have been found between 72 and 66 mya during the Maastrichtian stage of the late Cretaceous just before the KPG extinction that killed off the non-avian dinosaurs.

As of August 2024, L. paradoxa has one of the longest genomes of any species (91 billion bases, 30 times as many as the human genome). The largest genome belongs to the marbled lungfish, with 130 billion bases. PiRNA, a type of RNA that normally suppresses transposon activity, was found in low levels in the animal and is possibly among the causes of such a large genome.

== See also ==
- Genome § Genome size
