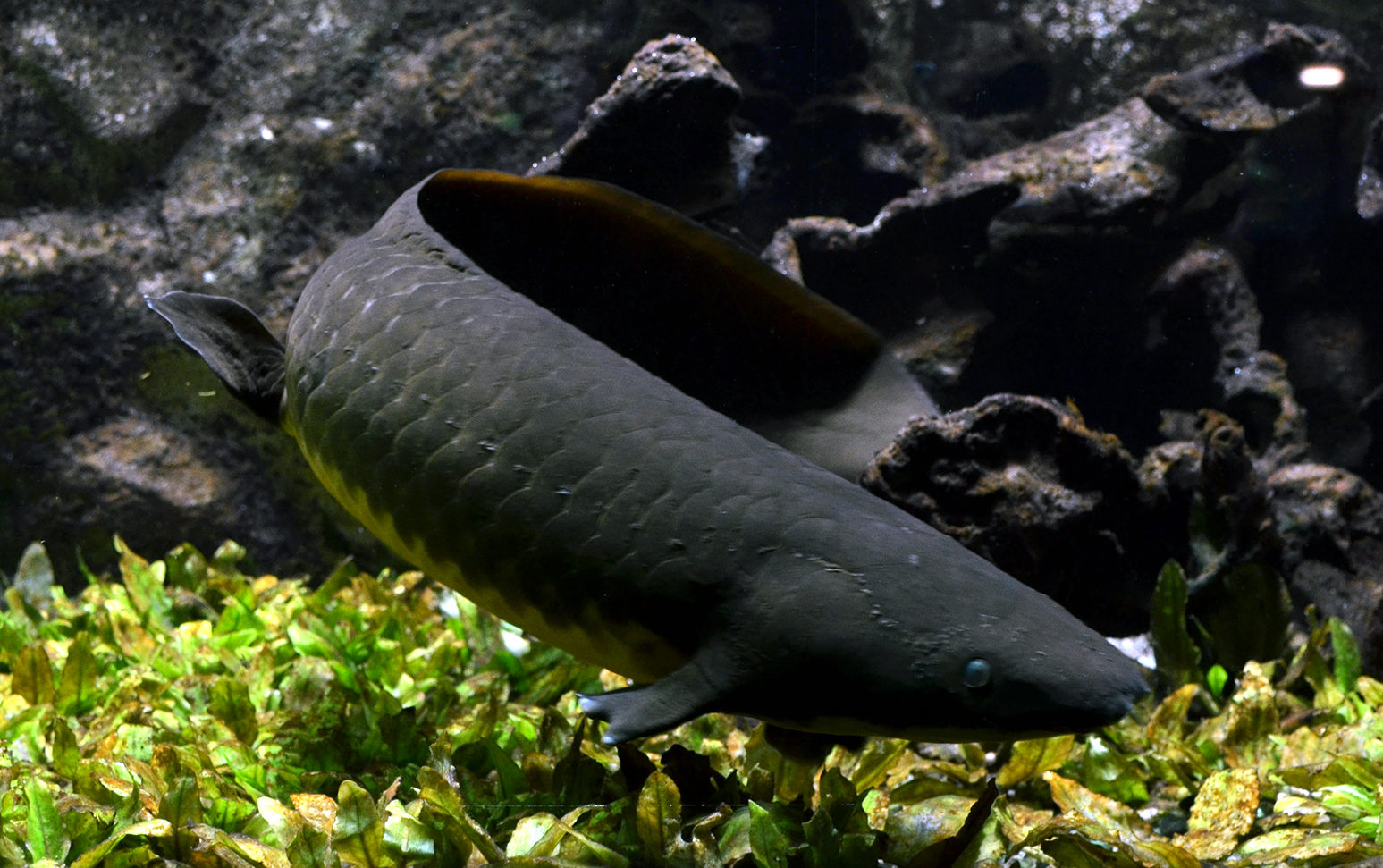
- Neoceratodus forsteri, a neoceratodontid
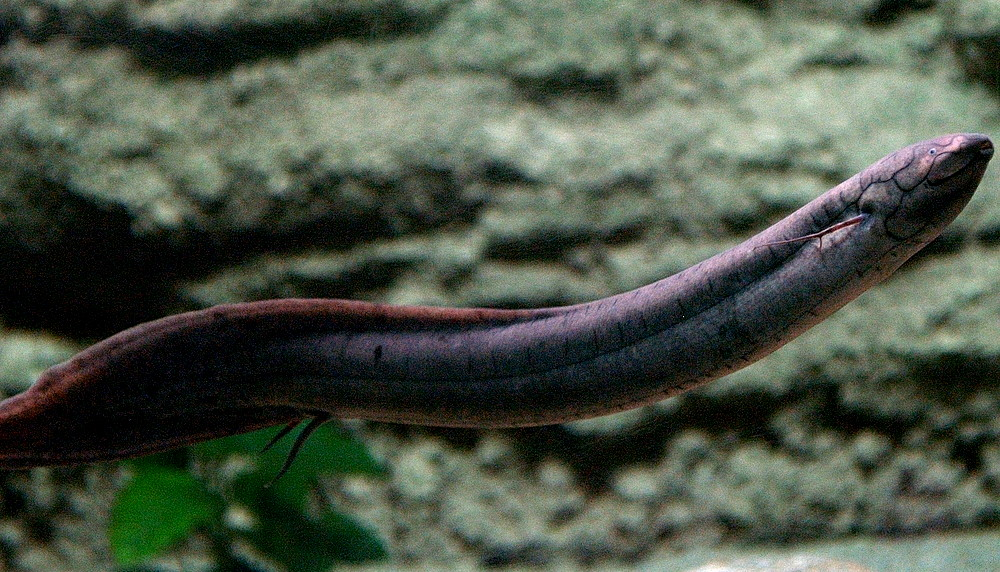
- Lepidosiren paradoxa, a lepidosirenid

Scientific classification
- Kingdom: Animalia
- Phylum: Chordata
- Clade: Rhipidistia
- Clade: Dipnomorpha
- Class: Dipnoi
- Order: Ceratodontiformes; Berg, 1940

Type genus
- †Ceratodus Agassiz, 1837

Families
- Neoceratodontidae; Lepidosirenidae; Protopteridae; Several extinct, see text
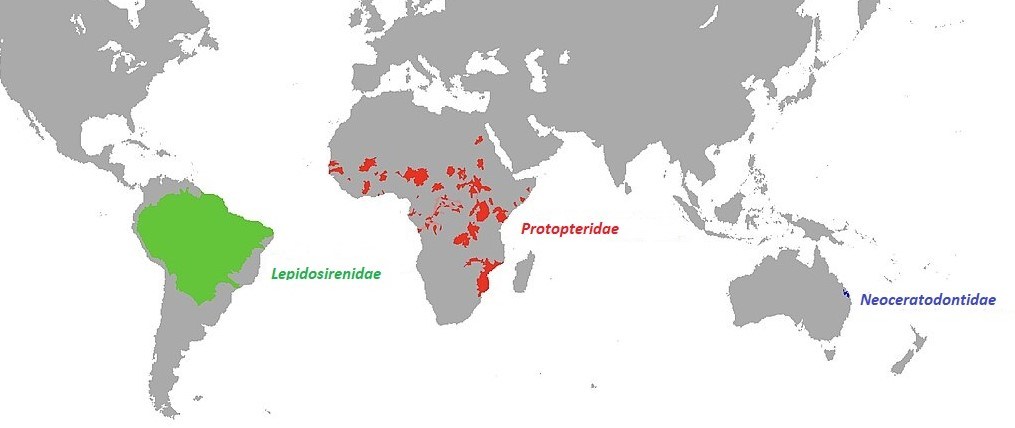
- Native distribution of Ceratodontiformes

Synonyms
- Lepidosireniformes L. S. Berg, 1940 (per Fowler, 1947)

= Ceratodontiformes =

Ceratodontiformes Temporal range: Late Carboniferous - Holocene, 318.1 - 0 mya

Suborder of fishes

Ceratodontiformes is the only extant order of lungfish, containing the families Neoceratodontidae, Lepidosirenidae, and Protopteridae as well as many other extinct groups. Members of this group are the only lungfish known to have survived the Permian-Triassic extinction event. Although lungfish originated in marine environments, the Ceratodontiformes have been an exclusively freshwater group since the Carboniferous. This order was formerly considered the suborder Ceratodontoidei.

All lungfish of the order can and often do estivate (except the spotted African lungfish, which can but rarely does so). All members of the order are obligatory air-breathers; only the Australian lungfish has functioning gills when adult; members of the Lepidosirenidae have gills only when they are larvae. The South American and African lungfish also all have generally small scales and two lungs as opposed to the Australian lungfish's single lung.

== Taxonomy ==
The suborder was formerly defined as being within the order Ceratodontiformes and including the families Neoceratodontidae and Ceratodontidae, as they were formerly thought to be closely related to one another. However, phylogenetic analyses indicate that this classification is paraphyletic, as Ceratodontidae was found to be a sister group to a clade containing Lepidosirenidae, which was formerly classified as Lepidosireniformes, a distinct order from Ceratodontiformes. Due to this, Lepidosireniformes and Ceratodontiformes were redefined as families within the order Ceratodontiformes, redefined as including all lungfish more closely allied with Neoceratodontidae and Lepidosirenidae.

This order contains the following subtaxa:

- Order Ceratodontiformes
  - Genus †Ameghinoceratodus
  - Genus †Chaoceratodus
  - Genus †Ferganoceratodus
  - Genus †Gosfordia
  - Genus †Paraceratodus
  - Genus †Permoceratodus
  - Genus †Potamoceratodus
  - Genus †Sinoceratodus
  - Family †Arganodontidae (sometimes synonymized with Asiatoceratodontidae or placed within Ceratodontidae)
  - Family †Asiatoceratodontidae
  - Family †Ceratodontidae
  - Family †Gnathorhizidae
  - Suborder Lepidosirenoidei
    - Family Protopteridae
    - Family ?†Lavocatodidae
    - Family Lepidosirenidae
  - Family Neoceratodontidae
  - Family †Ptychoceratodontidae

Some of these groups, such as Ceratodontidae, are thought to be paraphyletic due to being based entirely on morphology. Other groups are often synonymized with one another or subsumed within others, due to the taxonomic confusion surrounding this group.

=== Phylogenies ===
Kemp et al (2017) found the following taxonomy based on morphological evidence:

- Ceratodontoidei
  - †Paraceratodus
  - - †Ferganoceratodus
    - - Neoceratodontidae
      - - - - - Lepidosirenidae
              - Protopteridae
            - †Gnathorhizidae
          - †Ptychoceratodontidae
        - †Ceratodontidae

Based on this treatment, the oldest fossils of the Ceratodontiformes are of Gnathorhizidae from the Late Carboniferous, which are thought to be closely related to modern Lepidosirenidae and Protopteridae. This would indicate that the order itself originated slightly earlier in the late Carboniferous and rapidly diversified into the multiple families between then and the start of the Permian, leading to a very deep split between the Neoceratodontidae and the Lepidosirenidae + Protopteridae.

Brownstein, Harrington & Near (2023) found a different taxonomy, based on both phylogenetic and morphological evidence. In this treatment, the former Lepidosirenformes is kept.

- Ceratodontiformes
  - †Gnathorhizidae
  - - †Ceratodontidae
    - - †Gosfordia
      - - †Paraceratodus
        - - †Ptychoceratodontidae
          - - - Neoceratodontidae
              - †Ferganoceratodus
            - "Lepidosireniformes"
              - ?†Lavocatodidae
              - - Lepidosirenidae
                - Protopteridae

This analysis found a more recent divergence, with the Neoceratodontidae and the "Lepidosireniformes" diverging during the Late Jurassic, in contrast to the Paleozoic divergences estimated by Kemp et al's morphological study. This divergence was found to be tied to the breakup of Gondwana during the same time.
