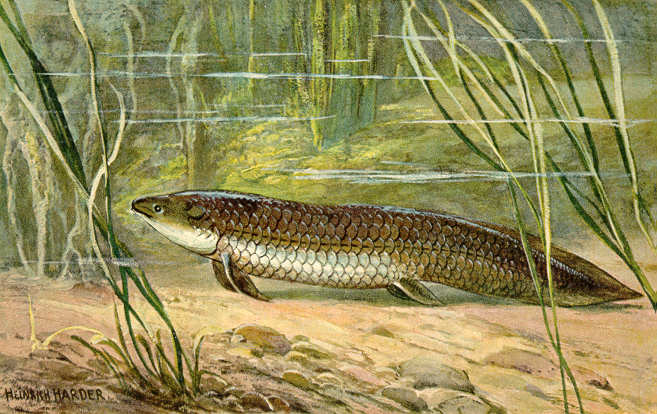
- Illustration of Ceratodus by Heinrich Harder

Scientific classification
- Kingdom: Animalia
- Phylum: Chordata
- Class: Dipnoi
- Order: Ceratodontiformes
- Family: †Ceratodontidae
- Genus: †Ceratodus; Agassiz, 1837

Type species
- †Ceratodus latissimus Agassiz, 1837

Other species
- Many more, see text

= Ceratodus =

Ceratodus Temporal range: 251.2–55 Ma Olenekian-Eocene (Ypresian)

Extinct genus of fishes

Ceratodus (from Ancient Greek: κέρας, romanized: kéras, lit. 'horn' and ὀδούς, odoús, 'tooth') is an extinct genus of freshwater lungfish that was found worldwide during the Mesozoic Era. It has been described as a "catch all", and a "form genus" used to refer to the remains, typically toothplates, of a variety of lungfish belonging to the extinct family Ceratodontidae. Fossil evidence dates back to the Early Triassic. A wide range of fossil species from different time periods have been found around the world in places such as the United States, Brazil, Argentina, Greenland, England, Germany, Egypt, Madagascar, China, and Australia. Ceratodus is believed to have become extinct sometime around the beginning of the Eocene Epoch.

== Species ==
The following species are known:

- C. latissimus Agassiz, 1837 (type species) - Late Triassic (Rhaetian) of England (Westbury Formation)
- C. eruciferus Cope, 1876 (nomen dubium)
- C. robustus Knight, 1898 - Late Jurassic (Kimmeridgian/Tithonian) of Wyoming, US (Morrison Formation)
- C. africanus Haug, 1905
- C. avus W. H. Ferguson 1906 - Early Cretaceous (Aptian) of Victoria, Australia (Wonthaggi Formation)
- C. humei Priem, 1914 - Late Cretaceous (Campanian) of Egypt (Mut Formation)
- C. elegans Vollrath, 1923
- C. frazieri Ostrom, 1970 - Early Cretaceous (Aptian/Albian) of Wyoming & Montana, US (Cloverly Formation), potentially Campanian of New Jersey, US (Mount Laurel Formation)
- C. gustasoni Kirkland, 1987 - Late Cretaceous (Cenomanian) of Utah, US (Naturita Formation)
- C. fossanovum Kirkland, 1998
- C. ibimiriensis - Late Jurassic (Tithonian) of Pernambuco, Brazil (Aliança Formation)
- C. stewarti Milner & Kirkland, 2006 - Early Jurassic (Hettangian to Sinemurian) of Utah, US (Moenave and Kayenta Formations)
- C. texanus Parris et al., 2011 - Aptian/Albian of Texas, US (Antlers and Twin Mountains Formations)
- C. carteri Main et al., 2014 - Cenomanian of Texas, US (Woodbine Formation)
- C. kranzi Frederickson et al., 2016 - Albian of Maryland, US (Arundel Formation)
- C. kirklandi Frederickson & Cifelli, 2016 - Early Cretaceous (Valanginian) of Utah, US (Cedar Mountain Formation)
- C. molossus Frederickson & Cifelli, 2016 - Cenomanian of Utah, US (Cedar Mountain Formation)
- C. kempae Frederickson & Cifelli, 2016 - Valanginian of Utah, US (Cedar Mountain Formation)
- C. nirumbee Frederickson & Cifelli, 2016 - Albian of Montana, US (Cloverly Formation)
- C. tunuensis Agnolin et al., 2018 - Late Triassic (Norian) of Greenland (Fleming Fjord Formation)
- C. guanganensis Wang et al., 2022 - Late Jurassic of China (Shaximiao Formation)
- C. shishkini Minikh, 2023 - Middle/Late Triassic (Ladinian/Carnian) of Orenburg, Russia

== Palaeoecology ==
Ceratodus likely fed on bivalves, as scarring on the shells of non-marine bivalves from a clay pit near Lipie Śląskie in southern Poland has been attributed to an unsuccessful predatory attack by Ceratodus.

== Gallery ==
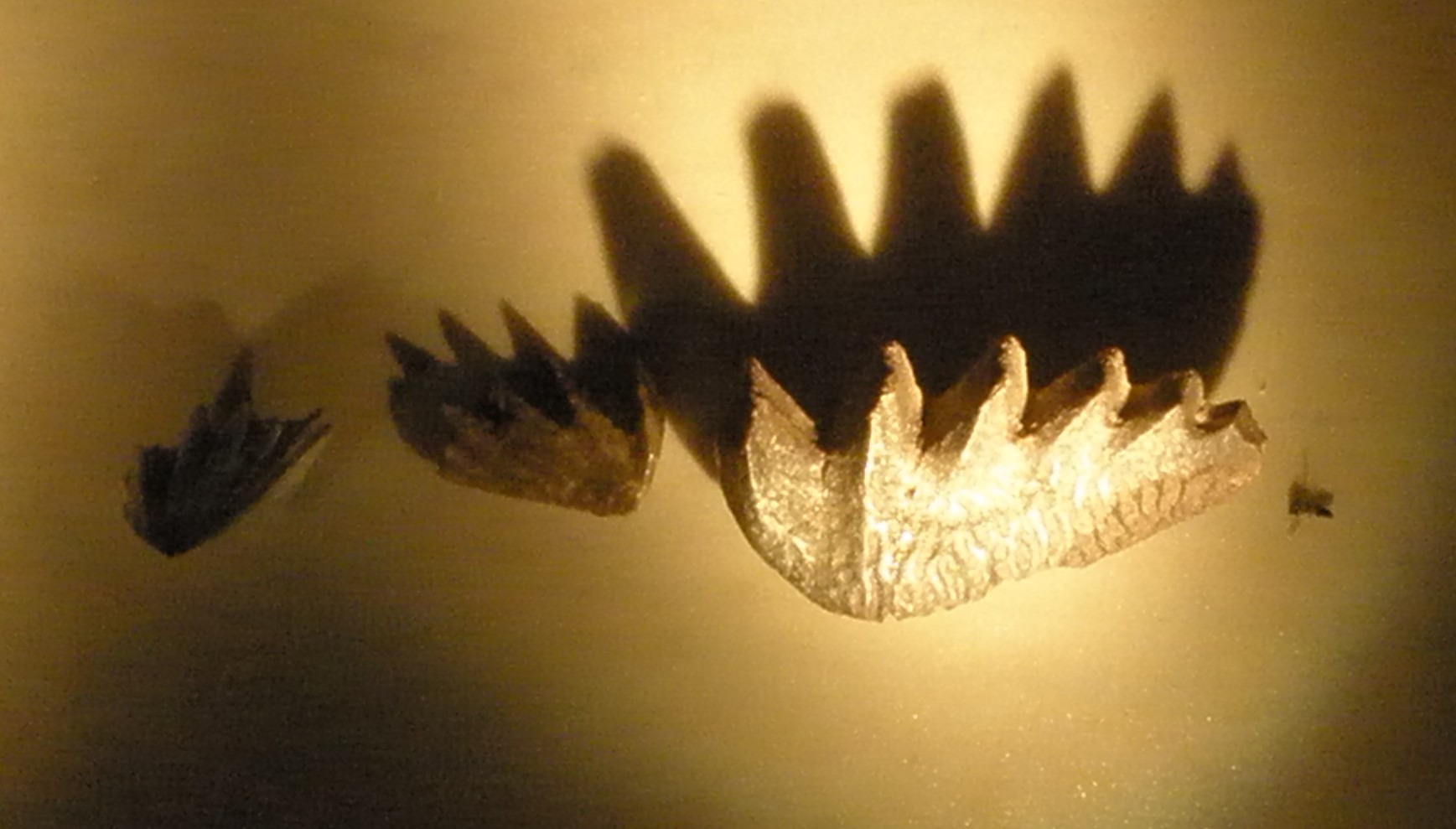
Ceratodus tooth plates

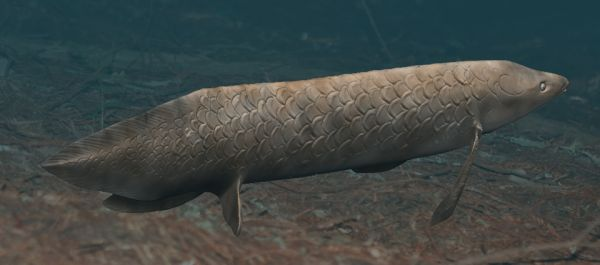
Ceratodus reconstruction
