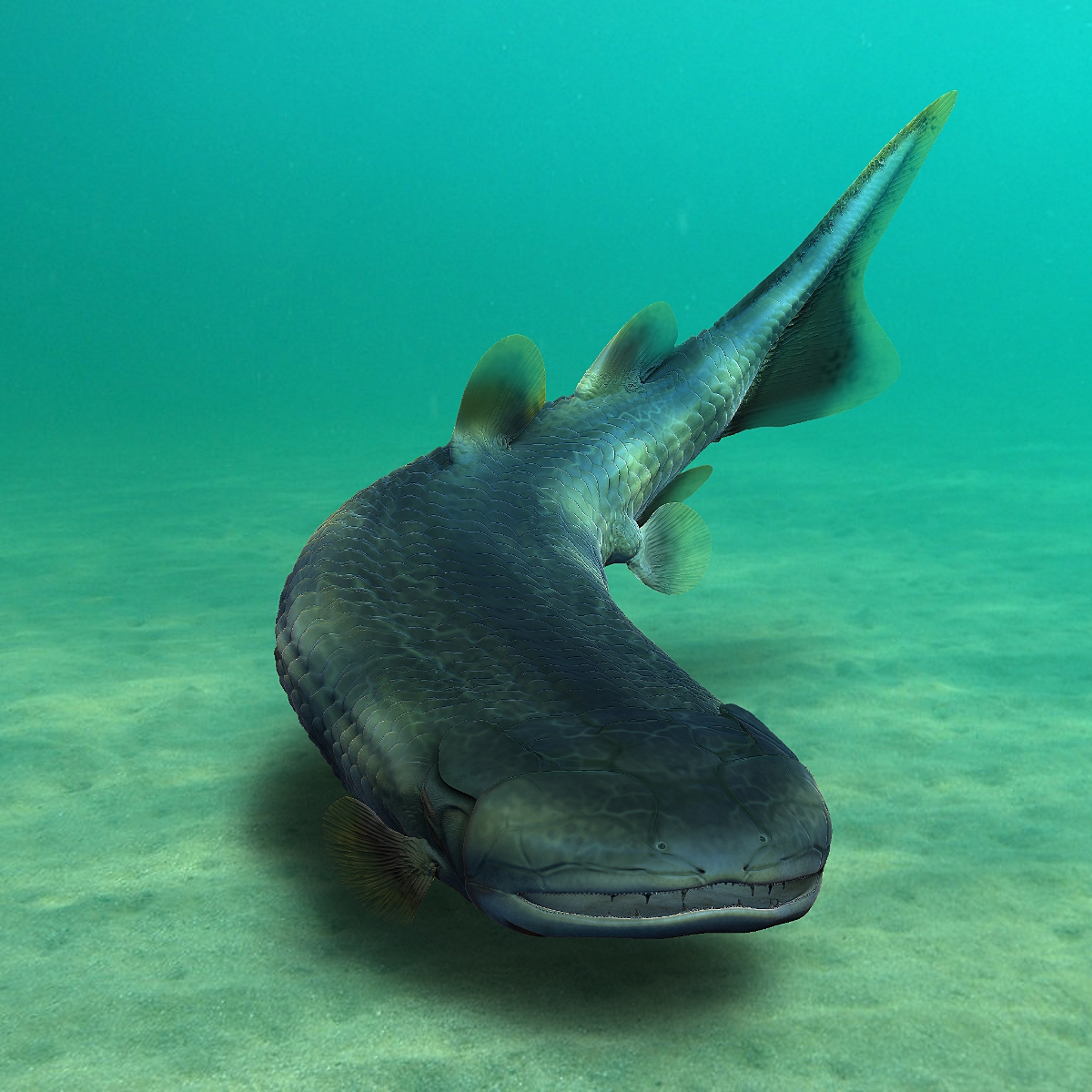
- Reconstruction of Laccognathus embryi

Scientific classification
- Kingdom: Animalia
- Phylum: Chordata
- Order: †Porolepiformes
- Family: †Holoptychiidae
- Genus: †Laccognathus
- Species: †L. embryi

Binomial name
- †Laccognathus embryi Downs et al., 2011
- Discovery site of Laccognathus embryi

= Laccognathus embryi =

Laccognathus embryi Temporal range: Frasnian (Late Devonian)

Extinct species of fish

Laccognathus embryi is an extinct species of porolepiform lobe-finned fish recovered from Ellesmere Island, Canada. It existed during the Frasnian age of the Late Devonian epoch (around 385.3 to 374.5 mya).

== Discovery ==
Specimens from at least 22 individuals of Laccognathus embryi were recovered from the Fram Formation of Ellesmere Island, Nunavut, Canada from 2000 to 2008 in the Nunavut Paleontological Expeditions. The expeditions were led by Jason P. Downs, Edward Daeschler, Farish Jenkins Jr., and Neil Shubin, and previously resulted in the discovery of the tetrapodomorph Tiktaalik roseae from the same locality.

Ellesmere Island was also the site of previous Norwegian scientific expeditions by the ship Fram in 1893-1896 by Fridtjof Nansen and in 1898–1902 by Otto Sverdrup. In the second expedition, a few vertebrate fossils were collected from Ellesmere Island by a member of Sverdrup's crew with the geologist Per Schei. The collection included a few porolepiform scales attributed to Glyptolepis and Holoptychius.

Prior to its discovery, the genus Laccognathus was known only from Latvia and Russia. L. embryi is the first member of the genus discovered in North America.

The fossil sarcopterygian fish Laccognathus embryi of the Devonian was named in honour of Geologist Ashton F. Embry.

== Description ==
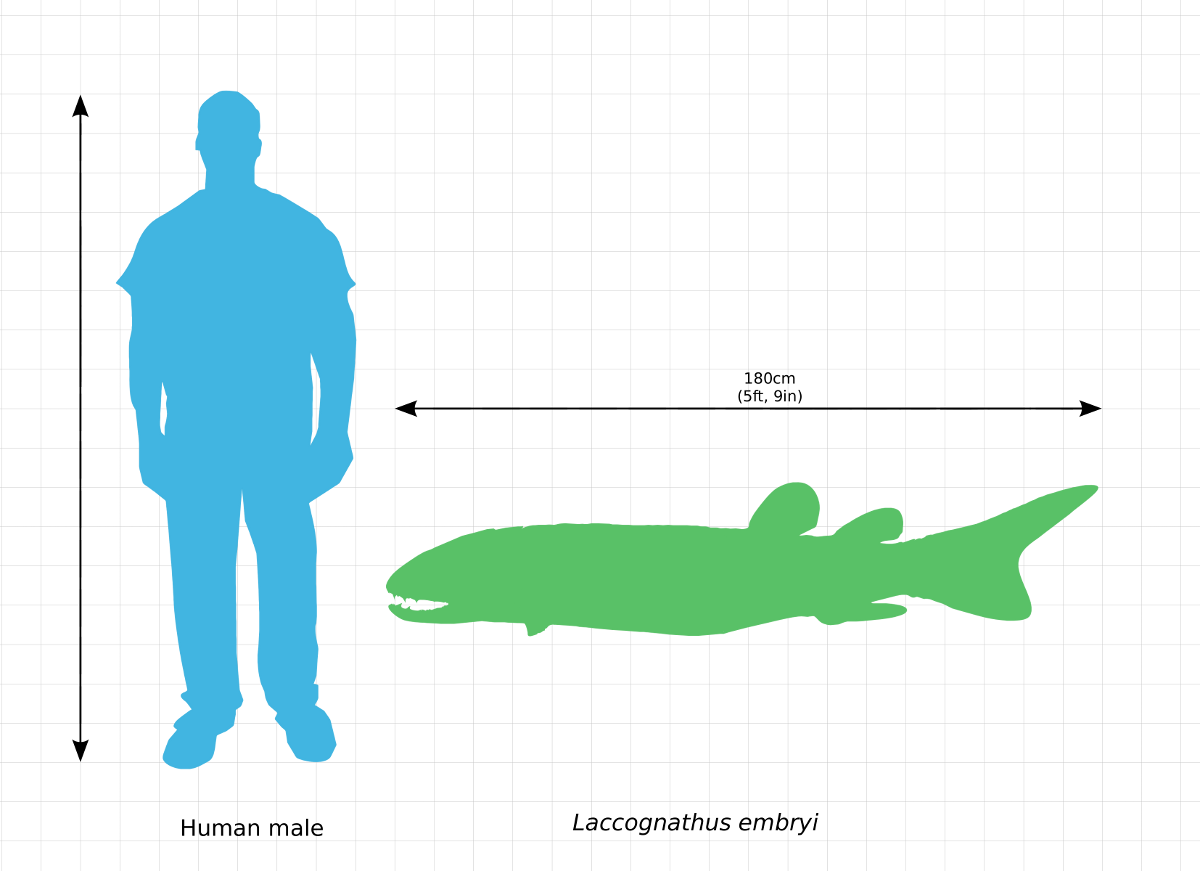
Comparison of an average adult human male, 170 cm (5.6 ft), with the approximate length of L. embryi, 1.8 m (6 ft).

Like other members of the genus, Laccognathus embryi possessed three deep longitudinal pits (fossae) on the external surface of the lower jaw. They are believed to have functioned as sensory pits able to detect changes in surrounding water pressure, similar to the lateral line of modern fishes and sharks, an analogous to our ears. It had a distinctly dorsoventrally flattened short and wide head, less than one-fifth of the length of the body and with a width-to-length ratio of approximately 2:1. The eyes were very small, even smaller than those of L. panderi. The jaws possessed coronoid fangs up to 3.8 cm (1.5 in) in length. These were bordered with marginal teeth, with the exception of coronoids 1 and 2. Much of the external surface of the lower jaw is oriented downwards, suggesting that the animal spent a considerable amount of time resting on the substrate.

L. embryi is estimated to have been 1.8 m (6 ft) long with a wide flattened body. Though only two partial specimens of the postcranial body have been recovered, L. embryi are believed to have the same body form as other species of Laccognathus. L. grossi, for example, had wide and relatively short pectoral and pelvic fins arising from fleshy lobes. The caudal (tail) fin was heterocercal, with a long low upper (epichordal) blade and a rounded lower (hypochordal) blade three times as wide as the upper blade. The dorsal and anal fins were positioned close to the caudal fin. The body was also covered in broadly overlapping thick scales, each roughly 2.5 cm (1 in) in diameter and ornamented at the exposed ends with small radially arranged tubercles, ridges, or both.

== Distribution and geologic time range ==
Laccognathus embryi was recovered in the middle part of the Fram Formation, designated as the NV2K17 locality. The formation, which consists of alternating layers of siltstone and sandstone, is dated to the Frasnian age of the Late Devonian epoch (around 385.3 ± 2.6 to 374.5 ± 2.6 mya). Specific palynological examination reveals that the NV2K17 locality itself is from the early to middle Frasnian. The area is believed to have been the floodplain of a meandering river system.

The variety of fossils found in Ellesmere Island is similar to those found in the Gauja Formations of Latvia and Estonia, from whence other species of Laccognathus were recovered. North America and western Eurasia were once part of the ancient supercontinent of Euramerica (also known as Laurussia) located at the equator during the Devonian period.

== Paleoecology ==
The flattened head of Laccognathus embryi indicates that it was a benthic sit-and-wait ambush predator. There are fossils of at least eight other vertebrate taxa found within the same fossiliferous zone as L. embryi, including Asterolepis, several large tetrapodomorphs, dipnoans, and another small undescribed holoptychiid. Though the locality in Ellesmere island is from freshwater siltstone alluvial deposits, the existence of other members of the genus in marine and estuarine deposits in Europe suggest that Laccognathus species could tolerate a wide range of environmental conditions and salinity levels.

== Taxonomy ==
Laccognathus embryi belongs to the genus Laccognathus, of the family Holoptychiidae. This family, in turn, belongs to the extinct order Porolepiformes, of the class Sarcopterygii (lobe-finned fishes). Together with their closest living relatives, subclass Dipnoi (lungfishes), Laccognathus are members of the clade Dipnomorpha. Unlike its sister group, the Tetrapodomorpha, dipnomorphs were not direct ancestors of land vertebrates.

The generic name Laccognathus is derived from Greek λάκκος (lakkos, 'pit') and γνάθος (gnathos, 'jaw') in reference to the three wide pits along the labial surface of the lower jaw. The specific name is in honour of Ashton Embry of the Geological Survey of Canada.

== See also ==
- Ashton F. Embry
- Panderichthys
- Sarcopterygii
- List of sarcopterygians
- List of prehistoric bony fish
