= Gauja (disambiguation) =

Gauja is a river in Latvia

Gauja may also refer to:

- Gauja River (Neman tributary), a river in Lithuania and Belarus
- SS Gauja, a Latvian cargo ship (1925-1941)
- Gauja Formation, a Middle Devonian fossil locality in Estonia and Latvia
- Gauja National Park, Latvia
- FK Gauja, a Latvian football club from Valmiera
- Gauja Station, a railway station in Latvia
