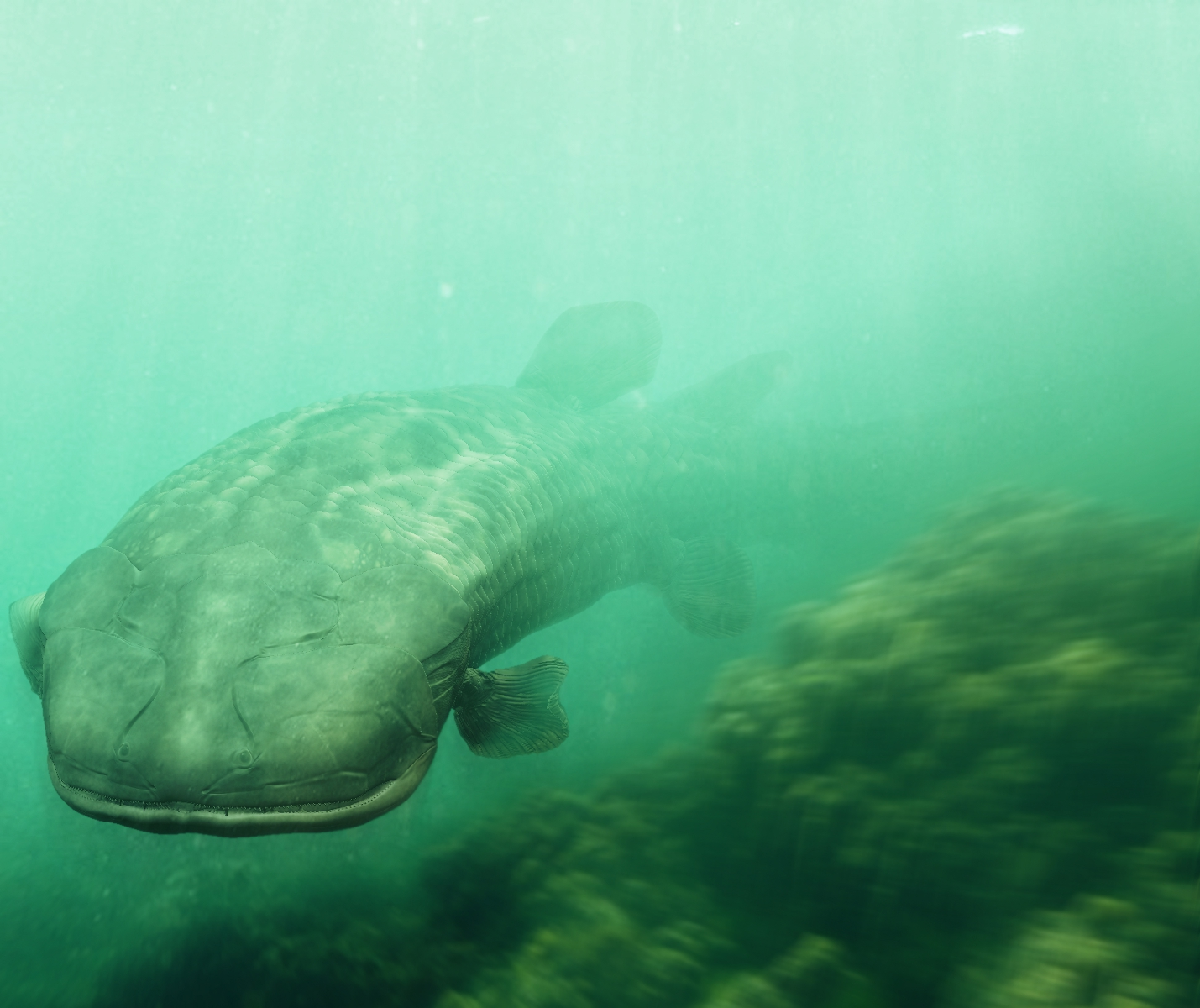
- Reconstruction of Laccognathus panderi

Scientific classification
- Kingdom: Animalia
- Phylum: Chordata
- Order: †Porolepiformes
- Family: †Holoptychiidae
- Genus: †Laccognathus; Gross, 1941

Type species
- †Laccognathus panderi Gross, 1941

Species
- See text.

= Laccognathus =

Laccognathus Temporal range: Middle to Late Devonian

Extinct genus of bony fishes

Laccognathus is an extinct genus of amphibious lobe-finned fish from Europe and North America. They existed from the Middle Devonian to the Late Devonian (around 397.5 to 360 mya). The name comes from Greek for 'pitted jaw'.

== Description ==
Species of Laccognathus were characterized by the presence of three large pits (fossae) on the external surface of the lower jaw, which may have had sensory functions. It is the origin of the genus name, from Greek λάκκος ('pit') and γνάθος ('jaw'). Laccognathus grew to approximately 1–2 metres (3.3–6.6 ft) in length. They had very short dorsoventrally flattened heads, less than one-fifth the length of the body. Like other sarcopterygians, their fins arise from pairs of fleshy lobes.

The skeleton of Laccognathus was structured such that large areas of the skin were stretched out over solid plates of bone. This bone was composed of particularly dense fibers—so dense that cutaneous respiration (exchange of oxygen through the skin) was not a likely trait exhibited by Laccognathus. Rather, the dense ossifications may have served to retain water inside the body as Laccognathus traveled on land between bodies of water.

== Taxonomy ==
Laccognathus are classified under the family Holoptychiidae in the extinct order Porolepiformes. They are not direct ancestors of tetrapods like the clade Tetrapodomorpha, but instead belong to the clade Dipnomorpha. Their closest living relatives are the members of the subclass Dipnoi (lungfish).

== Species ==
The following are the species classified under Laccognathus. A fourth undescribed species recovered from the Middle Devonian of Latvia may exist.

- †Laccognathus panderi Gross, 1941

Recovered from the Middle Devonian and Late Devonian formations of various parts of eastern Europe.

- †Laccognathus grossi Vorobyeva, 2006

Recovered from the Middle Devonian Gauja Formation of Latvia.

- †Laccognathus embryi Downs et al., 2011

Recovered from Late Devonian Fram Formation of Ellesmere Island, Canada, the same locality from which Tiktaalik was found.

== See also ==
- Holoptychius
- Sarcopterygii
- List of sarcopterygians
- List of prehistoric bony fish
