= Glyptolepis =

Glytpolepis is the scientific name of two genera of organisms and may refer to:

- Glyptolepis (fish) - an extinct genus of porolepiform lobe-finned fish from the Middle to Late Devonian
- Glyptolepis (plant) - a morphogenus for ovulate conifer cones from the Late Triassic
