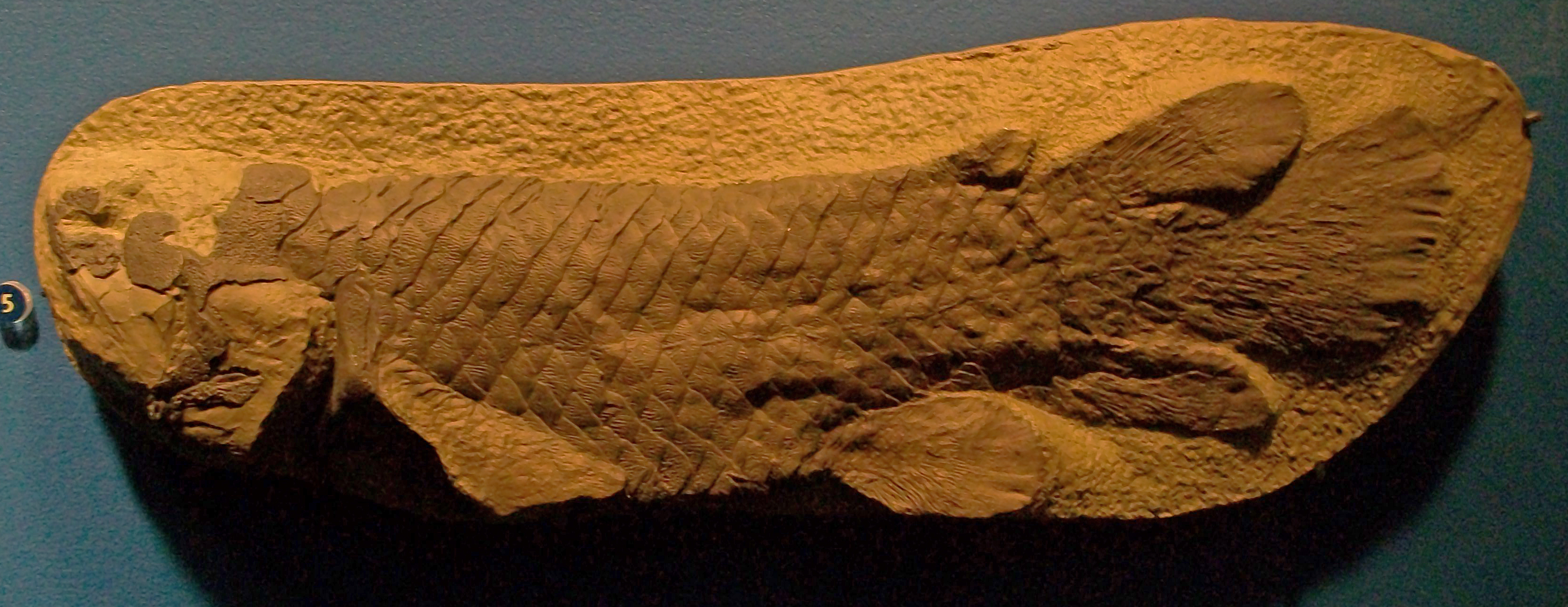
- Fossil of H. jarviki in the Field Museum of Natural History, Chicago

Scientific classification
- Kingdom: Animalia
- Phylum: Chordata
- Order: †Porolepiformes
- Family: †Holoptychiidae
- Genus: †Holoptychius; Agassiz, 1839

Type species
- †Holoptychius nobilissimus Agassiz, 1839

Species
- H. bergmanni Downs et al, 2013; H. flemingi Agassiz, 1845; H. jarviki Cloutier & Schultze, 1996; H. nobilissimus Agassiz, 1839

= Holoptychius =

Holoptychius Temporal range: Late Devonian (Frasnian to Famennian) ~383–365 Ma

Extinct genus of bony fishes

Holoptychius (from Greek: όλος holos, 'whole' and Greek: πτυχή ptyche 'fold') is an extinct genus of marine & freshwater porolepiform lobe-finned fish from the Late Devonian period. It is known from fossils worldwide, from North America, South America, and much of Europe. The genus was first described by Louis Agassiz in 1839.

== Description ==
Holoptychius was a streamlined predator about 50 centimetres (20 in) long (though largest specimen could grow up to 2.5 metres (8.2 ft)), which fed on other bony fish. Its rounded scales and body form indicate that it could have swum quickly through the water to catch prey. Similar to other rhipidistians, it had fang-like teeth on its palate in addition to smaller teeth on the jaws. Its asymmetrical tail sported a caudal fin on its lower end. To compensate for the downward push caused by this fin placement, the pectoral fins of Holoptychius were placed high on the body.

It was likely an ambush predator with a similar lifestyle to the modern arapaima. It had a distinct layer of hard but flexible scales that may have helped to fend off attacks from other predatory lobe-finned fish.

== Species ==
A number of Holoptychius species have been described, the majority being dubious species known only from isolated scales. Only the following valid species are known by diagnostic remains:

- H. bergmanni Downs, Daeschler, Jenkins & Shubin, 2013 - Frasnian of Ellesmere Island, Arctic Canada (Fram Formation)
- H. flemingi Agassiz, 1844 - Famennian of Scotland (Glenvale Sandstone) & Belgium (Evieux Formation)
- H. jarviki Cloutier & Schultze, 1996 - Frasnian of Quebec, Canada (Escuminac Formation)
- H. nobilissimus Agassiz, 1839 (type species) - Late Frasnian to early Famennian of Scotland & England (Old Red Sandstone), potentially Latvia (Ketleri Formation), Norway & Oryol Oblast in Russia (Turgenevo Formation)

In past sources, H. jarviki was frequently referred to as H. quebecensis, due to its material being conflated with that of Quebecius quebecensis, necessitating its description as a distinct species in 1996. The genus Glytolepis was also previously treated as a subgenus of Holoptychius.

The following dubious and undescribed species are known:

- H. americanus Leidy, 1856 - Late Devonian of Pennsylvania, US (Catskill Formation)
- H. halli Newberry, 1889 - Late Devonian of New York, US (Catskill Formation)
- H. giganteus Agassiz, 1845 - Devonian of Scotland, Belgium, and Russia
- H. sp. indet. from the Kennebecasis Formation of New Brunswick, Canada.
- H. sp. indet. from the Cuche Formation of Colombia, known from an isolated tooth (UN-DG-PALV86) and preserved scales (UN-DG-PALV50-51).

== Distribution ==
Fossils of Holoptychius have been found in the Devonian of Belgium, Colombia (Boyacá), Norway, Canada (Quebec & New Brunswick), the Russian Federation (Oryol), Greenland, and the United States (New York & Pennsylvania).

== Palaeoecology ==
Isotopic analysis of Holoptychius remains from Greenland reveals that it was likely a euryhaline organism.

== Gallery ==
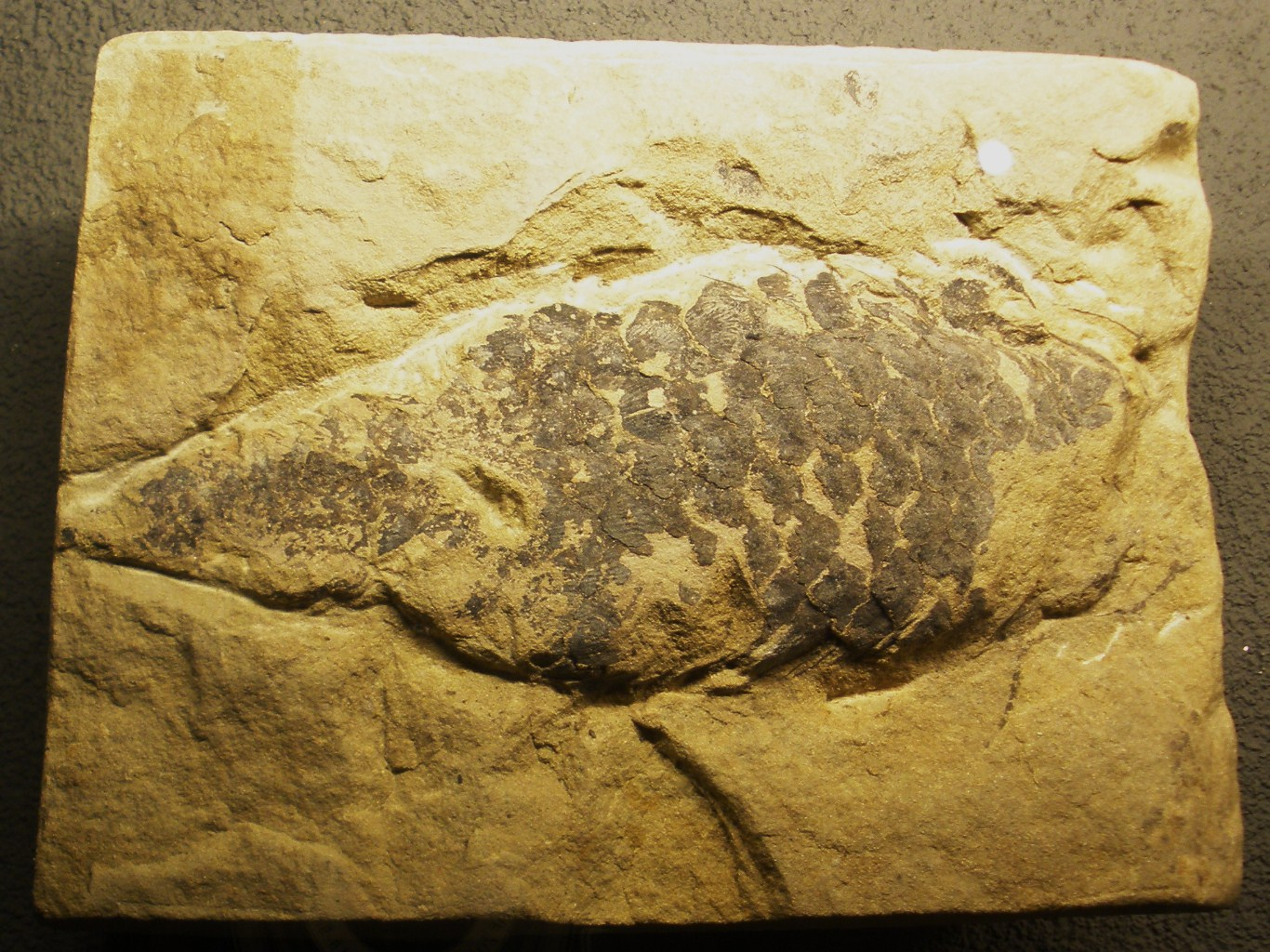
H. flemingi

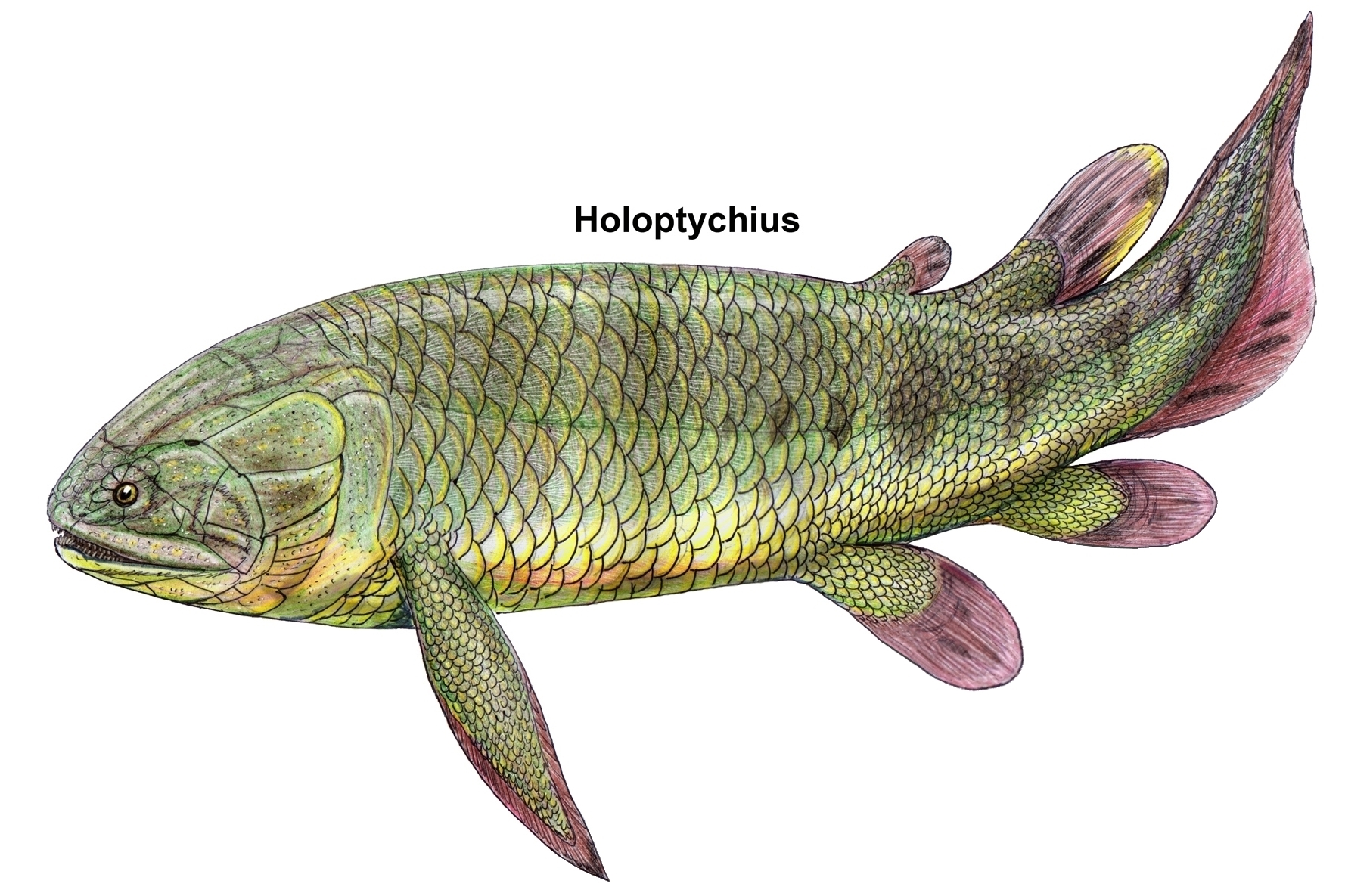
Life restoration of Holoptychius sp.

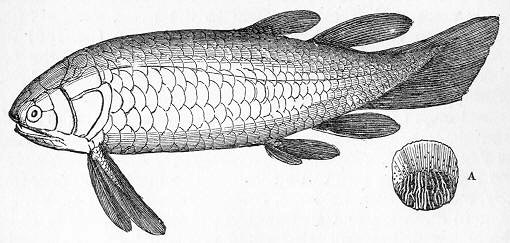
H. nobilissimus and scale
