= Gauja Valley =

Valley in Latvia

Coordinates: 57°11′N 24°53′E

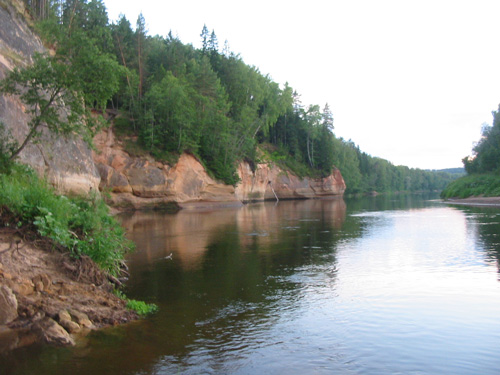
Sandstone cliffs in the Gauja Valley near Cēsis

The Gauja Valley (Latvian: Gaujas senleja) is a valley of the Gauja River in Latvia, which is 1 to 2.5 km wide, and the maximum depth near Sigulda is 85 m. The valley is the main element of Gauja National Park, established in 1973.

The valley started forming approximately one million years ago in the Quaternary glaciation period. The final formation of the valley occurred during the last period of glacial activity, 10,000 to 20,000 years ago. The glaciers melted and covered what is now Latvia several times, and the melting waters settled in the terraces of the valley and transported field stones, gravel, and clay.

Geographically, the Gauja Valley played a role during the Livonian Crusades due to its network of waterways and land roads (Latin: Via magna of Livonia). The valley was also home to a variety of ethnic groups that each controlled their own lands (Livonians, Ydumea people, Letts, and Vends). During the 13th century, several new stone castles of the Livonian Order (Sigulda Castle, Cēsis Castle, and Valmiera Castle) and the Archbishop of Riga's Turaida Castle were built here.

== See also ==
- Gauja Formation
