= Laccognathus grossi =

Laccognathus grossi Temporal range: Givetian (Middle Devonian)

Scientific classification
- Domain: Eukaryota
- Kingdom: Animalia
- Phylum: Chordata
- Clade: Sarcopterygii
- Class: †Porolepimorpha
- Order: †Porolepiformes
- Family: †Holoptychiidae
- Genus: †Laccognathus
- Species: †L. grossi

Binomial name
- †Laccognathus grossi Vorobyeva, 2006

Extinct species of fish

Laccognathus grossi is an extinct lobe-finned fish from eastern Europe. They existed during the Middle Devonian. The species is named after Walter Gross, who collected the first Laccognathus fossils belonging to L. panderi.

L. grossi was first recovered from the Middle Devonian Lode Formation of Latvia by Emiliya Ivanovna Vorobyeva, who described it as a specimen of the known species L. panderi. Upon closer examination in 2005, she redescribed the specimen (as well as the genus) under the new name L. grossi.

== See also ==
- Sarcopterygii
- List of sarcopterygians
- List of prehistoric bony fish
