= Ventalepis =

Scientific classification
- Kingdom: Animalia
- Phylum: Chordata
- Order: Porolepiformes
- Genus: †Ventalepis; Schultze, 1980

Extinct genus of bony fishes

Ventalepis is an extinct genus of prehistoric sarcopterygians or lobe-finned fish.

== See also ==
- Sarcopterygii
- List of sarcopterygians
- List of prehistoric bony fish
