= Fram Formation =

Geologic formation in Nunavut, Canada

- Stratigraphic range: Upper Devonian (Frasnian)
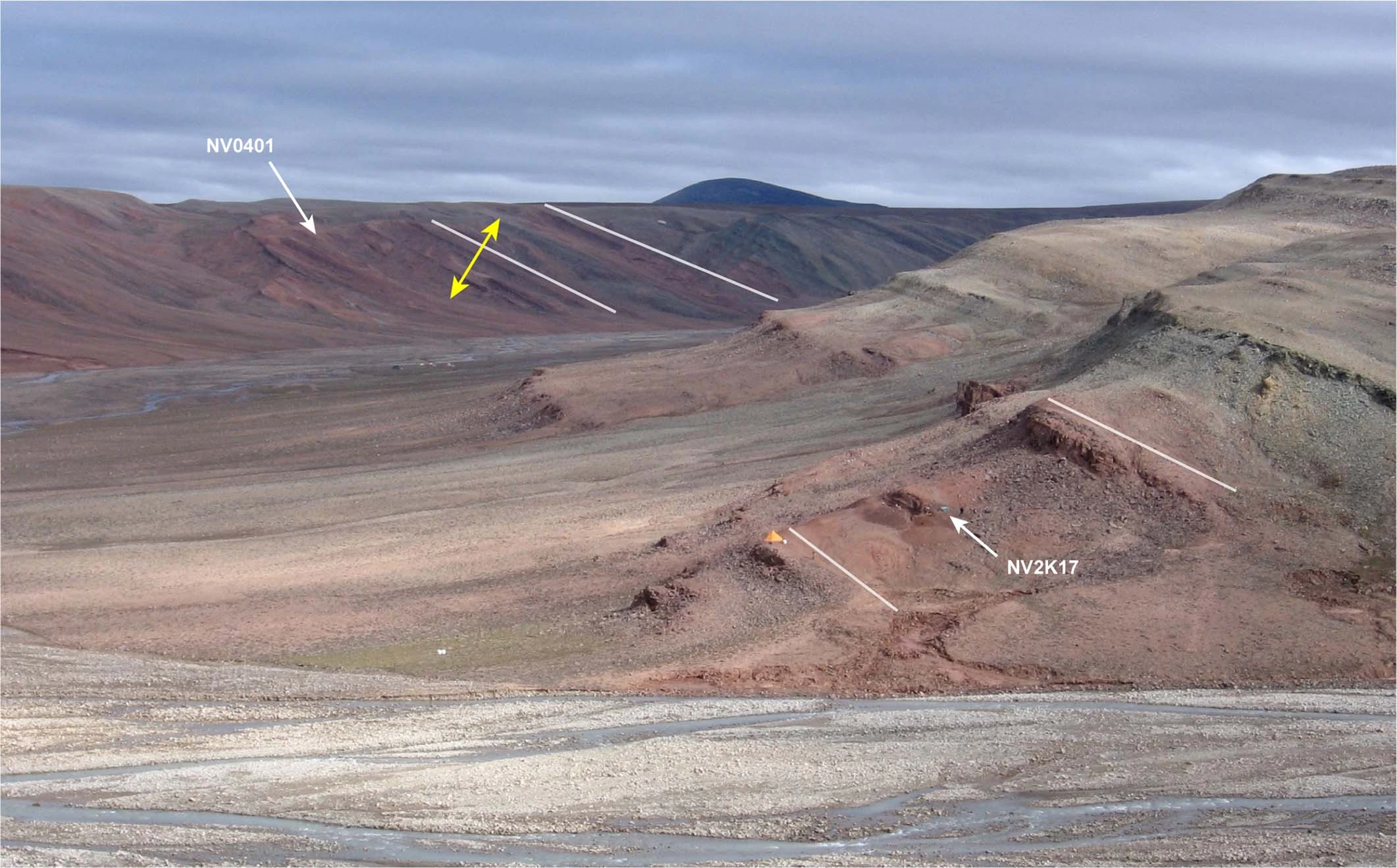
- Photograph of rocks of the Fram Formation, indicating where the Qikiqtania (NV0401) and Tiktaalik (NV2K17) specimens have been found
- Type: Geological formation
- Unit of: Okse Bay Group
- Underlies: Hell Gate Formation
- Overlies: Hecla Bay Formation
- Thickness: 10 to 20 meters

Lithology
- Primary: Siltstone
- Other: Sandstone

Location
- Coordinates: 77.164917, -86.269283
- Region: Nunavut
- Country: Canada
- Extent: Ellesmere Island
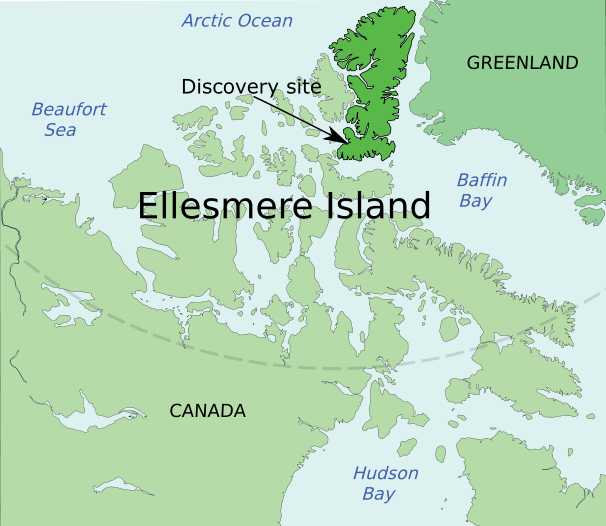
- The discovery site of Tiktaalik and Laccognathus embryi fossils in the Fram Formation on Ellesmere Island.

The Fram Formation is an Upper Devonian (Frasnian) sequence of rock strata on Ellesmere Island that came into prominence in 2006 with the discovery in its rocks of examples of the transitional fossil, Tiktaalik, a sarcopterygian or lobe-finned fish showing many tetrapod characteristics. Fossils of Laccognathus embryi, a porolepiform lobe-finned fish, and Qikiqtania, a close relative of Tiktaalik, were also found in the formation. The Fram Formation is a Middle to Upper Devonian clastic wedge forming an extensive continental facies consisting of sediments derived from deposits laid down in braided stream systems that formed some 375 million years ago, at a time when the North American craton ("Laurentia") was straddling the equator.

== Paleobiota ==
=== Vertebrates ===
Genus	Species	Location	Material	Notes	Images
Asterolepidoidei	Indeterminate	NV0207 locality, near the mouth of Vendom Fiord.		A placoderm.	
Asterolepis	A. alticristata	NV2K17 locality.	Numerous specimens.	A placoderm.	
Asterolepis	A. cf. radiata	NV2K17 locality.	Multiple plates.	A placoderm.	
Asterolepis	A. sp. indet.	Locality NV0205.	Anterior median dorsal plate (NUFV 1287).	A placoderm.	
Bothriolepididae	Sp. indet.	NV0402, NV2K15, NV2K05, NV2K01 & NV2K07 localities.	Partial cephalic skeleton (NUFV 1292) & several plates.	A placoderm.	
Bothriolepis	B. sp. indet.	NV2K17 & NV0402 localities.	Anterior median dorsal plate (NUFV 847), visceral impressions of a partial thoracic skeleton (NUFV 1294) and of a posterior median dorsal plate (NUFV 1293).	A placoderm.	
Eusthenopteron	E. jenkinsi	NV2K17 locality.		A tristichopterid.	
Holoptychius	H. bergmanni	NV2K17 locality (77º09.895’N, 86º16.157’W) near the eastern arm of Bird Fiord.		A holoptychiid.	
Laccognathus	L. embryi		Specimens from at least 22 individuals known.	A holoptychiid.	
Qikiqtania	Q. wakei	Site NV0401 (77° 10.235′ N, 86° 11.279′ W)	Specimen preserving the "lower jaws, partial left upper jaw and palate in articulation, gulars, ceratohyals, an articulated left pectoral fin and articulated scales from the dorsal midline, flank and lateral line series"	An elpistostegalian.	
Tiktaalik	T. roseae	Site NV2K17, southern Ellesmere Island	"Based on a suite of specimens (NUFV 108–135) from a single locality (NV2K17). Three specimens (NUFV 108–110) preserve skulls, pectoral girdles and fins in articulation."	A stegocephalian.	

== See also ==
- List of fossiliferous stratigraphic units in Nunavut
- Escuminac Formation, another Frasnian-aged formation known for its sarcopterygian fossils.
