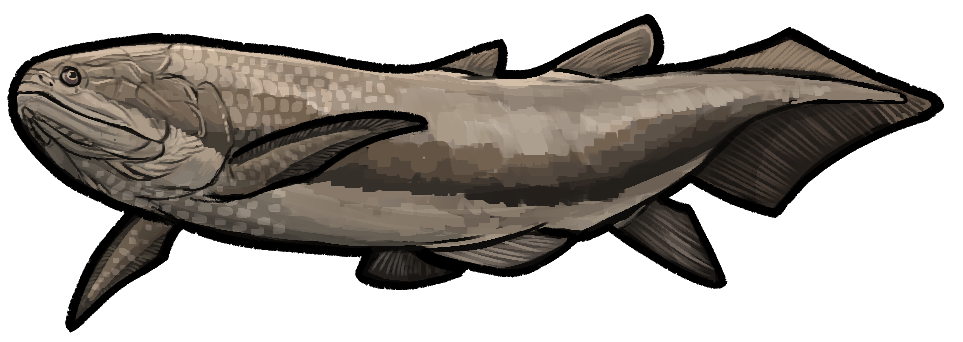
- Restoration of Quebecius quebecensis

Scientific classification
- Kingdom: Animalia
- Phylum: Chordata
- Order: †Porolepiformes
- Genus: †Quebecius; Schultze & Arsenault, 1987
- Species: †Q. quebecensis

Binomial name
- †Quebecius quebecensis (Whiteaves, 1889)

= Quebecius =

Quebecius Temporal range: Late Devonian

Extinct genus of bony fishes

Quebecius is an extinct genus of porolepiform sarcopterygian fish which lived during the Late Devonian period of Quebec, Canada. It is related to Glyptolepis, although distinguished from the latter by an especially broad pelvic fin base: uniquely among lobe-finned fish, only the pectoral fins are lobed. Specimens have been found to measure between 5 and 60 centimeters long.
