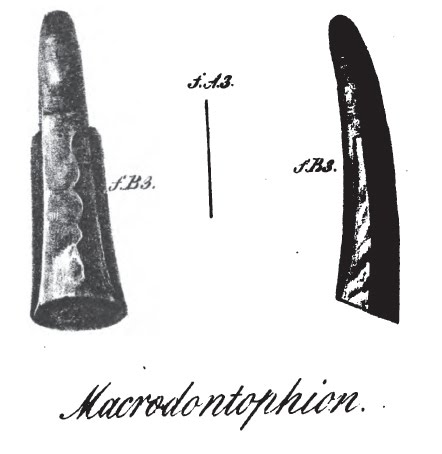
- Holotype shell in two views (after Zborzewski, 1834)

Scientific classification
- Kingdom: Animalia
- Superphylum: Lophotrochozoa
- Genus: †Macrodontophion; Zborzewsky, 1834

= Macrodontophion =

Macrodontophion Temporal range: Early Devonian 409.1–402.5 Ma

Dubious genus of reptiles

Macrodontophion (meaning "long-toothed snake") is the name given to a dubious genus of lophotrochozoan from the Early Devonian Dniester Series of Podolia, Ukraine. It was described by Adalbert Zborzewsky in 1834, but was never given a species epithet, and is considered a nomen dubium, because it is based only on fragments, such as the holotype, a shell of 25 millimetres (0.98 in).

The known specimens of Macrodontophion are presumed lost. Several of the specimens Zborzewski described are listed as being in his private collection, while others were said to be held by his colleagues.

== Taxonomy ==
Macrodontophion was originally believed to have been a snake tooth that belonged to an animal similar to Ophisaurus, or the cephalopod Beloptera, by Zborzewsky in 1834. Since Megalosaurus was mentioned in the same paragraph that the genus name Macrodontophion first appears, many palaeontologists, such as Romer in 1956, Steel in 1970 and Romer again in 1976, believed that Macrodontophion was a megalosaur. According to Weishampel (1990), Macrodontophion is a basal theropod. Zborzewsky (1834) tentatively referred Macrodontophion to the Jurassic, while Molnar (1990) described its age as Late Jurassic or Cretaceous. Lev Nessov suggested the age of the tooth was Early Devonian, belonging to the Dniester Series, of which is rich in Porolepis teeth, but this could not be completely confirmed at the time. Olshevsky (2000) noted that the holotype tooth of Macrodontophion is similar to those of a crocodile or a plesiosaur. Dumbrava and Blieck (2005) and Voichyshyn (2006) confidently referred Macrodontophion to the Early Devonian Dneister Series; they also confirmed that it was a lophotrochozoan.
