= Pseudosauripterus =

Scientific classification
- Domain: Eukaryota
- Kingdom: Animalia
- Phylum: Chordata
- Clade: Sarcopterygii
- Class: †Porolepimorpha
- Order: †Porolepiformes
- Genus: †Pseudosauripterus; White, 1961

Extinct genus of fishes

Pseudosauripterus is an extinct genus of prehistoric sarcopterygians or lobe-finned fish.

== See also ==
- Sarcopterygii
- List of sarcopterygians
- List of prehistoric bony fish
