= Hamodus =

Hamodus Temporal range: Middle Devonian (late Eifelian to late Givetian)

Scientific classification
- Kingdom: Animalia
- Phylum: Chordata
- Order: †Porolepiformes
- Family: †Holoptychiidae
- Genus: †Hamodus; Obruchev, 1933
- Species: †H. lutkevitshi

Binomial name
- †Hamodus lutkevitshi Obruchev, 1933

Extinct genus of fishes

Hamodus is an extinct genus of prehistoric freshwater lobe-finned fish from the Middle Devonian of eastern Europe. It contains a single known species, H. lutkevitshi from the Givetian of Pskov Oblast (Russia), Latvia, Estonia (Burtnieki Formation) and Lithuania. Remains are also known from the Eifelian of Severnaya Zemlya Island in Russia.

== See also ==
- Sarcopterygii
- List of sarcopterygians
- List of prehistoric bony fish
