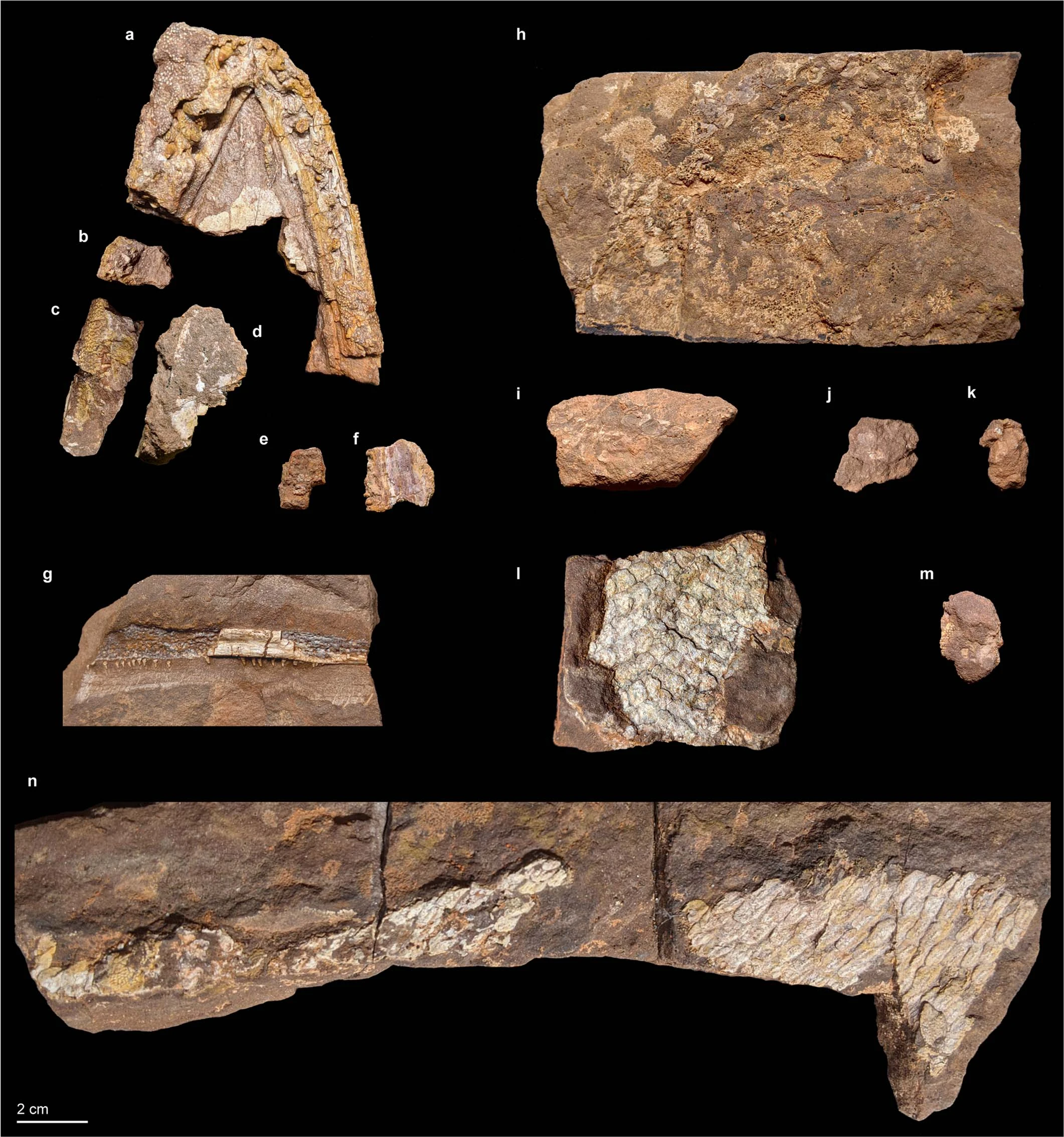
- Various fossil material of the holotype

Scientific classification
- Kingdom: Animalia
- Phylum: Chordata
- Clade: Eotetrapodiformes
- Clade: Elpistostegalia
- Genus: †Qikiqtania; Stewart et al., 2022
- Species: †Q. wakei

Binomial name
- †Qikiqtania wakei Stewart et al., 2022

= Qikiqtania =

Qikiqtania Temporal range: Late Devonian (Frasnian stage), 375 Ma

Extinct genus of tetrapodomorphs

Qikiqtania (/kɪkɪkˈtɑːnɪə/ kick-ick-TAN-ia) is an extinct genus of elpistostegalian tetrapodomorph from the Late Devonian (early Frasnian stage) Fram Formation of Nunavut, Canada. The genus contains a single species, Q. wakei, known from a partial skeleton. Analysis of the fin bones suggests that Qikiqtania was well-suited to swimming, and likely incapable of walking or supporting itself out of the water, as has been suggested for the closely related Tiktaalik.

== Discovery and naming ==
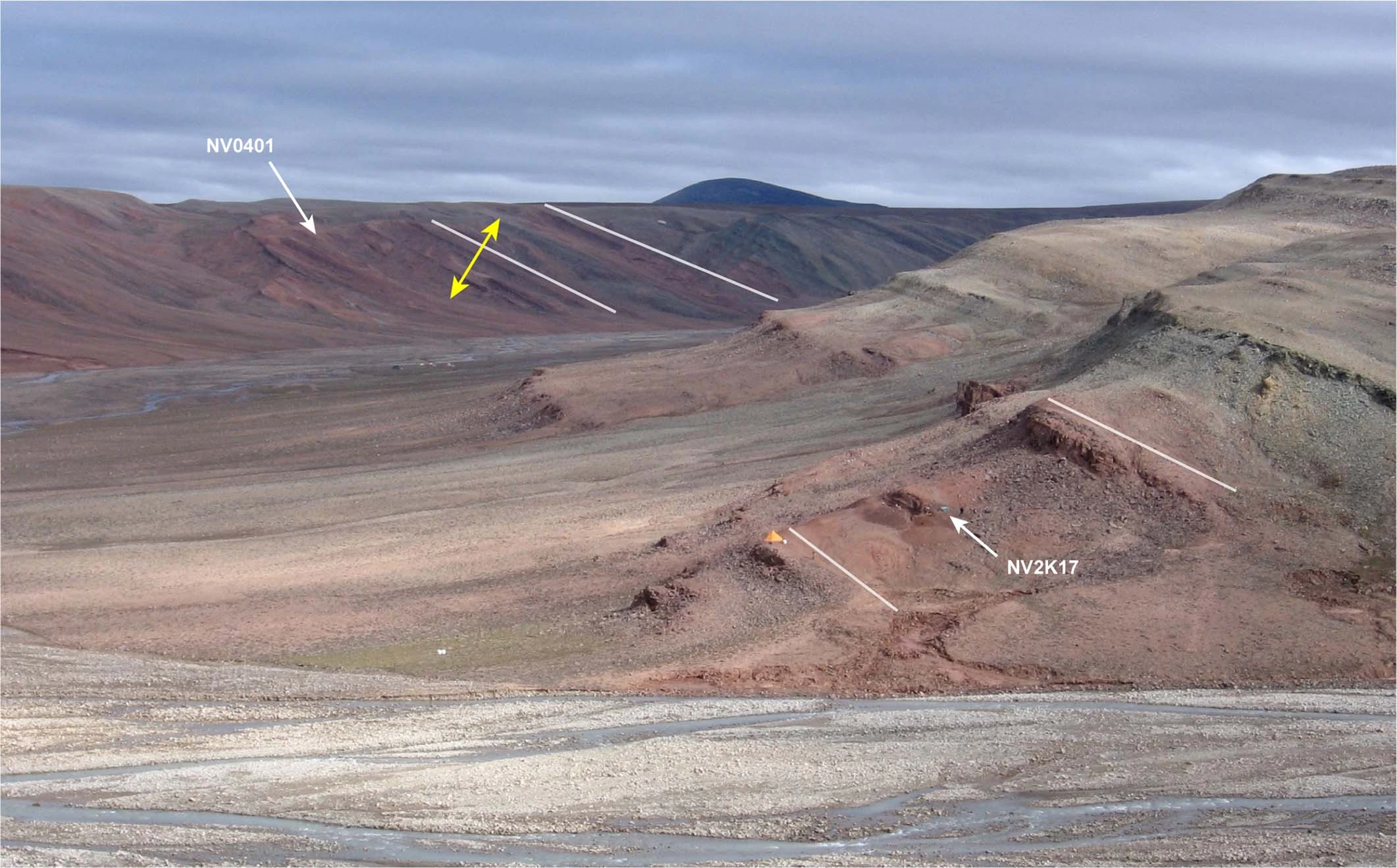
Photograph of rocks of the Fram Formation, indicating where the Qikiqtania (NV0401) and Tiktaalik (NV2K17) specimens have been found

Qikiqtania type locality on Ellesmere Island, Nunavut, Canada

The holotype specimen of Qikiqtania, NUFV 137, was discovered in 2004 in layers of the late Devonian (Frasnian)-dated Fram Formation of southern Ellesmere Island, Nunavut, Canada. The holotype specimen consists of lower jaws, partial left upper jaw and palate, gulars, ceratohyals, an articulated left pectoral fin and various articulated scales. The fossil remains of Qikiqtania were discovered 1.5 km (0.93 mi) east of the site where Tiktaalik was discovered, but from a slightly lower horizon in the formation.

In 2022, Thomas A. Stewart, Justin B. Lemberg, Ailis Daly, Edward B. Daeschler, and Neil H. Shubin named and described Qikiqtania wakei based on these remains. The generic name, "Qikiqtania," is derived from the Inuktitut words "Qikiqtaaluk" and "Qikiqtani", which represent the traditional names for the fossil site. The specific name, "wakei," honors the evolutionary biologist David Wake.

== Description ==
Qikiqtania had strong jaws that would have allowed it to securely bite and hold prey. It had a row of teeth and fangs inside its mouth, and it would have drawn food into its mouth using suction.

CT scans of the rock containing the fin revealed a complete limb inside. These scans allowed the describing authors to better understand and interpret the fossil material. The fin bones of Qikiqtania were not sturdy enough to support its body on land, so it would have lived entirely in the water. Its humerus does not show any indication of the well-developed muscle-attachment points seen in related semi-subaerial taxa. This is in contrast to Tiktaalik, which would have been able to prop itself up in shallow water or on land and use its limbs for support.

The preserved scales are rhomboid in shape, generally similar to those of other finned elpistostegalians. Preserved scales have been found from the trunk, including the dorsal midline and flank, the pectoral fin, and the lateral line series. Analysis of the scales revealed sensory canals that would have permitted the animal to detect the flow of water around its body.

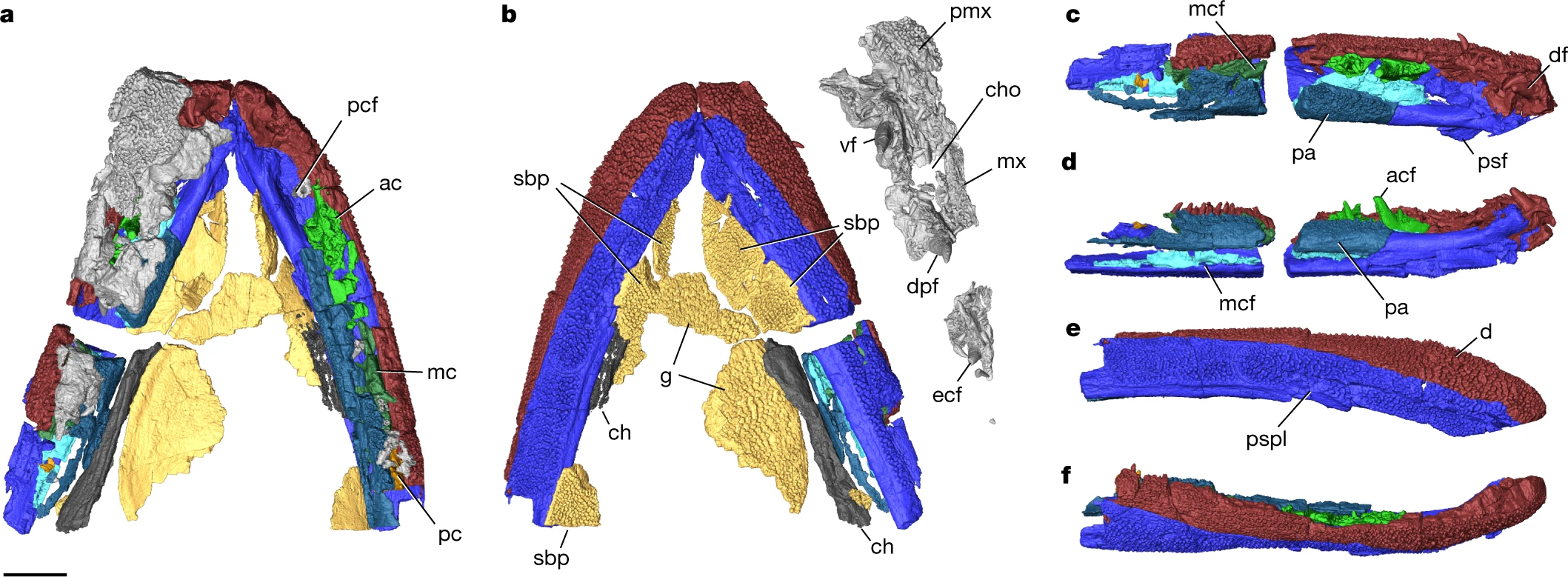
CT scans of the lower jaw

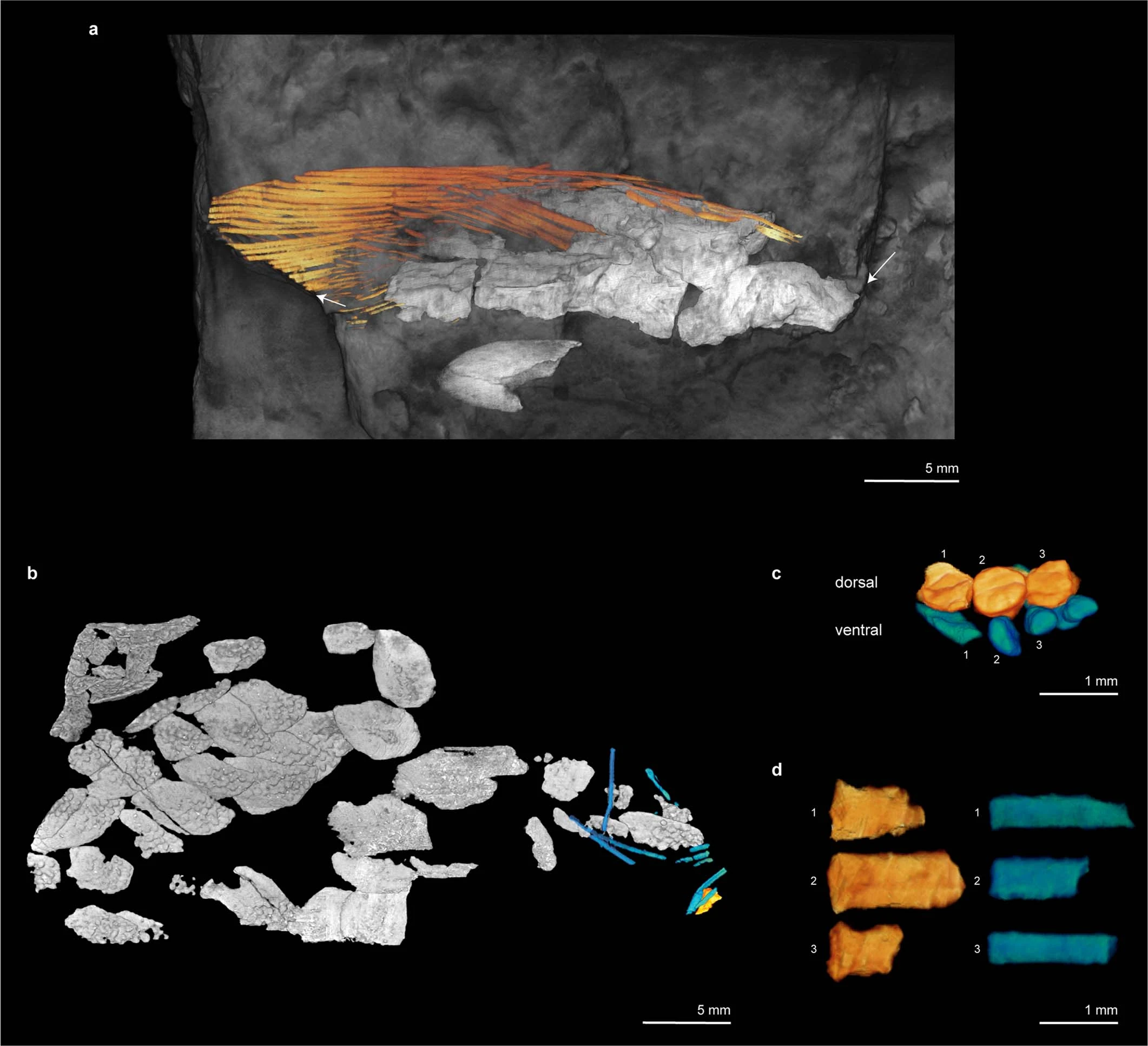
Pectoral fin

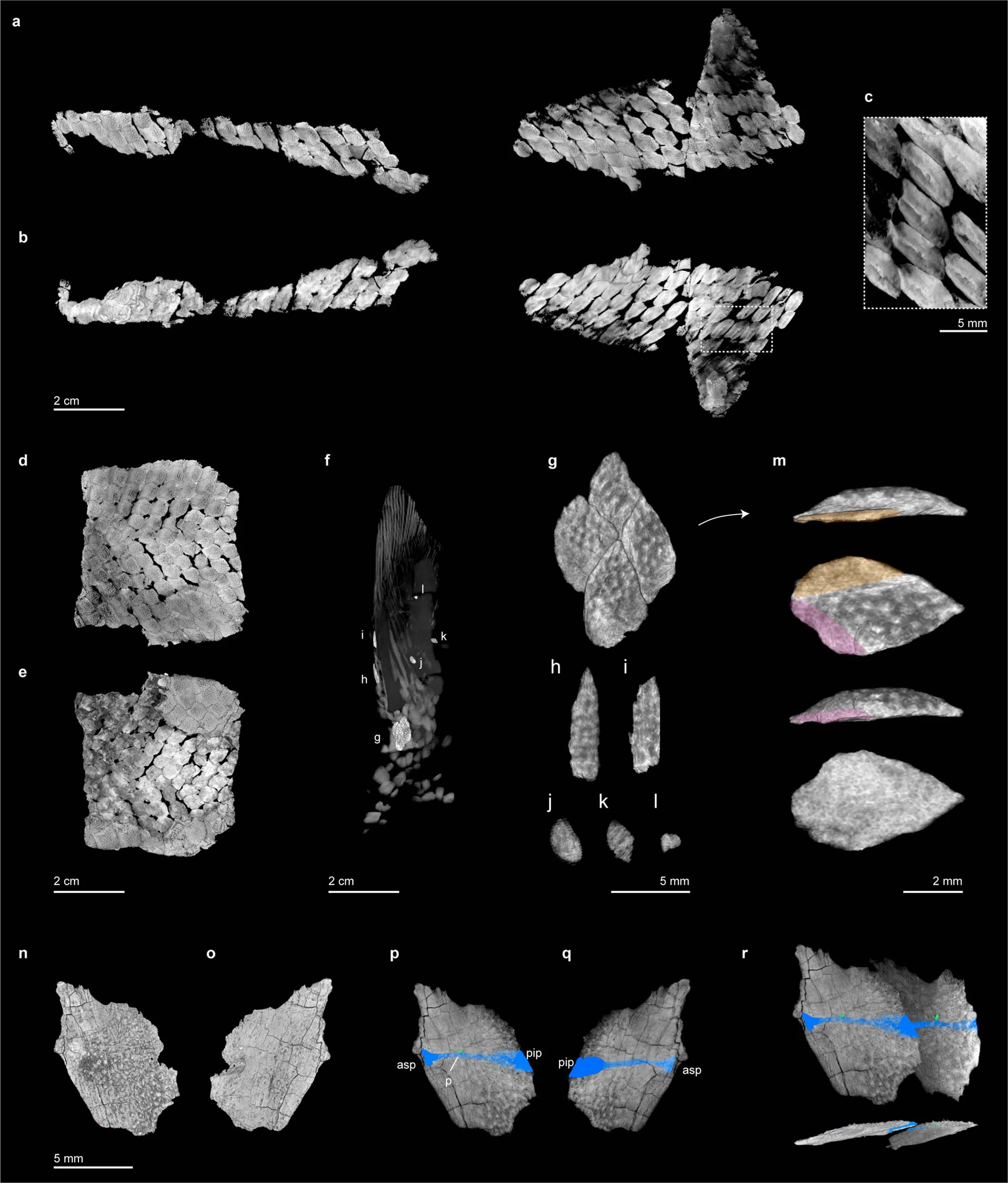
Various preserved scales

The holotype individual would have had a total body length of around 75 cm (30 in), which is smaller than most elpistostegalians.

Size of Qikiqtania compared to a human hand

== Classification ==
Qikiqtania represents an elpistostegalian closely related to limbed tetrapods. In all phylogenetic analyses, it was recovered as crownward to Panderichthys. The cladogram below displays the results of the phylogenetic analyses by Stewart et al. (2022):

- - Eusthenopteron
  - - Panderichthys
    - - Qikiqtania
      - Tiktaalik
      - Elpistostege
      - - Acanthostega
        - Ichthyostega

A 2024 phylogeny placed Qikiqtania immediately crownward to Tiktaalik, followed by Elginerpeton and Elpistostege.
