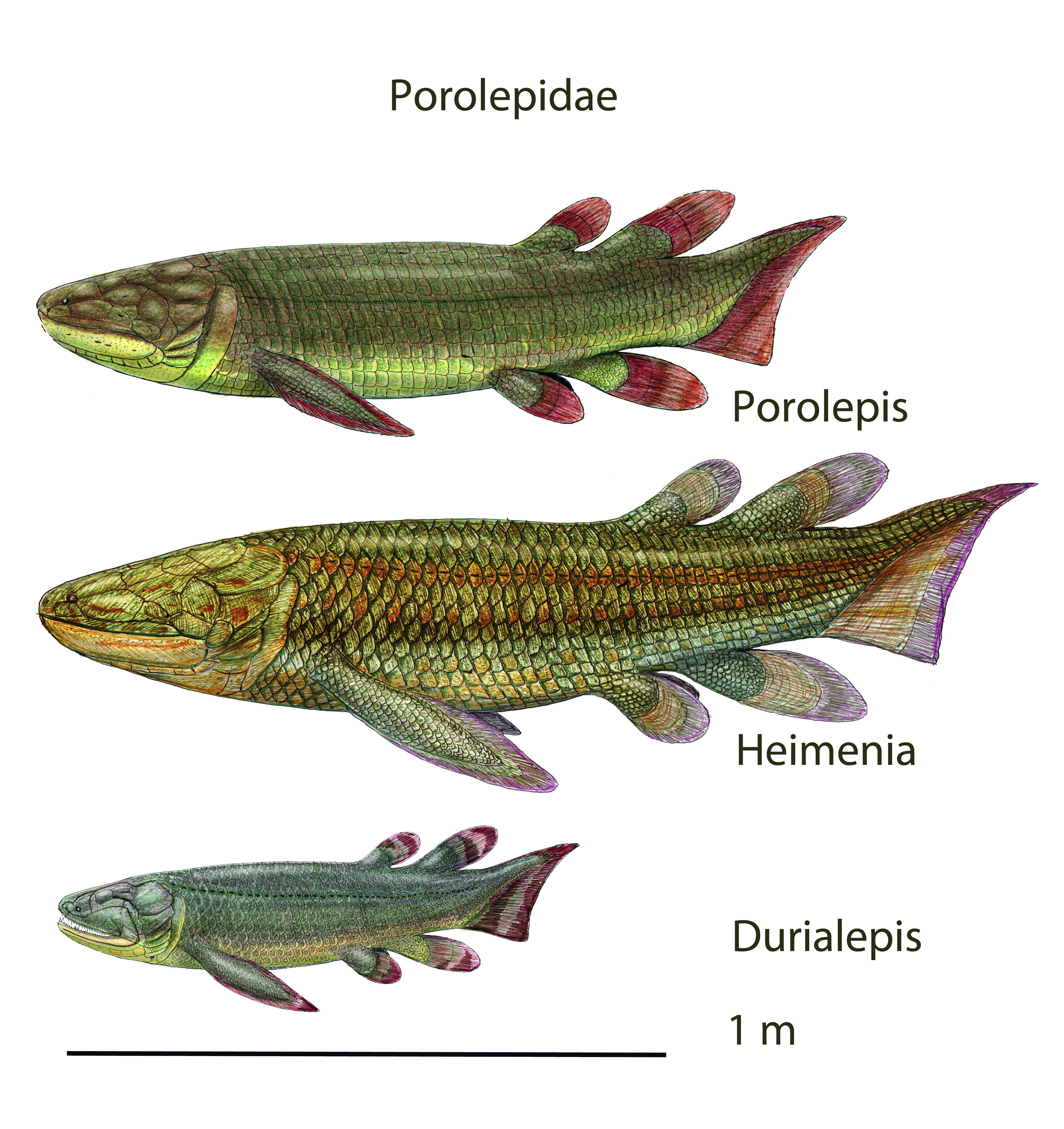
- Heimenia compared with its relatives

Scientific classification
- Kingdom: Animalia
- Phylum: Chordata
- Order: †Porolepiformes
- Family: †Porolepididae
- Genus: †Heimenia; Orvig, 1969

= Heimenia =

Extinct genus of bony fishes

Heimenia is an extinct genus of prehistoric sarcopterygian or lobe-finned fish.

== See also ==
- Sarcopterygii
- List of sarcopterygians
- List of prehistoric bony fish
