= Duffichthys =

Duffichthys Temporal range: Late Devonian

Scientific classification
- Kingdom: Animalia
- Phylum: Chordata
- Order: †Porolepiformes
- Genus: †Duffichthys; Ahlberg, 1992

Type species
- †Duffichthys mirabilis Ahlberg, 1992

Extinct genus of bony fishes

Duffichthys is a genus of prehistoric lobe-finned fish which lived during the Late Devonian period. Fossils have been found at the locality of Scat Craig, Scotland.
