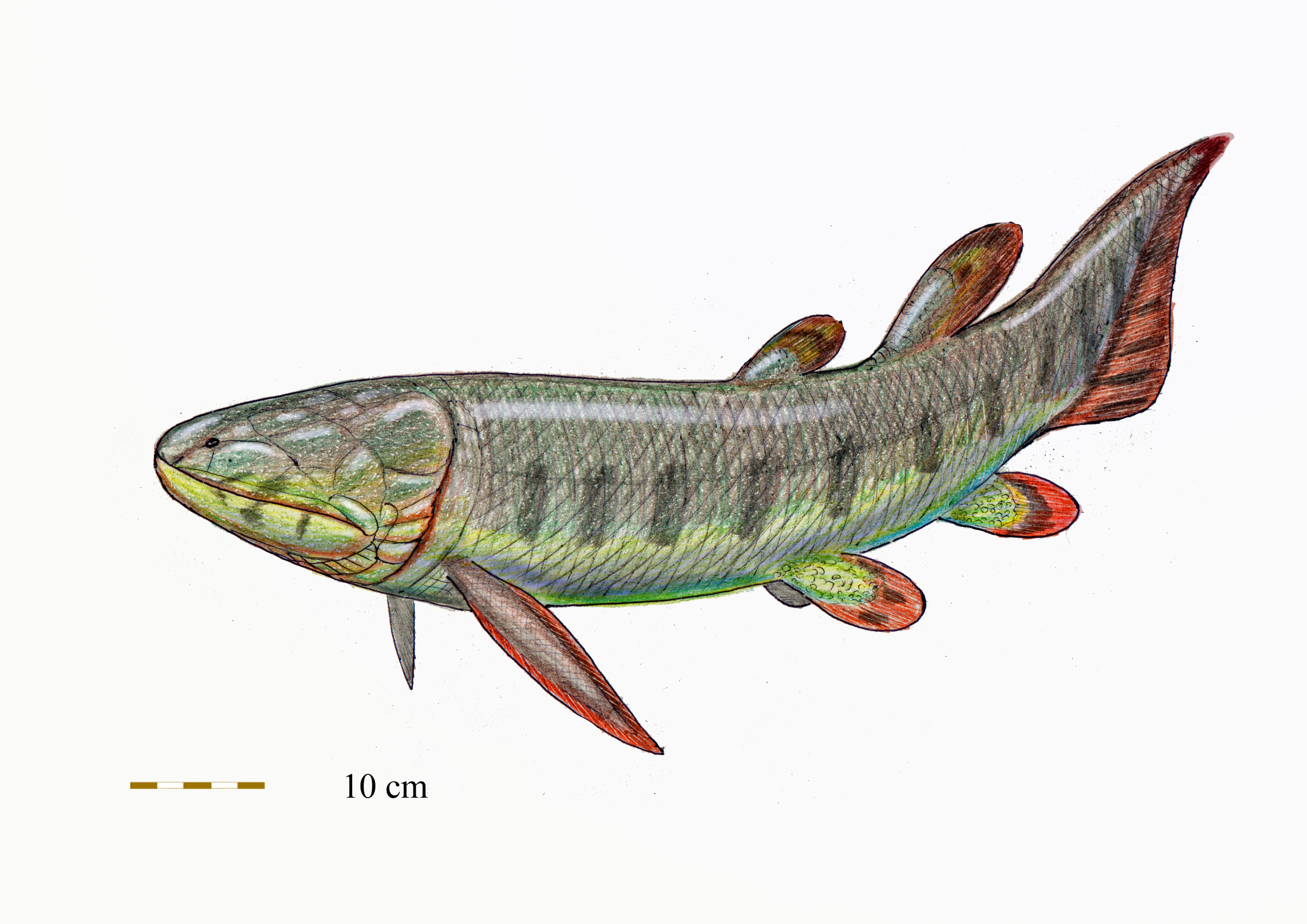
- Restoration

Scientific classification
- Kingdom: Animalia
- Phylum: Chordata
- Order: †Porolepiformes
- Family: †Porolepididae
- Genus: †Porolepis; Woodward, 1891

Type species
- †Porolepis posnaniensis (Kade, 1858)

Other species
- †P. brevis Jarvik, 1937; †P. elongata Jarvik, 1937; †P. foxi Johanson et al., 2013; †P. hefteri Gross, 1935; †P. kureikensis Vorobyeva, 1963; †P. siegenensis Gross, 1935; †P. spitsbergensis Jarvik, 1937; †P. uralensis Obrutchev, 1938

= Porolepis =

Porolepis Temporal range: Early Devonian, ~409.1–402.5 Ma

Extinct genus of bony fishes

Porolepis is an extinct genus of porolepiform sarcopterygian fish, from the Early Devonian Dniester Series of Ukraine, which is rich in Porolepis remains, and also the Nellen Koepfchen Beds of Germany. It lived alongside the dubious lophotrochozoan Macrodontophion. It was first described in 1858 but Porolepis was not named as a sufficient species until 1891.

== See also ==
- Sarcopterygii
- List of sarcopterygians
- List of prehistoric bony fish
