= Ashton F. Embry =

Canadian research scientist

Ashton F. Embry (born August 13, 1946) is a Canadian research scientist at the Geological Survey of Canada.

Embry is a graduate of the University of Manitoba, who received a PhD in stratigraphy from the University of Calgary in 1976. He first did field work in the Arctic Islands of Canada in 1969 and has studied the geology of this area ever since, establishing stratigraphy, sedimentology and petroleum geology of the Mesozoic succession of the Sverdrup Basin Magmatic Province. The fossil sarcopterygian fish Laccognathus embryi of the Devonian was named in his honour.

== Published works ==
- Balkwill, H.R.; Embry, Ashton F. (1982). Arctic Geology and Geophysics: Proceedings of the Third International Symposium on Arctic Geology (Hardcover). Canadian Society of Petroleum Geologists. ISBN 0-920230-19-9.
- Glass, Donald J.; Embry, Ashton F.; McMillan, N. J. Devonian of the World: Proceedings of the Second International Symposium on the Devonian System (Hardcover). Calgary, Canada: Canadian Society of Petroleum Geologists. ISBN 0-920230-47-4.
- Glass, Donald J.; Embry, Ashton F.; Beauchamp, Benoit. Pangea: Global Environments and Resources (Hardcover). Canadian Society of Petroleum Geologists. ISBN 0-920230-57-1.
- Embry, Ashton F. (10 January 1989). "Arctic Geoscience/Arctic ocean rim: Geological and geophysical evidence in support of the hypothesis of anticlockwise rotation of northern Alaska". Marine Geology. 93. 3303-33rd St. NW, Calgary, Alta. T2L 2A7 Canada: Geological Survey of Canada: 317–329. doi:10.1016/0025-3227(90)90090-7. On line=7 April 2003
- "List of published works, Ashton F. Embry". National Resources Canada.
