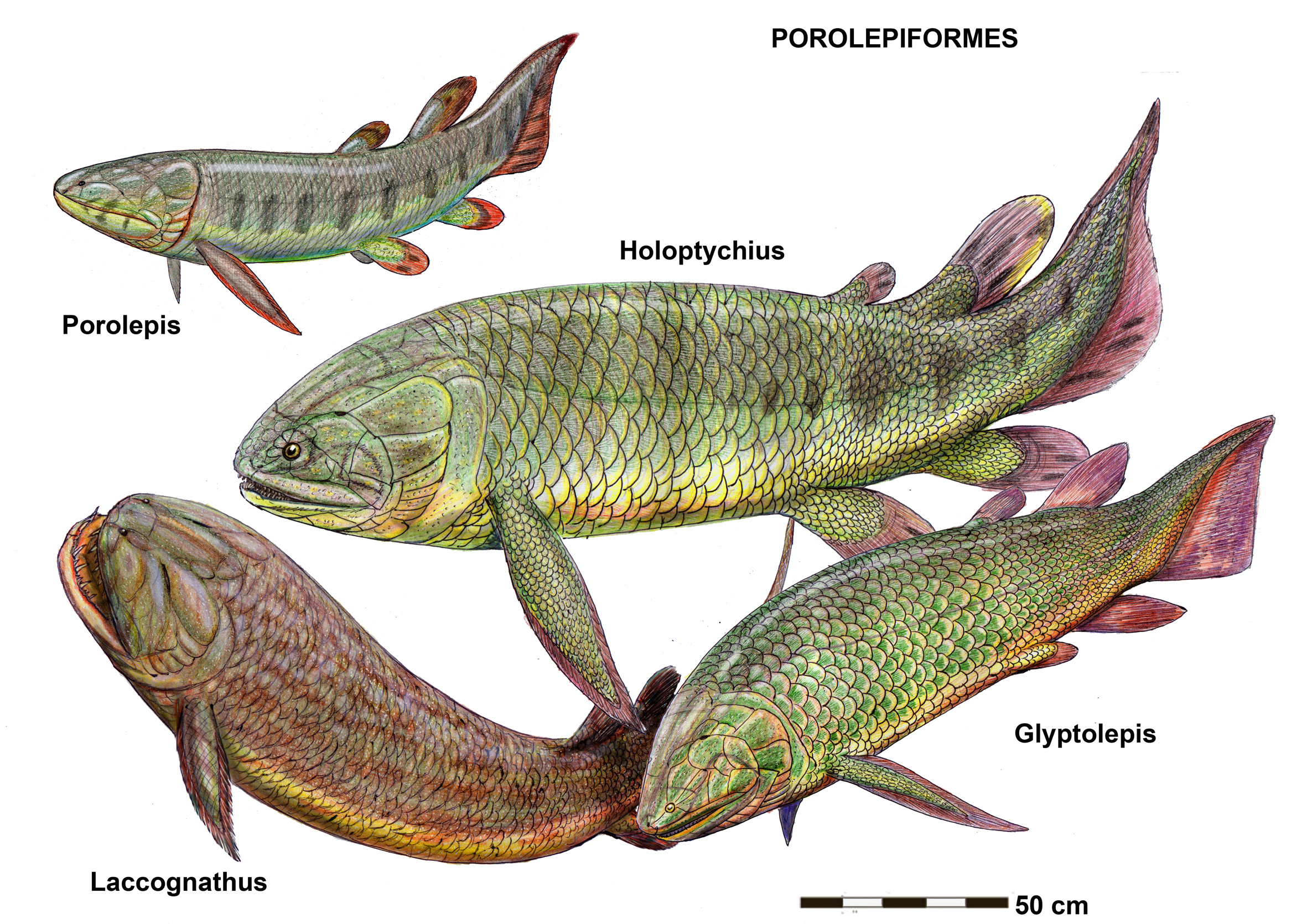
- Various genera

Scientific classification
- Kingdom: Animalia
- Phylum: Chordata
- Clade: Sarcopterygii
- Clade: Rhipidistia
- Clade: Dipnomorpha
- Order: †Porolepiformes; Jarvik 1942

Genera
- See text

= Porolepiformes =

Porolepiforms Temporal range: 416–318 Ma Devonian and Carboniferous

Extinct order of bony fishes

Porolepiformes is an order of prehistoric lobe-finned fish which lived during the Devonian period (about 416 to 359 million years ago). They are thought to represent the sister group to lungfish (class Dipnoi). The group contains two families: Holoptychiidae and Porolepididae.

Porolepiformes was established by the Swedish paleontologist Erik Jarvik, and were thought to have given rise to the salamanders and caecilians independently of the other tetrapods. He based this conclusion on the shapes of the snouts of the aforementioned groups. This view is no longer in favour in paleontology.

Jarvik also claimed the existence of choanae in porolepiformes which linked them to tetrapods, but this has remained controversial. Recent phylogenetic reconstruction places porolepiformes close to lungfishes.

More recent evidence has shown that at least one genus Laccognathus was most likely amphibious.

== Taxonomy ==
Based on Schultze, 2000 & Mondéjar-Fernández et al (2020):

- †Durialepis Otto, 2007
- †Heimenia Orvig, 1969
- †"Porolepidae"
  - †Porolepis Woodward, 1891
- †Holoptychiidae Owen, 1860
  - ?†Duffichthys Ahlberg, 1992
  - †Glyptolepis Agassiz, 1843
  - ?†Hamodus Obruchev, 1933
  - †Holoptychius Agassiz, 1839
  - †Laccognathus Gross, 1941
  - †Quebecius Schultze & Arsenault, 1987
  - †Nasogaluakus Schultze, 2000
  - ?†Paraglyptolepis Vorobyeva, 1987
  - †Pseudosauripterus White, 1961
- †Ventalepididae Lebedev & Luksevics, 2018
  - †Ventalepis Schultze, 1980

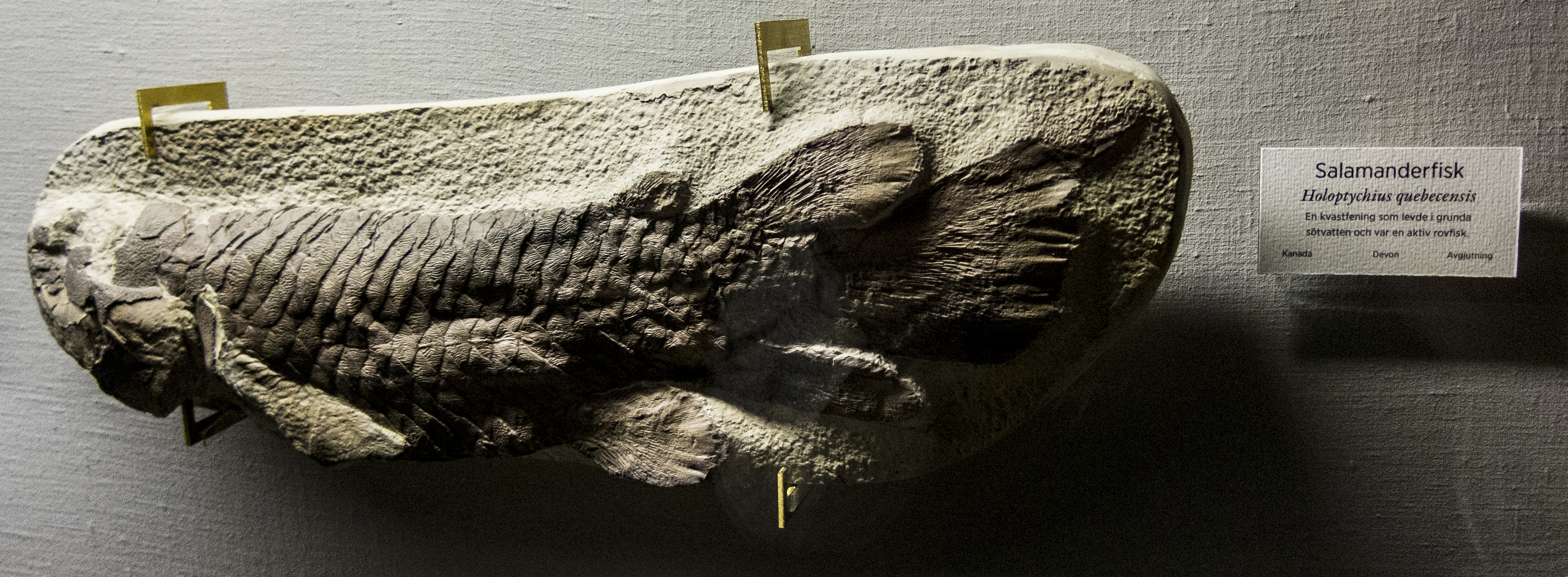
Porolepiform fossil (cast) from a Swedish natural history museum. Note that the description calls it a "Salamander fish", in accordance with Jarvik's obsolete hypothesis.

=== Phylogeny ===
Mikko's Phylogeny Archive:

- - †Porolepidae
    - †Heimenia ensis ØRvik 1969
    - †Porolepis
      - †P. brevis Jarvik 1937
      - †P. elongata Jarvik 1937
      - †P. posnaniensis (Kade 1858)
      - †P. siegenensis Gross 1935
      - †P. spitsbergensis Jarvik 1937
  - †Holoptychidae
    - ?†Ventalepis ketleriensis Schultze 1980
    - ?†Duffichthys mirabilis Ahlberg 1992
    - †Pseudosauripterus anglicus (Woodward 1891)
    - †Glyptolepis
      - †G. baltica
      - †G. groenlandica Jarvik 1972
      - †G. leptopterus Agassiz 1844
      - †G. paucidens
    - †Holoptychius
      - †H. americanus Leidy 1843
      - †H. flemingi Agassiz 1844
      - †H. giganteus Agassiz 1839
      - †H. halli Newberry 1889
      - †H. hopkinsii M'Coy 1844
      - †H. nobilissimus Agassiz 1835
      - †H. quebecensis
    - †Laccognathus
      - †L. panderi^{T} Gross 1941
      - †L. grossi Vorobyeva 2006
      - †L. embryi Downs et al. 2011
