= Glyptolepis (plant) =

Scientific classification
- Kingdom: Plantae
- Division: Pinophyta
- Class: Pinopsida
- Order: †Voltziales
- Family: incertae sedis
- Genus: †Glyptolepis Schimper

Type species
- †Glyptolepis keuperiana Schimper

Species
- See text

Synonyms
- Glyptolepidium Heer

Extinct genus of conifers

Glyptolepis is an extinct morphogenus of female conifer cones from the Triassic. It was established in 1872 by the French botanist Wilhelm Philippe Schimper. The morphogenus is characterized by having bract scale complexes with elongated seed scale stalks. The seed scales each contain two recurved ovules and are distinctively flattened with five or six lobes. The name is derived from Ancient Greek γλυπτό (glyptó, "sculpture" or "carved") and λεπίς (lepís, "scale").

Glyptolepis is classified under the extinct conifer order Voltziales, but its placement within the Voltziales families is currently unknown. Although numerous fossil cones have been assigned to the genus in the past, a review by Axsmith and Taylor (1997) have concluded that only two species are valid for the genus, and all other species were assigned in error. The species included under Glyptolepis are:

- Glyptolepis keuperiana Schimper
- Glyptolepis richteri Axsmith & Taylor

== See also ==
- Paleobotany
