= Gauja =

River in Estonia and Latvia

Gauja Koiva
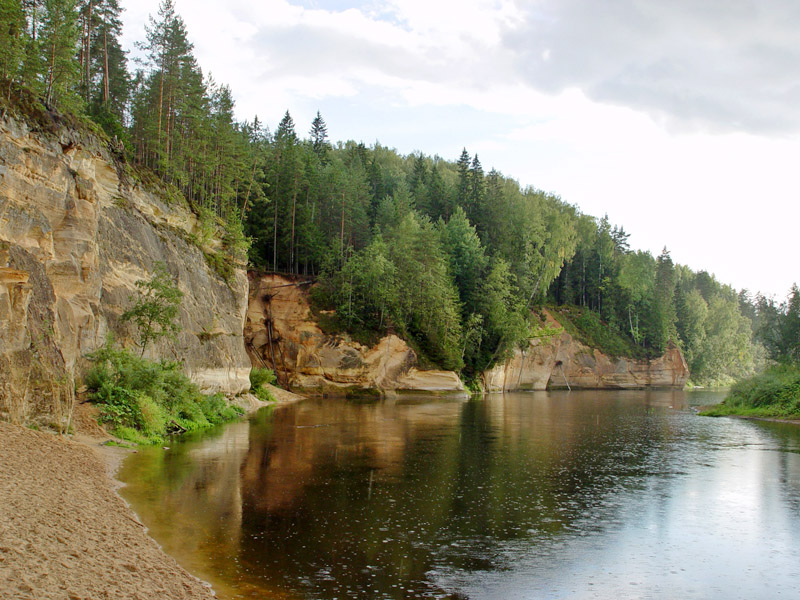
- The Ērgļu cliffs, a Devonian sandstone formation, along the Gauja River

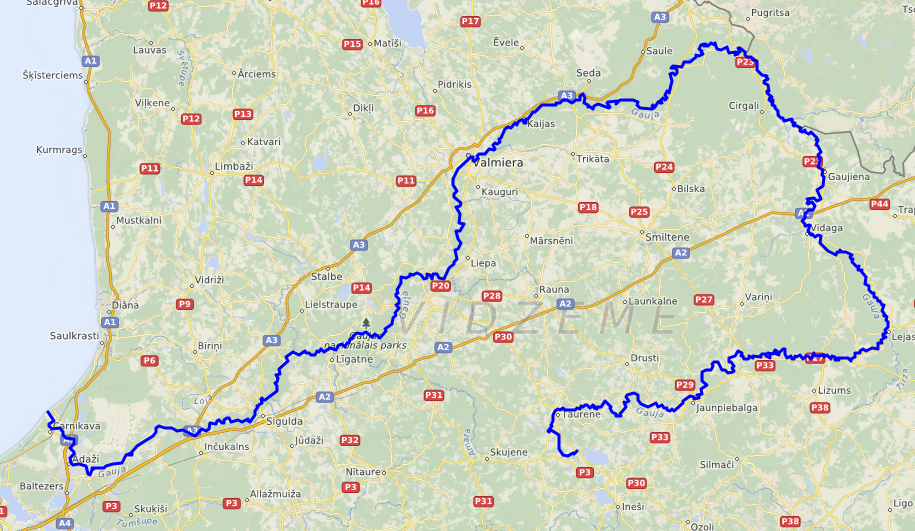

Location
- Countries: Latvia; Estonia

Physical characteristics
- Source
  - location: Vidzeme Highland
  - elevation: 234 metres (768 ft)
- Mouth: Gulf of Riga
  - location: Carnikava
  - coordinates: 57°09′33″N 24°15′59″E
- Length: 452 kilometres (281 mi)
- Basin size: 9,800 km^{2} (3,800 sq mi)
- Discharge
  - average: 71 m^{3}/s (2,500 cu ft/s)

The Gauja River (Estonian: Koiva jõgi, Livonian: Koiva, German: Livländische Aa) is a river in the Vidzeme region of Latvia. It is the only large river of Latvia that begins and ends its flow in Latvia. Its length is 460 km, of which 93.5 km (approximately one-fifth) are in Gauja National Park. In this part, the Gauja River flows through the Gauja Valley, which is between 1 and 2.5 km wide, and the maximum depth near Sigulda is 85 m. Thus, the Gauja is the longest river of Latvia if only the parts of the river in the country's territory are counted. The Daugava has only 367 km in Latvia, whereas the entire length of the river is over 1,000 km.

The sandstone rocks on the banks of the Gauja and its adjoining rivers started forming 370 to 300 million years ago, during the Devonian period.

== History ==
Before the 13th century, the Gauja River used to serve as a trade route and border river between the Livonian and Latgalian lands. In some territories, they used to live mixed together. When Livonian languages were still present along the Gauja River and the sea, it used to be called Koivo (the Birch River; Livonian keùv or Estonian kõiv). In Latvian, the name of the Gauja River used to mean 'a great amount', 'a crowd', and was therefore called the 'big river'. The Livonians suffered greatly during the Great Northern War and suffered a plague in the 18th century. That was the period when the remaining Livonians assimilated with the Latvians.

== Today ==
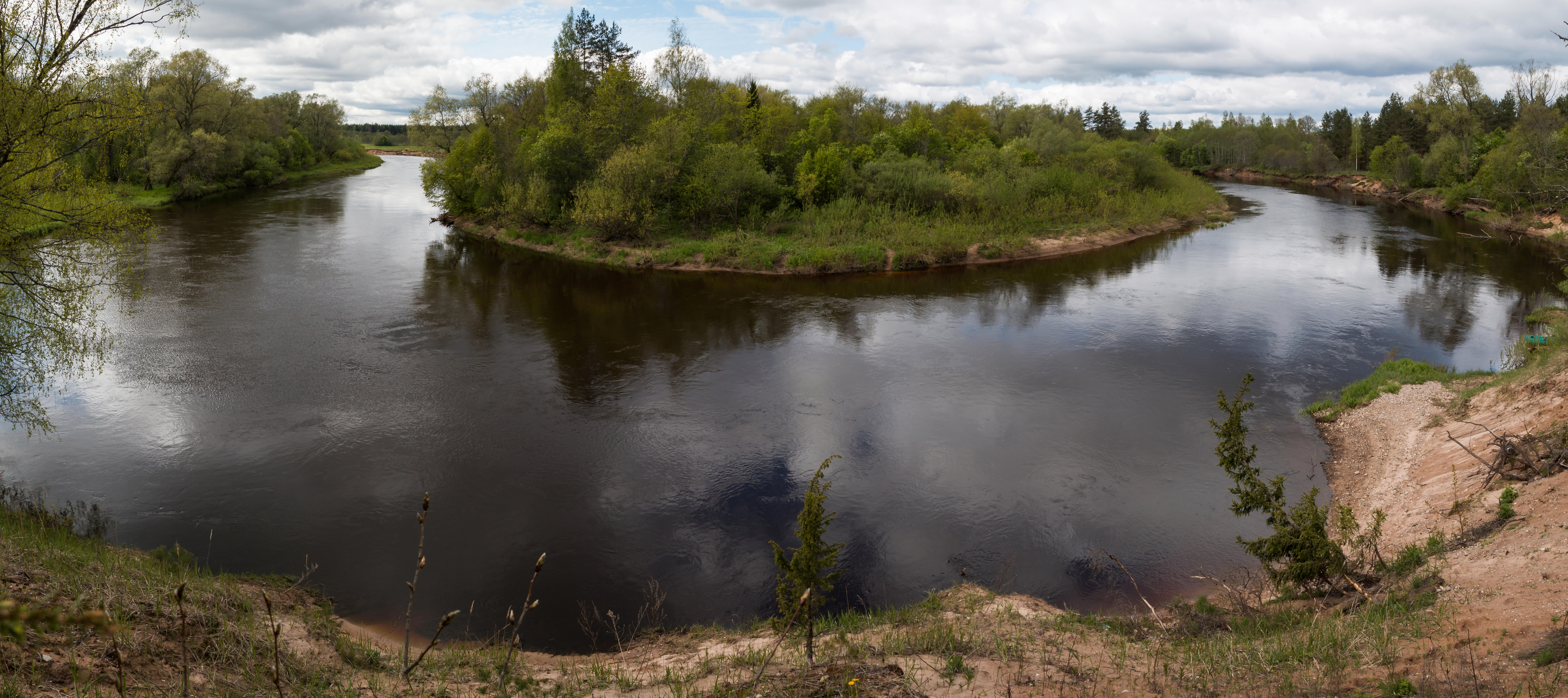
Panoramic view of the Gauja River, on the border between Estonia and Latvia

The Gauja River tends to change its bed rapidly, and has gained the reputation of being deceitful. The bed of the river is made of unconsolidated sand and gravel deposits that move along with the current. In some places, the bed is pebbly, forming boulder rapids: Kazu, Raiskuma, Rakšu, and Ķūķu. The bottom of the river in Gauja National Park is 60 to 120 meters wide with a rapidly changing depth from 0.3 m to 7 m. The decline is 0.5 m/km. The speed of flow during low water is 0.2 to 0.4 m/s, and during the spring water period 2 to 3 m/s. Due to the fluctuations in water level, current speed, and special flow features, the Gauja River may be characterized as a rather non-homogeneous watercourse.

Usually the Gauja River freezes over in mid-December, and the ice starts moving in late March. During warm winters, the river does not freeze over. Much underground water flows into the Gauja River. It therefore has a lower water temperature than other large rivers in Latvia.

== See also ==
- Gauja Estonians
- Gauja Formation
- Gauja Valley
