= Megadonichthys =

Scientific classification
- Domain: Eukaryota
- Kingdom: Animalia
- Phylum: Chordata
- Clade: Sarcopterygii
- Clade: Tetrapodomorpha
- Order: †Osteolepiformes
- Family: †Osteolepididae
- Genus: †Megadonichthys; Vorobyeva, 2004
- Species: †M. kurikae

Binomial name
- †Megadonichthys kurikae Vorobyeva, 2004

Extinct genus of tetrapodomorphs

Megadonichthys kurikae is an extinct species of fish belonging to the family Osteolepididae.

It is found in Estonia.
