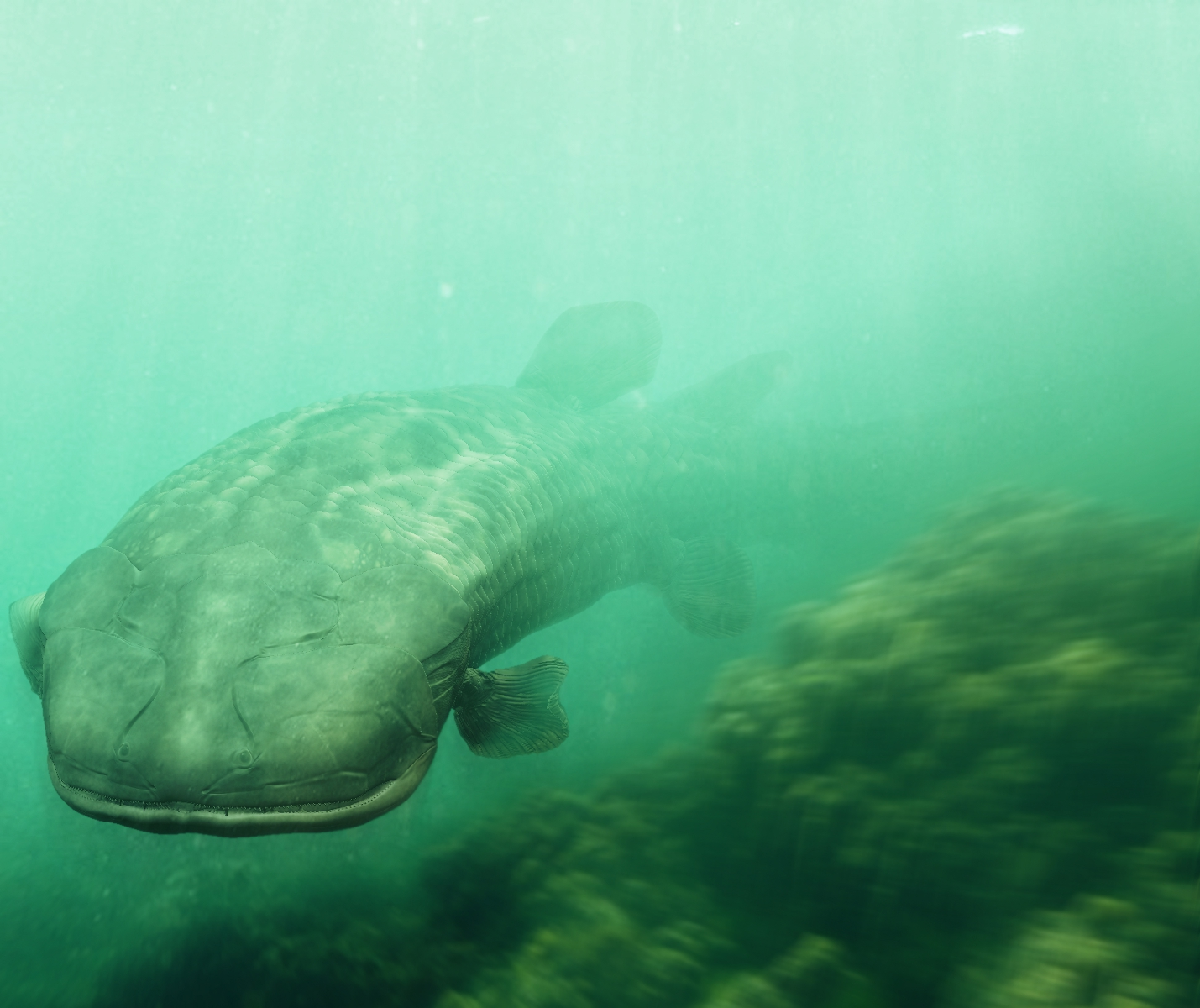
- Reconstruction of Laccognathus panderi

Scientific classification
- Domain: Eukaryota
- Kingdom: Animalia
- Phylum: Chordata
- Clade: Sarcopterygii
- Class: †Porolepimorpha
- Order: †Porolepiformes
- Family: †Holoptychiidae
- Genus: †Laccognathus
- Species: †L. panderi

Binomial name
- †Laccognathus panderi Gross, 1941

= Laccognathus panderi =

Laccognathus panderi Temporal range: Middle to Late Devonian

Extinct species of fish

Laccognathus panderi is an extinct lobe-finned fish from northern Europe. They existed from the Middle Devonian to the Late Devonian (around 397.5 to 360 mya).

L. panderi has been recovered from the Middle Devonian Gauja Formation and Late Devonian Amata Formation of Latvia, the Kalmetumägi outcrop of Estonia, and the Lower Frasnian stage rocks of the Kursk region in Russia in what appears to have been either a marine coastal region or a lagoon.

== See also ==
- Sarcopterygii
- List of sarcopterygians
- List of prehistoric bony fish
