= Gauja National Park =

National park in Latvia

- IUCN category II (national park)
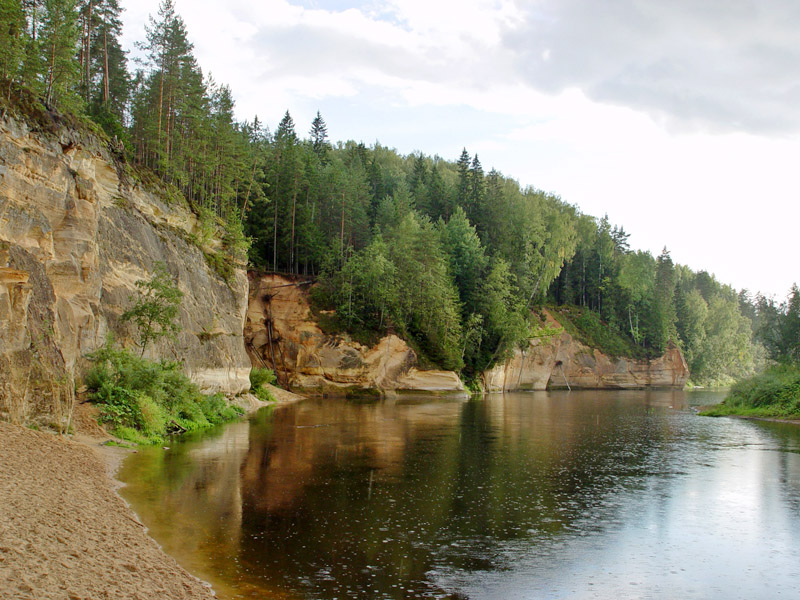
- Eagles' Cliffs on the Gauja

- Location within Latvia
- Interactive map of Gauja National Park
- Location: Latvia
- Nearest city: Cēsis
- Coordinates: 57°25′0″N 25°25′0″E
- Area: 917.87 km^{2} (354.39 sq mi)
- Established: 1973
- Governing body: Ministry of Environmental Protection and Regional Development
- Website: Gauja National Park

Gauja National Park (Latvian: Gaujas nacionālais parks) in Vidzeme is the largest national park in Latvia, with an area of 917.86 km^{2} running from north-east of Sigulda to south-west of Cēsis along the valley of the Gauja River, from which the park takes its name.

It was established in order to protect slightly disturbed natural areas, promote nature tourism and ensure sustainable development in the area. The national park is characterized by a high biological diversity, rock outcrops and varied terrain shapes, springs, picturesque landscapes and many historical and cultural monuments from different centuries. The major part of the national park and the dominant is the old valley of the Gauja River. The valley is protected and at the same time it can be used for nature and cultural history tourism, as well as healthy recreation.

The park administration is based in Sigulda.

== Description ==
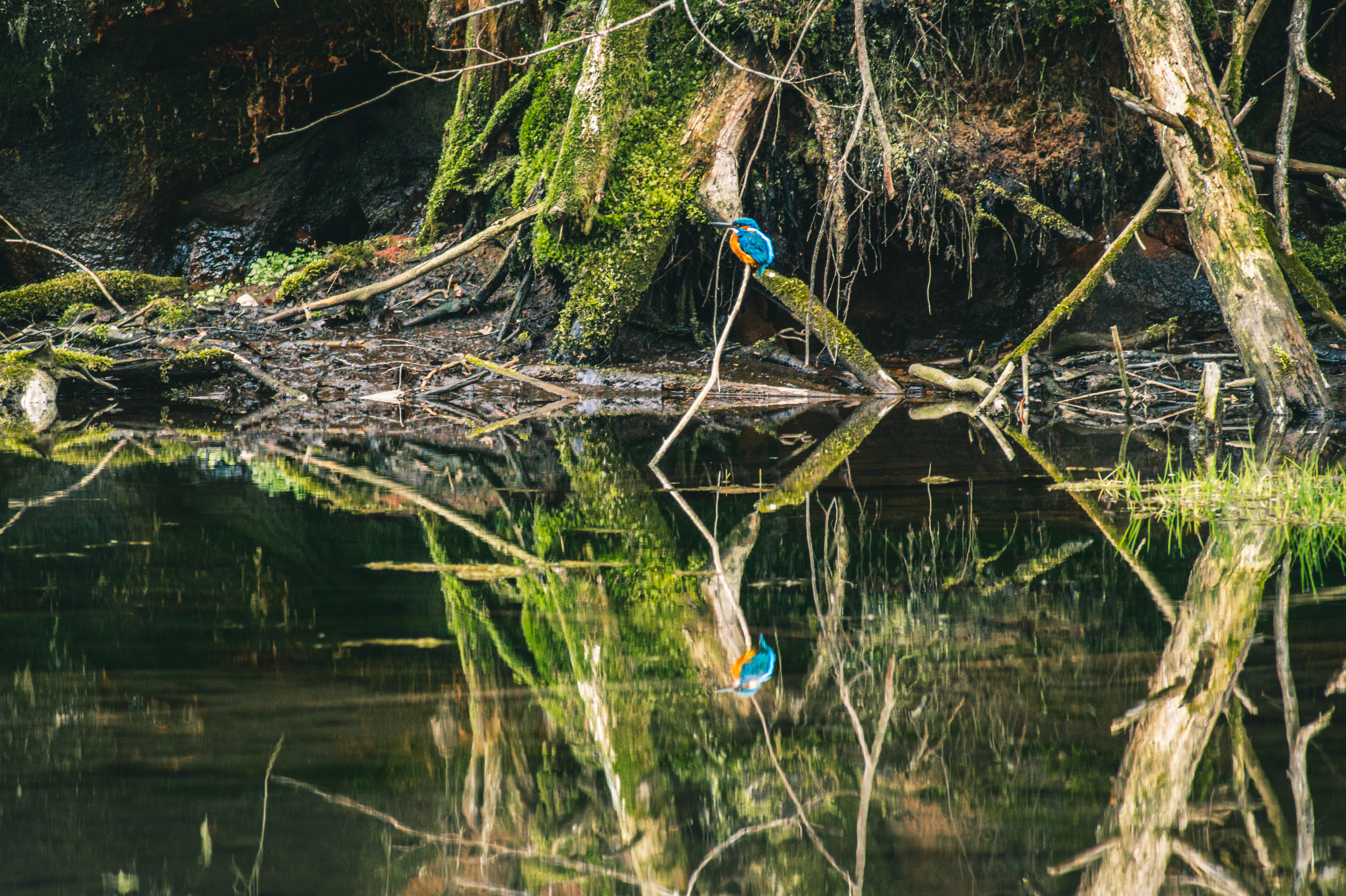
Kingfisher in the national park

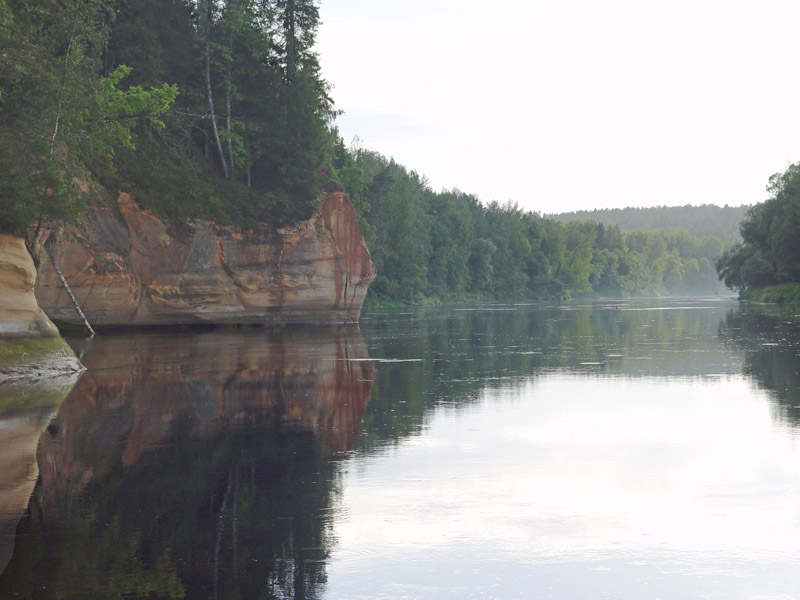
Sandstone cliffs on the Gauja, near Cēsis

The area of the park is 918 square kilometers (354 sq mi) and it is divided into five functional zones. Nature reserves take up a small part of the park and visits are prohibited to these areas. In the rest of the park, only economic activities that leave the landscape intact are permitted.

Forests cover about 47%, almost half of the territory. There are almost 900 plant species, 149 bird, and 48 mammal species. Since 2004 Gauja National Park has been part of the Natura 2000 network as a territory designated for conservation of protected species and biotopes. Gauja National Park has a long history of tourism. Hiking in the Sigulda area with walking-sticks goes back as far as the 19th century. Every year thousands of visitors are attracted by the unique landscape, the largest Devonian rock outcrops – sandstone precipices, rocks and caves, as well as monuments of culture and history, which are twined with many legends and stories.

In the national park, there are over 500 monuments of history and culture – hill forts, stone castles, churches, manors, water and windmills, as well as other archaeological, architectural and art monuments.

== See also ==
- List of national parks in the Baltics
- Gauja Formation
