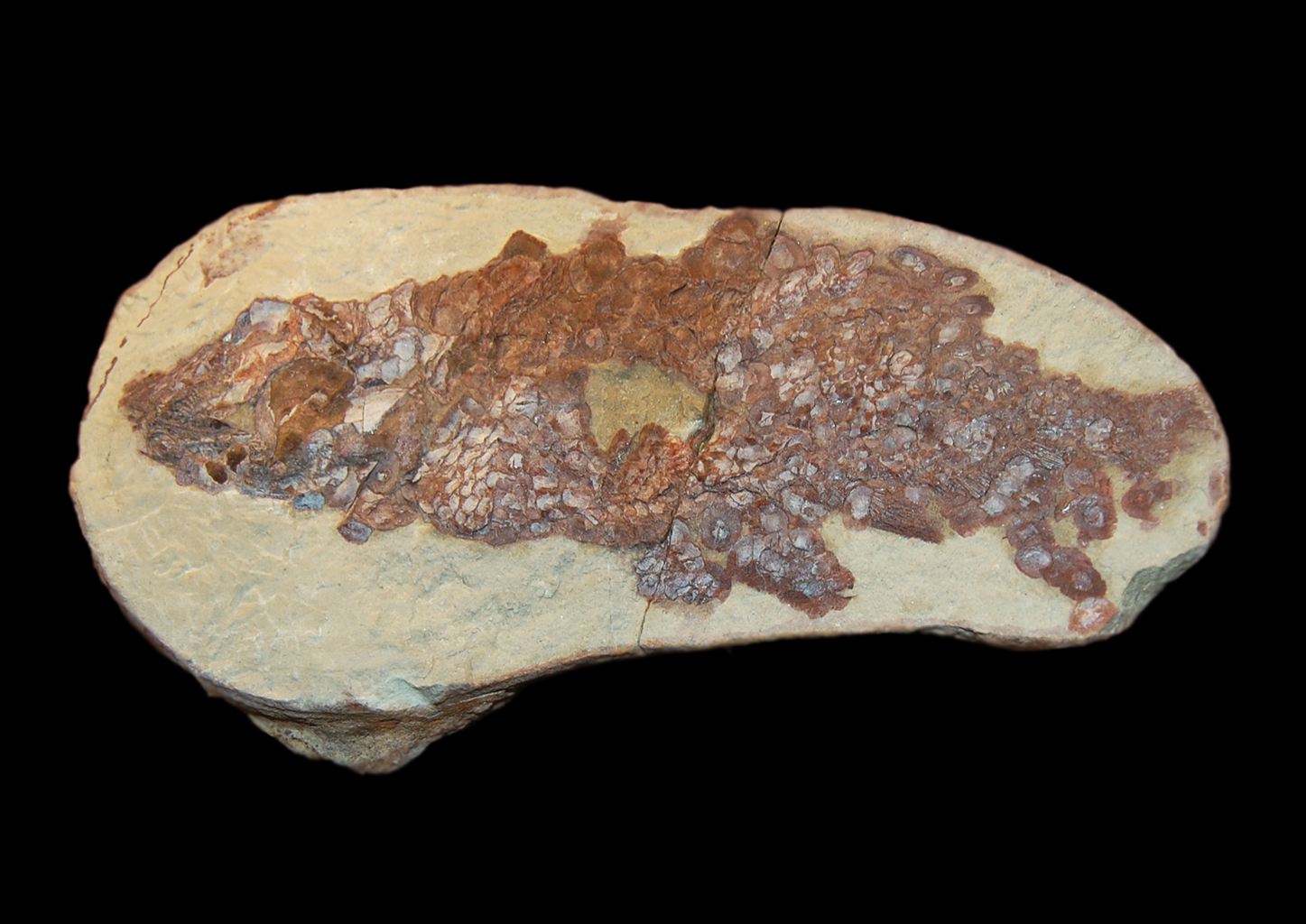
- Glyptolepis fossil from the Naturhistorisches Museum Wien
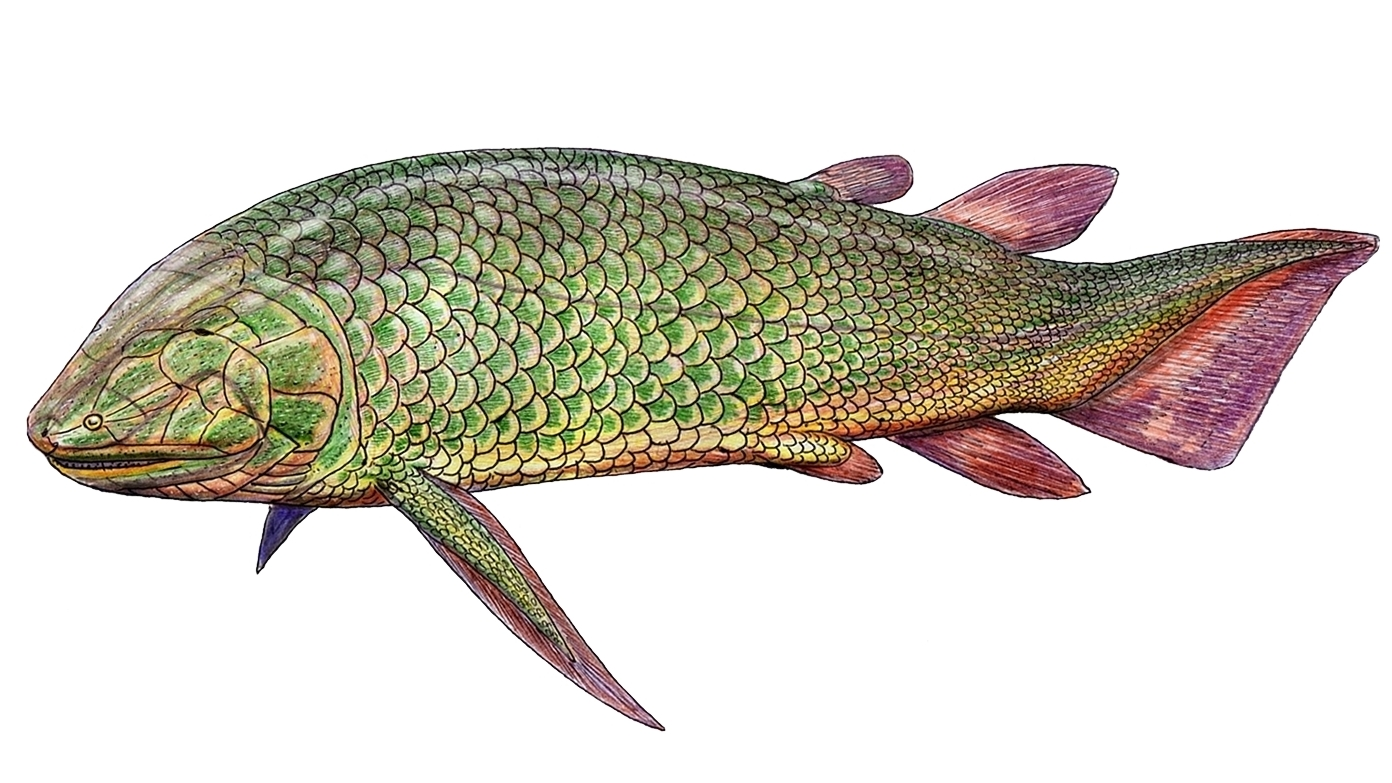
- Glyptolepis reconstruction

Scientific classification
- Kingdom: Animalia
- Phylum: Chordata
- Order: †Porolepiformes
- Family: †Holoptychiidae
- Genus: †Glyptolepis; Agassiz, 1843

Type species
- †Glyptolepis leptopterus Agassiz, 1844

Species
- See text

= Glyptolepis (fish) =

Glyptolepis Temporal range: Eifelian to Givetian

Extinct genus of bony fishes

Glyptolepis is an extinct genus of freshwater porolepiform lobe-finned fish which lived during Devonian Period, from the early Eifelian to the Givetian Age.

The following species are known:

- †G. baltica Gross, 1936 - Givetian of Latvia (Lode Formation)
- †G. groenlandica Jarvik, 1972 - Eifelian of Greenland (Nathorst Fjord Formation)
- †G. leptopterus Agassiz, 1844 (type species) - Eifelian of Scotland (Caithness Flagstone), including Orkney Isles (=G. elegans Agassiz, 1844)
- †G. paucidens (Agassiz, 1844) - Eifelian of Scotland (Caithness Flagstone), including Orkney Isles

The former species G. microlepidotus is now placed in its own genus, Gyroptychius, as is G. quebecensis, now placed in Quebecius.

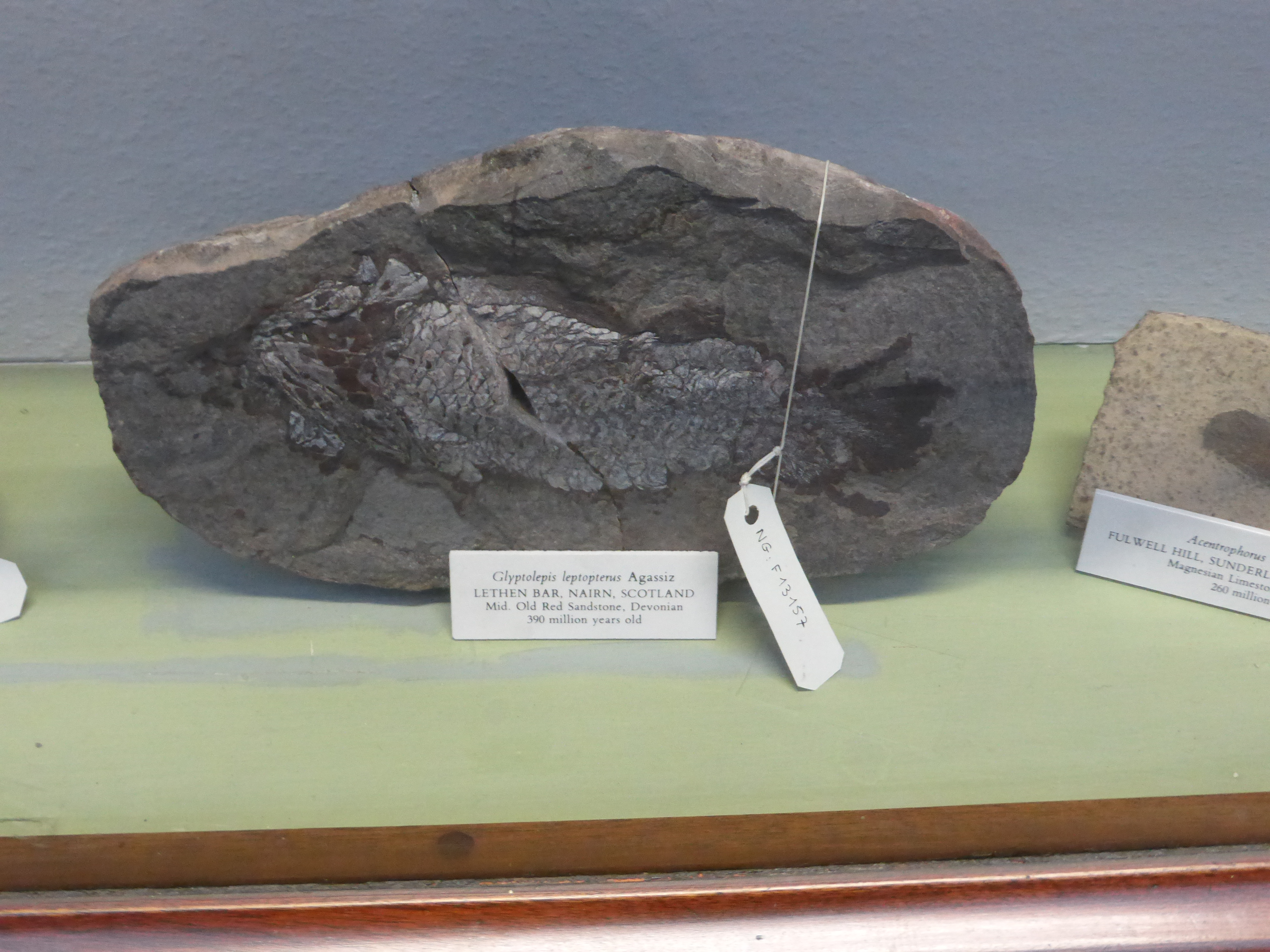
G. leptopterus in National Museum of Ireland - Natural History

Glyptolepis is considered a stem lungfish, and its pectoral fins especially resemble those of the extant lungfish Neoceratodus.

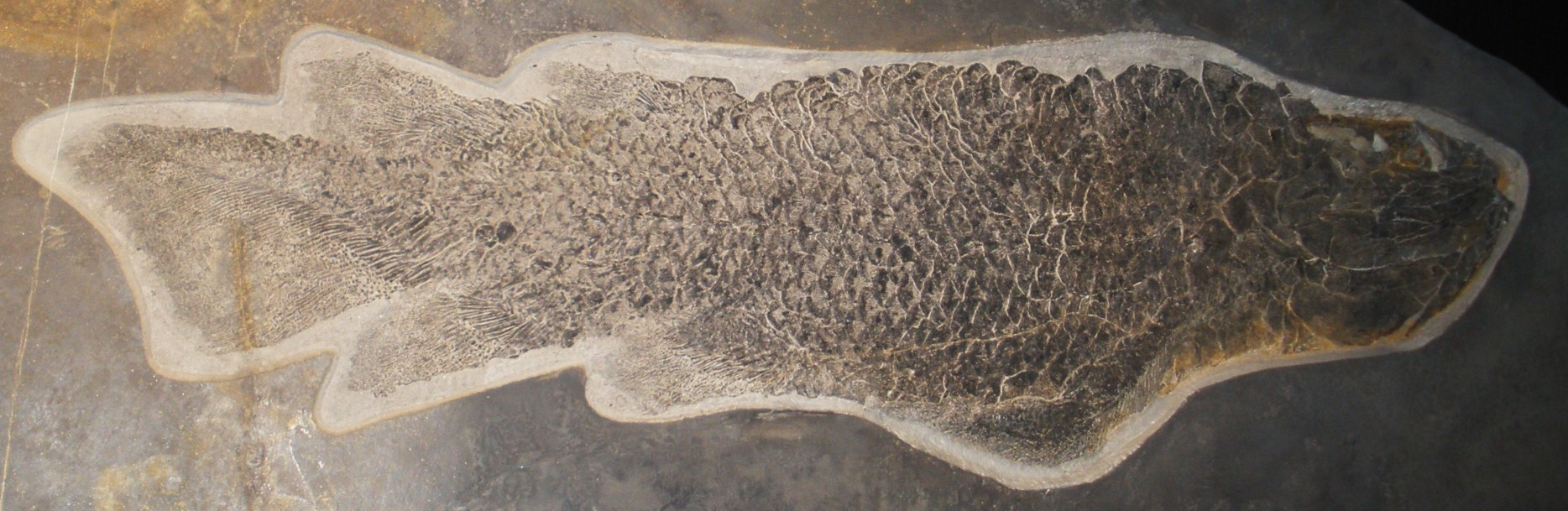
Specimen of G. paucidens

G. groenlandica is known from a three-dimensionally preserved skull, of which the morphology of the braincase and the endocast is relatively well-known due to serial grinding, among the best known internal cranial anatomy of any porolepiform.
