= Gauja Formation =

Geological formation in Latvia

- Stratigraphic range: Givetian; ~388–384 Ma
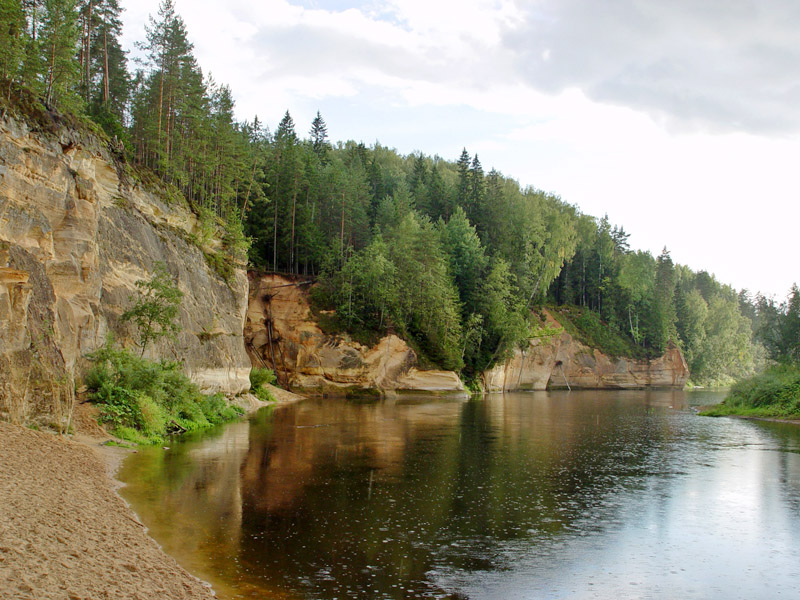
- The Ergelu Cliffs along Gauja River, Latvia belong to the Gauja Formation
- Type: Geological formation
- Sub-units: Sietin & Lode Members
- Underlies: Amata Formation
- Overlies: Plavinas Formation
- Thickness: 80 m (260 ft)

Lithology
- Primary: Sandstone
- Other: Siltstone

Location
- Coordinates: 57.30°N 25.12°E
- Approximate paleocoordinates: 10.9°S 10.7°E
- Country: Estonia, Latvia

Type section
- Named for: Gauja River
- Gauja Formation (Latvia)

The Gauja Formation is a Middle Devonian fossil locality in Estonia and Latvia. It is named after the Gauja River, where it is exposed along the banks.

== Description ==
The Gauja Formation has a maximum thickness of 80 m (260 ft). It is composed of weakly to moderately cemented layers of fine-grained to very fine-grained sandstone. The layer is predominantly light to yellowish-gray in color, but can be pinkish brown or variegated. It is mostly composed of quartzose arenites. It is overlain by the 30 m (98 ft) thick Amata Formation and the Plavinas Formation.

The Gauja Formation contains two cyclic members. The lower layers are known as the Sietiņi Member and are composed mostly of sandstone with a thin layer of siltstone at the top.

The upper layers are thicker, and the lower part of it is known as the Lode Member. The Lode Member dates from the Middle Devonian and is composed of light colored sandstone. The area is indicative of a near-shore environment of retreating sea.

== Paleontology ==
The Sietiņi and Lode members have yielded numerous fossils of fishes. Among them are Asterolepis, Bothriolepis, Psammolepis, Cheirolepis, Glyptolepis baltica, Laccognathus panderi, Livoniana multidentata, Strunius, Panderichthys and Megadonichthys kurikae The first fossils of young placoderms ever discovered were found in the Gauja formation. Ranging in size from as small as 10.4 mm to as big as 38 mm (0.4 to 1.4 in) long, these fossils are important for our understanding of ontogeny in extinct fish.

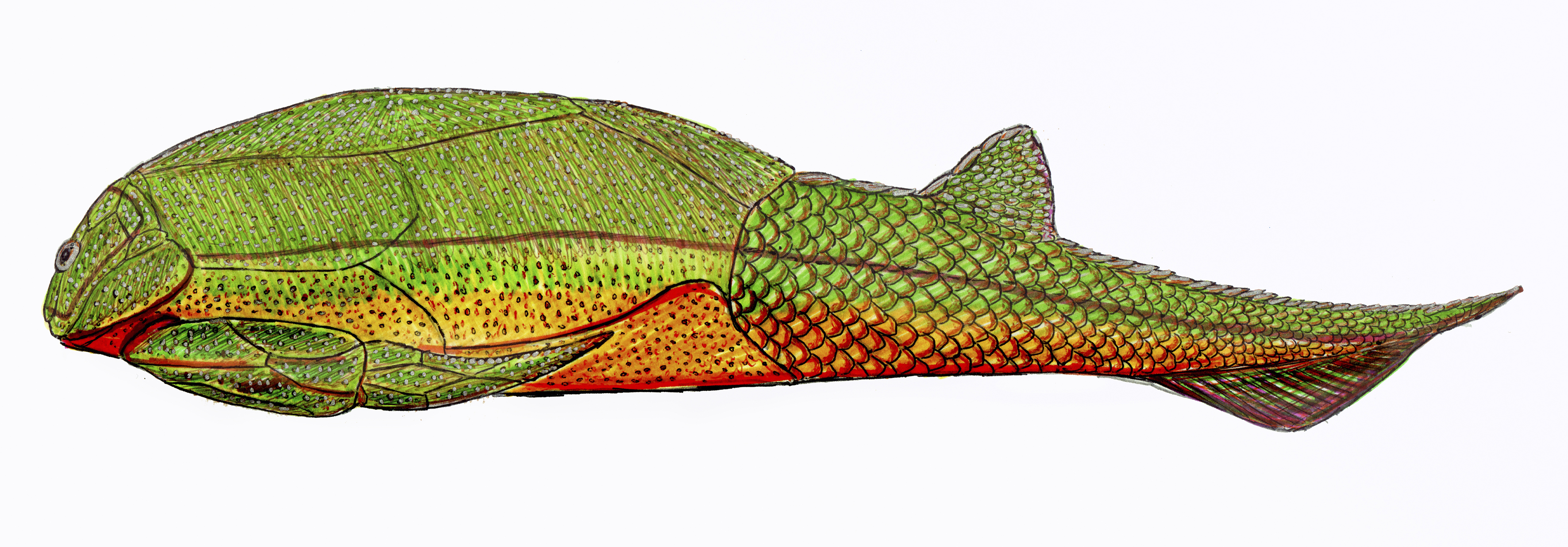
Asterolepis ornata

Only large plant remains and miospores are known from this member. Examples of which include Hostinella, Archaeopteris, Retusotriletes rugulatus, and Ancyrospora. Palynological studies indicate that the Middle to Upper Devonian boundary may exist in this member.

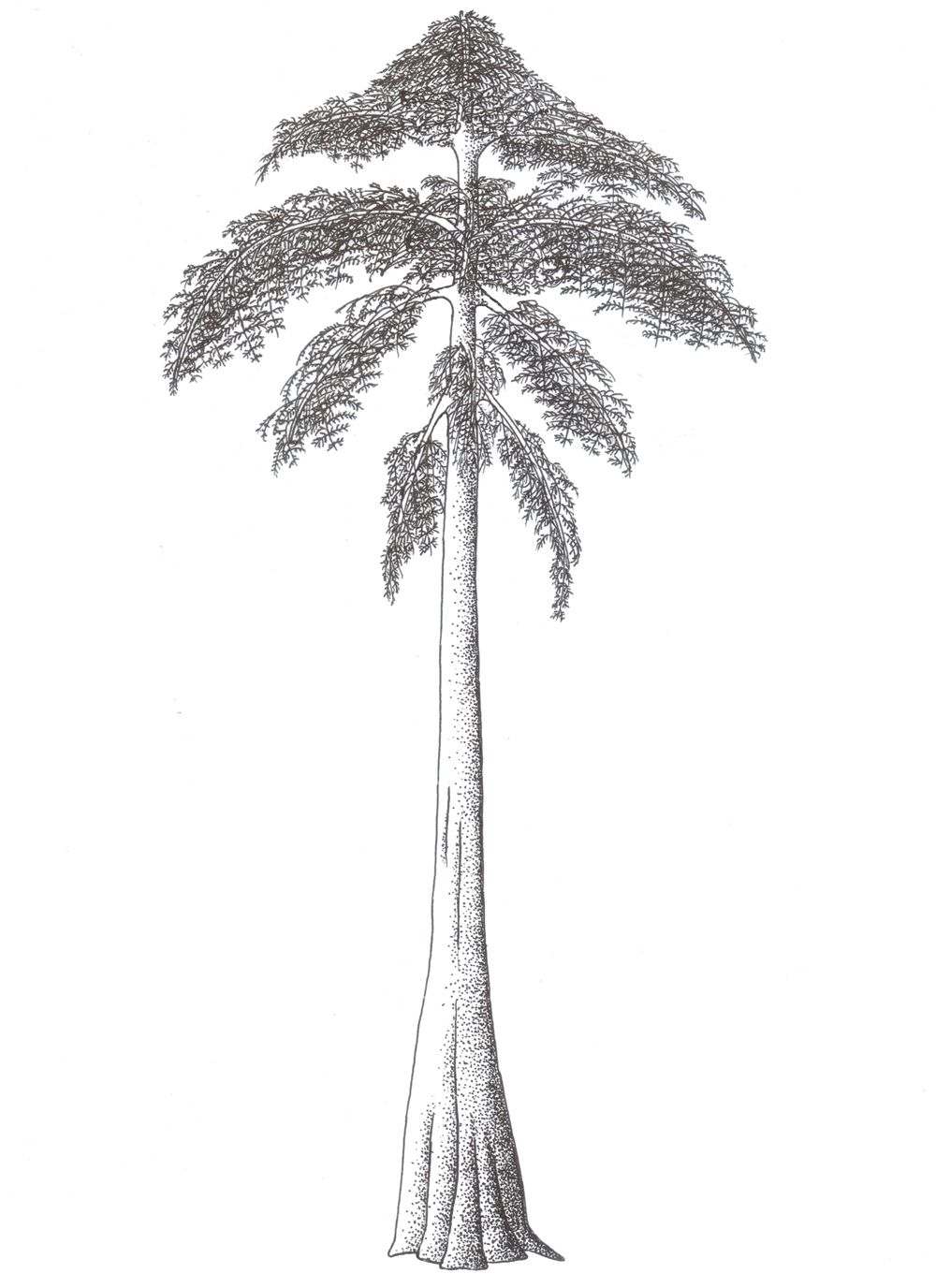
Archaeopteris sp.

== See also ==
- List of fossiliferous stratigraphic units in Latvia
- List of fossil sites
- Gauja National Park
- Gauja valley
- Gauja River
