= Hans-Peter Schultze =

German-American paleoichthyologist (born 1937)

Hans-Peter Schultze (born 13 August 1937 in Swinemünde, Poland) is a German-American paleoichthyologist.

He has described the following taxon:

- Luckeus abudda Young & Schultze, 2005

== See also ==
- Ichthyolith
- Paleozoology
