= 2010 in paleoichthyology =

== Fishes ==
=== Newly named jawless vertebrates ===
Name	Status	Authors	Age	Unit	Location	Notes	Images
Arctictenaspis	Valid	Elliott & Blieck	Devonian	Peel Sound Formation	Canada	A member of Ctenaspidae. The type species is "Ctenaspis" obruchevi Dineley (1976); genus also includes "Ctenaspis" russelli Dineley (1976) and "Ctenaspis" ornata Dineley (1976).	
Ariaspis arctata	Valid	Elliott; Swift	Late Silurian		Canada	A heterostracan.	
Zaphoctenaspis	Valid	Elliott & Blieck	Devonian (Emsian)	Sevy Dolomite	United States	A member of Ctenaspidae. The type species is Z. meemannae.	

=== Newly named placoderms ===
Name	Status	Authors	Age	Unit	Location	Notes	Images
Bryantolepis williamsi	Valid	Elliott & Carr	Early Devonian	Water Canyon Formation	United States	A member of Arthrodira, a species of Bryantolepis.	
Dolganosteus	Valid	Mark-Kurik	Early Devonian		Russia	A member of Rhenanida. Genus includes new species D. remotus.	
Merimbulaspis	Valid	Young	Devonian		Australia	A member of Antiarchi belonging to the group Asterolepidoidei. Genus includes new species M. meemannae.	
Potangaspis	Valid	Zhu Min; Wang Jun-qing; Wang Shi-tao	early Emsian (Early Devonian)	Yukiang Formation	China	An antarctaspid arthrodire. The species is P. parvoculatus.	

=== Newly named cartilaginous fishes ===
Name	Status	Authors	Age	Unit	Location	Notes	Images
Akaimia	Valid	Rees	Callovian – Oxfordian	Ogrodzieniec	Poland	A primitive carpet shark.	
Avonacanthus	Valid	Maisey	Early Carboniferous		United Kingdom	A member of Elasmobranchii, possibly a heslerodid; a new genus for "Ctenacanthus" brevis Agassiz (1837).	
Cretorectolobus robustus	Valid	Underwood; Cumbaa	Cenomanian		Canada		
Denaea saltsmani	Valid	Ginter; Hansen	Carboniferous (Pennsylvanian)		United States	A member of Symmoriiformes, possibly a member of Stethacanthidae; a species of Denaea.	
Denaea williamsi	Valid	Ginter; Hansen	Carboniferous (late Mississippian)		Poland; Russia; United Kingdom; United States	A member of Symmoriiformes, possibly a member of Stethacanthidae; a species of Denaea.	
Edaphodon hesperis	Valid	Shin	Campanian	Haslam Formation	Canada	A holocephalan, a species of Edaphodon.	
Eoscymnus	Valid	Herman; Van Den Eeckhaut	Late Cretaceous (Maastrichtian) to Eocene		Belgium; France; Morocco; United States	An eoscymnid squaliform. The type species is Eoscymnus anthonisi.	
Eostriatolamia paucicorrugata	Valid	Underwood; Cumbaa	Cenomanian		Canada		
Foumtizia deschutteri	Valid	Herman; Van Den Eeckhaut	Eocene		Belgium	A catshark or a houndshark, a species of Foumtizia.	
Jiaodontus	Valid	Klug; Tütken; et al. (Note: Klug, Tütken, Wings, Pfretzschner, Martin.)	Oxfordian	Qigu Formation	China	A lonchidiid hybodontiform.	
Meristodonoides	Valid	Underwood; Cumbaa	Aptian to Maastrichtian		Canada USA	A new genus for "Hybodus" rajkovichi (Case, 2001). Other species included in this genus are: "Hybodus" butleri (Thurmond, 1971), "Hybodus" montanensis (Case, 1978) and "Hybodus" novojerseyensis (Case and Cappetta, 2004).	
Orectoloboides angulatus	Valid	Underwood; Cumbaa	Cenomanian		Canada		
Orectoloboides gijseni	Valid	Herman; Van Den Eeckhaut	Eocene		Belgium	A wobbegong.	
Palaeogenotodus	Junior synonym	Herman; Van Den Eeckhaut	Early Cretaceous (Albian) to Eocene (Ypresian)		Angola; Belgium; France; Morocco; United Kingdom	Initially thought to be an eoptolamnid lamniform, subsequently assigned to Otodontidae. The type species is Paleogenotodus luypaertsi. Herman and Van Waes (2012) considered the genus Palaeogenotodus to be a synonym of the genus Otodus; the authors retained the type species P. luypaertsi as a distinct species within the genus Otodus.	
Palaeoxyris friessi	Valid	Böttcher	Ladinian	Erfurt Formation	Germany	Egg capsule of a probable hybodont shark.	
Ptychodus rhombodus	Valid	Underwood; Cumbaa	Cenomanian		Canada		
Roulletia canadensis	Valid	Underwood; Cumbaa	Cenomanian		Canada		
Telodontaspis	Valid	Underwood; Cumbaa	Cenomanian		Canada	The type species is Telodontaspis agassizensis. Newbrey et al. (2013) considered this genus to be a junior synonym of the genus Cretoxyrhina, though they maintained the species T. agassizensis as a separate species within the genus Cretoxyrhina.	
Titanonarke	Valid	de Carvalho	Eocene	Monte Bolca	Italy	An electric ray. The type species is "Narcine" molini Jaekel (1894).	
Triaenodon willei	Valid	Herman; Van Den Eeckhaut	Eocene		Belgium	A relative of the whitetip reef shark.	
Urobatis molleni	Valid	Hovestadt; Hovestadt-Euler	Eocene (Ypresian to early Lutetian)	Aalter Formation	Belgium	A stingray, a species of Urobatis.	
Welcommia cappettai	Valid	Klug; Kriwet	Middle Oxfordian		Germany	A synechodontiform shark, a species of Welcommia.	

=== Newly named bony fishes ===
Name	Status	Authors	Age	Unit	Location	Notes	Images
Acanthocepola sicca	Sp. nov	Schwarzhans	Miocene		Germany; Netherlands	A bandfish, a species of Acanthocepola.	
Alaconger	Gen. et sp. et comb. nov	Schwarzhans	Late Cretaceous (Maastrichtian) to Eocene		France; Germany	A member of Congridae. The type species is Alaconger triquetrus; genus also contains A. eocaenicus (Sulc, 1932).	
Amblyeleotris radwanskaae	Sp. nov	Schwarzhans	Miocene		Austria	A goby, a species of Amblyeleotris.	
Ampheristus brevicauda	Sp. nov	Schwarzhans	Late Cretaceous (Maastrichtian)		Germany	A cusk-eel, a species of Ampheristus.	
Ampheristus traunensis	Sp. nov	Schwarzhans	Late Cretaceous (Maastrichtian)		Germany	A cusk-eel, a species of Ampheristus.	
Aphia weinbrechti	Sp. nov	Schwarzhans	Miocene		Germany	A relative of the transparent goby.	
Archaeotetraodon bannikovi	Valid	Carnevale & Tyler	Miocene		Italy	A member of Tetraodontidae, a species of Archaeotetraodon.	
Archaeotetraodon dicarloi	Valid	Carnevale & Tyler	Miocene		Italy	A member of Tetraodontidae, a species of Archaeotetraodon.	
Archaeotetraodon zafaranai	Valid	Carnevale & Tyler	Miocene		Italy	A member of Tetraodontidae, a species of Archaeotetraodon.	
Archaulopus	Gen. et sp. nov	Schwarzhans	Late Cretaceous (Maastrichtian)		Germany	A greeneye. The type species is Archaulopus acutus.	
Argentina voigti	Sp. nov	Schwarzhans	Late Cretaceous (Maastrichtian)		Germany	A herring smelt, a species of Argentina.	
Argyroberyx	Gen. et comb. nov	Schwarzhans	Late Cretaceous (Maastrichtian)		Austria; Germany; United States?	A relative of spinyfins. A new genus for "Otolithus (Ganoidarum)" dentatus Liebus (1927); genus might also contain "? Caproidarum" dockeryi Nolf & Stringer (1996).	
Ateleopus ariejansseni	Sp. nov	Schwarzhans	Miocene		Netherlands	A jellynose fish, a species of Ateleopus.	
Ateleopus nolfi	Sp. nov	Schwarzhans	Miocene		Belgium	A jellynose fish, a species of Ateleopus.	
Atlantoceratodus patagonicus	Valid	Agnolin	Late Cretaceous (Campanian or Maastrichtian)	Allen Formation	Argentina	A lungfish, a species of Atlantoceratodus.	
Auriculithus	Gen. et sp. nov	Schwarzhans	Late Cretaceous (Maastrichtian)		Germany	A member of Sternoptychidae. The type species is Auriculithus pattersoni.	
Bannikovperca	Gen. et sp. nov	Taverne	Late Cretaceous (Campanian-Maastrichrian boundary)		Italy	Initially classified as a member of Perciformes of uncertain phylogenetic placement, possibly a member of Percoidei; subsequently reinterpreted as a slimehead. The type species is Bannikovperca apula.	
Bathycongrus teredophilus	Sp. nov	Schwarzhans	Miocene		Germany; Poland	A member of Congridae, a species of Bathycongrus.	
Bathyuroconger sincerus	Sp. nov	Schwarzhans	Miocene		Netherlands	A member of Congridae, a species of Bathyuroconger.	
Bavariconger	Gen. et sp. nov	Schwarzhans	Late Cretaceous (Maastrichtian) to Paleocene (Thanetian)		Austria; Germany	A member of Congridae. The type species is Bavariconger pollerspoecki.	
Bavariscopelus	Gen. et sp. et comb. nov	Schwarzhans	Late Cretaceous (Santonian to Maastrichtian) to Paleocene		Denmark; France; Germany; Spain	Originally considered to be a lanternfish; subsequently only classified as a member of Myctophiformes of uncertain phylogenetic placement by Schwarzhans (2012). The type species is Bavariscopelus bispinosus; genus also contains "genus Apogonidarum" vetustus Nolf (2003).	
Beauryia	Gen. et sp. et comb? nov	Schwarzhans	Late Cretaceous (Maastrichtian)		Germany; Austria?	A relative of spinyfins. The type species is Beauryia medialis; genus might also contain ? B. obovatus (Liebus, 1927) from the Late Cretaceous (Campanian-Maastrichtian) of Carinthia.	
Bellwoodilabrus	Valid	Bannikov; Carnevale	Eocene (late Ypresian)	Monte Bolca locality	Italy	A wrasse. The type species is Bellwoodilabrus landinii.	
Blennius dividatus	Sp. nov	Schwarzhans	Miocene		Germany	A combtooth blenny, a species of Blennius.	
Bollmannia nubila	Sp. nov	Schwarzhans	Miocene		Germany	A goby, a species of Bollmannia.	
Bonnerichthys	Valid	Friedman; Shimada; et al. (Note: Friedman, Shimada, Martin, Everhart, Liston, Maltese, Triebold.)	Cenomanian	Niobrara Chalk Formation	USA	A gigantic pachycormid fish, a new genus for "Portheus" gladius (Cope, 1873).	
Bullichthys	Valid	Mayrinck; Brito; Otero	Lower Cretaceous	Santana Formation	Brazil	An albuliform fish. The species is B. santanensis.	
Cataetyx cautus	Sp. nov	Schwarzhans	Miocene		Netherlands	A viviparous brotula, a species of Cataetyx.	
Caucasiganus	Gen. et sp. nov	Bannikov; Tyler; Sorbini	Eocene (Bartonian) and early Oligocene		Iran; Russia	A rabbitfish. The type species is Caucasiganus eocaenicus from the Eocene of Russia; genus also includes second, unnamed species from the early Oligocene of Iran.	
Chelidonichthys mistensis	Sp. nov	Schwarzhans	Miocene		Germany; Netherlands	A smallscaled gurnard.	
Ciliata crimmeni	Sp. nov	Schwarzhans	Miocene		Germany	A member of Lotidae, a species of Ciliata.	
Coelorinchus supramedianus	Sp. nov	Schwarzhans	Miocene		Germany	A grenadier, a species of Coelorinchus.	
Deltentosteus eggenburgensis	Sp. nov	Schwarzhans	Miocene		Austria	A goby, a species of Deltentosteus.	
Diaphus extremus	Sp. nov	Schwarzhans	Miocene		Germany	A lanternfish, a species of Diaphus.	
Diaphus guersi	Sp. nov	Schwarzhans	Miocene		Germany	A lanternfish, a species of Diaphus.	
Diaphus simplex	Sp. nov	Schwarzhans	Miocene		Denmark; Germany	A lanternfish, a species of Diaphus.	
Dibranchus auriculatus	Sp. nov	Schwarzhans	Miocene		Germany	A member of Ogcocephalidae, a species of Dibranchus.	
Diretmus primus	Sp. nov	Schwarzhans	Late Cretaceous (Maastrichtian)		Germany	A spinyfin related to the silver spinyfin.	
Encheliophis woltrupensis	Sp. nov	Schwarzhans	Miocene		Germany; Netherlands	A pearlfish, a species of Encheliophis.	
Enchodus zimapanensis	Valid	Fielitz; González-Rodríguez	Albian to Cenomanian	El Doctor Formation	Mexico	An enchodontid aulopiform, a species of Enchodus.	
Engyophrys arnoldmuelleri	Sp. nov	Schwarzhans	Miocene		Germany	A member of Bothidae, a species of Engyophrys.	
Gadichthys serratus	Sp. nov	Schwarzhans	Miocene		Denmark; Germany	A member of Gadidae, a species of Gadichthys.	
Gadichthys syltensis abruptus	Subsp. nov	Schwarzhans	Miocene		Germany	A member of Gadidae, a subspecies of Gadichthys syltensis.	
Gadiculus deurnensis compactus	Subsp. nov	Schwarzhans	Miocene		Germany	A member of Gadidae, a subspecies of Gadiculus deurnensis.	
Gadiculus deurnensis macer	Subsp. nov	Schwarzhans	Miocene		Germany	A member of Gadidae, a subspecies of Gadiculus deurnensis.	
Gobius rudis	Sp. nov	Schwarzhans	Miocene		Germany	A goby, a species of Gobius.	
Gobius simplicissimus	Sp. nov	Schwarzhans	Miocene		Germany	A goby, a species of Gobius.	
Gobius tenuisulcus	Sp. nov	Schwarzhans	Miocene		Germany	A goby, a species of Gobius.	
Gymnogeophagus eocenicus	Valid	Malabarba, Malabarba & Del Papa	Eocene	Lumbrera Formation	Argentina	A cichlid, a species of Gymnogeophagus.	
"genus Hemiramphidarum" insolitus	Sp. nov	Schwarzhans	Miocene		Germany	A halfbeak of uncertain generic assignment.	
Holocentronotus	Gen. et sp. et comb. nov	Schwarzhans	Late Cretaceous (Maastrichtian) to Eocene		Germany; New Zealand	A member of Holocentridae. The type species is Holocentronotus percomorphus; genus also contains H. palasulcatus (Schwarzhans 1980), H. ventriosus (Schwarzhans 1980) and H. amplus (Schwarzhans 1980), all from the Eocene of New Zealand.	
Hoplobrotula tenuinotata	Sp. nov	Schwarzhans	Miocene		Germany	A cusk-eel, a species of Hoplobrotula.	
Hoplunnis massivus	Sp. nov	Schwarzhans	Miocene		Netherlands	A member of Nettastomatidae, a species of Hoplunnis.	
Hygophum brzobohatyi	Sp. nov	Schwarzhans	Miocene		Germany	A lanternfish, a species of Hygophum.	
Hyporhamphus ronaldjansseni	Sp. nov	Schwarzhans	Miocene		Germany	A halfbeak, a species of Hyporhamphus.	
Isozen	Gen. et sp. et comb. nov	Schwarzhans	Late Cretaceous (late Santonian to Maastrichtian) to Paleocene		Denmark; France; Germany	A member of Zeiformes of uncertain phylogenetic placement, related to the family Parazenidae. The type species is Isozen beateae; genus also contains "genus Zeiformorum" tyleri Nolf 2003 and "genus Zeiformorum" janni Schwarzhans (2003).	
Johnsonperca	Gen. et sp. nov	Taverne	Late Cretaceous (Campanian-Maastrichrian boundary)		Italy	A member of Perciformes of uncertain phylogenetic placement, possibly a member of Percoidei. The type species is Johnsonperca annavaccarii.	
Kathetostoma drusianus	Sp. nov	Schwarzhans	Miocene		Netherlands	A stargazer, a species of Kathetostoma.	
Kokenichthys	Gen. et comb. nov	Schwarzhans	Late Cretaceous (Maastrichtian)		Germany; United States	A member of Osteoglossiformes of uncertain phylogenetic placement; a new genus for "genus ? Albulidarum" ensis Nolf & Dockery (1990).	
Lagosiganus	Gen. et sp. nov	Bannikov; Tyler; Sorbini	Eocene (Bartonian)	Kuma Horizon	Russia	A rabbitfish. The type species is Lagosiganus parinterneuralis.	
Lamprogrammus joergennielseni	Sp. nov	Schwarzhans	Miocene		Germany	A cusk-eel, a species of Lamprogrammus.	
Lavinia lugaskii	Valid	Kelly	Middle Miocene (early Clarendonian)	Aldrich Station Formation	United States	A cyprinid fish, a species of Lavinia.	
Lepidotrigla dingdenensis	Sp. nov	Schwarzhans	Miocene		Germany	A sea robin, a species of Lepidotrigla.	
Lepidotrigla modica	Sp. nov	Schwarzhans	Miocene		Germany; Netherlands	A sea robin, a species of Lepidotrigla.	
Lepidotrigla necrophagus	Sp. nov	Schwarzhans	Miocene		Germany	A sea robin, a species of Lepidotrigla.	
Lepidotrigla vierlandica	Sp. nov	Schwarzhans	Miocene		Germany	A sea robin, a species of Lepidotrigla.	
Macropycnodon	Valid	Shimada; Williamson; Sealey	Upper Cretaceous	Mancos Shale Formation	USA	A gigantic pycnodont fish.	
Magnigena	Valid	Forey & Hilton	Paleocene	Umm Himar Formation	Saudi Arabia	An arowana. Genus includes new species M. arabica.	
Microgadus ipswichensis	Sp. nov	Schwarzhans	Middle Pliocene		United Kingdom	A member of Gadidae, a species of Microgadus.	
Mesobius lohneensis	Sp. nov	Schwarzhans	Miocene		Germany	A grenadier, a species of Mesobius.	
Morone exercitus	Sp. nov	Schwarzhans	Miocene		Denmark; Germany	A temperate bass, a species of Morone.	
Morone sororius	Sp. nov	Schwarzhans	Miocene		Denmark; Germany	A temperate bass, a species of Morone.	
Myrichthys valens	Sp. nov	Schwarzhans	Miocene		Germany; Netherlands	A member of Ophichthidae, a species of Myrichthys.	
Nigerium tamaguelense	Sp. nov	Longbottom	Early Eocene		Mali	A catfish belonging to the family Claroteidae.	
Notoscopelus ostiolatus	Sp. nov	Schwarzhans	Miocene		Germany	A lanternfish, a species of Notoscopelus.	
Oblada torneschensis	Sp. nov	Schwarzhans	Miocene		Germany	A relative of the saddled seabream.	
Oliganodon	Gen. et comb. nov	Bannikov	Oligocene		Abkhazia; Azerbaijan; Czech Republic; France; Germany; Hungary; Poland; Romania; Russia; Ukraine	A member of Percoidei. Genus includes "Smerdis" budensis Heckel (1856) and "Serranus" comparabilis Daniltshenko (1960). However, Prokofiev (2009) already established a new genus Oligoserranoides for these two species.	
Orrichthys	Valid	Carnevale & Pietsch	Eocene (Ypresian)	Monte Bolca locality	Italy	A handfish. The type species is Orrichthys longimanus.	
Owstonia badenensis	Sp. nov	Schwarzhans	Miocene		Austria	A bandfish, a species of Owstonia.	
Pagrus vandornicki	Sp. nov	Schwarzhans	Miocene		Netherlands	A member of Sparidae, a species of Pagrus.	
Palaeostomias	Gen. et sp. nov	Schwarzhans	Late Cretaceous (Maastrichtian)		Germany	A relative of barbeled dragonfishes of uncertain phylogenetic placement. The type species is Palaeostomias praematurus.	
Pampus pampauensis	Sp. nov	Schwarzhans	Miocene		Germany	A member of Stromateidae, a species of Pampus.	
Pampus uedemensis	Sp. nov	Schwarzhans	Miocene		Germany	A member of Stromateidae, a species of Pampus.	
Paralichthys transatlanticus	Sp. nov	Schwarzhans	Miocene		Germany	A member of Paralichthyidae, a species of Paralichthys.	
Parascombrops malzi	Sp. nov	Schwarzhans	Miocene		Denmark; Germany; Netherlands	A member of Acropomatidae, a species of Parascombrops.	
"genus aff. Parascombrops" postgeron	Sp. nov	Schwarzhans	Miocene		Germany; Netherlands	A member of Acropomatidae related to members of the genus Parascombrops.	
Paratrisopterus glaber	Sp. nov	Schwarzhans	Miocene		Germany	A member of Gadidae, a species of Paratrisopterus.	
Peprilus hoedemakersi	Sp. nov	Schwarzhans	Miocene		Germany; Netherlands	A member of Stromateidae, a species of Peprilus.	
Peristedion menzeli	Sp. nov	Schwarzhans	Miocene		Germany	An armored searobin, a species of Peristedion.	
Pfeilichthys	Gen. et sp. nov	Schwarzhans	Late Cretaceous (Maastrichtian)		Germany	A relative of members of the family Holocentridae. The type species is Pfeilichthys pfeili.	
Pisodonophis cetacephalus	Sp. nov	Schwarzhans	Miocene		Germany; Netherlands	A member of Ophichthidae, a species of Pisodonophis.	
Plesioheros	Valid	Perez, Malabarba & Del Papa	Eocene	Lumbrera Formation	Argentina	A cichlid belonging to the tribe Heroini. The type species is P. chauliodus.	
Plesiopoma	Gen. et sp. et comb. nov	Schwarzhans	Late Cretaceous (Coniacian to Maastrichtian)		Austria; France; Germany; Spain	A member of Acropomatidae. The type species is Plesiopoma otiosa; genus also contains P. anhaltinus (Voigt, 1926), P. weinbergeri (Sieber & Weinfurter, 1967) and P. bilottei (Nolf, 2003).	
Polazzodus	Valid	Poyoto-Ariza	Late Cretaceous		Italy	A pycnodont fish. The species is P. coronatus.	
Pollerspoeckia	Gen. et sp. et comb. nov	Schwarzhans	Late Cretaceous (Turonian to Maastrichtian)		Germany; Spain; United Kingdom	A relative of members of the genus Pterothrissus. The type species is Pollerspoeckia siegsdorfensis; genus also contains P. rotunda (Stinton, 1973) and P. bagassianus (Nolf, 2003).	
"genus Polymixiidarum" beauryi	Sp. nov	Schwarzhans	Late Cretaceous (Maastrichtian)		Germany	A Polymixiidae. Assigned to the genus Cowetaichthys by Schwarzhans, Huddleston & Takeuchi (2018).	
Pomatoschistus flensburgensis	Sp. nov	Schwarzhans	Miocene		Germany	A goby, a species of Pomatoschistus.	
Ponticola wiesenensis	Sp. nov	Schwarzhans	Miocene		Austria	A goby, a species of Ponticola.	
Potamoceratodus	Valid	Pardo; Huttenlocker; et al. (Note: Pardo, Huttenlocker, Small, Gorman II.)	Late Jurassic	Morrison Formation	USA	A lungfish, a new genus for "Ceratodus" guentheri (Marsh, 1878).	
Prionotus chamavensis	Sp. nov	Schwarzhans	Miocene		Netherlands	A sea robin, a species of Prionotus.	
Prionotus europaeus	Sp. nov	Schwarzhans	Miocene		Germany	A sea robin, a species of Prionotus.	
Pristigenys hermani	Valid	Taverne; Nolf	Middle Eocene		Belgium	A priacanthid, a species of Pristigenys.	
Pristigenys schiecki	Sp. nov	Schwarzhans	Miocene		Germany	A priacanthid, a species of Pristigenys.	
Protobathylagus	Gen. et sp. nov	Schwarzhans	Late Cretaceous (Maastrichtian)		Germany	A deep-sea smelt. The type species is Protobathylagus effusus.	
Protobythites	Gen. et sp. nov	Schwarzhans	Late Cretaceous (Maastrichtian)		Germany; United States	A cusk-eel. The type species is Protobythites brzobohatyi.	
Pteralbula foreyi	Sp. nov	Schwarzhans	Late Cretaceous (Maastrichtian)		Germany; United States?	Originally described as a species of Pteralbula, but subsequently transferred to the genus Pterothrissus.	
Qingmenodus	Gen. et sp. nov	Lu; Zhu	Devonian (late Pragian)	Posongchong Formation	China	A member of Onychodontida. The type species is Q. yui.	
Rhinconichthys	Valid	Friedman; Shimada; et al.	Cenomanian		Japan; UK	A gigantic pachycormid fish. The species is Rhinconichthys taylori	
Rhinonemus gaemersi	Sp. nov	Schwarzhans	Miocene		Germany	A member of Lotidae, a species of Rhinonemus.	
Rhombichthys	Valid	Khalloufi; Zaragueta-Bagils; Lelievre	Cenomanian	Ein Yabrud	West Bank	A double-armored member of the Ellimmichthyiformes.	
Rhynchoconger accentuatus	Sp. nov	Schwarzhans	Miocene		Netherlands	A member of Congridae, a species of Rhynchoconger.	
"genus aff. Rhynchoconger" piger	Sp. nov	Schwarzhans	Late Cretaceous (Maastrichtian)		Germany; United States	A member of Congridae related to members of the genus Rhynchoconger.	
Robinsondipterus	Valid	Long	Late Devonian	Gogo Formation	Australia	A holodontid lungfish. The type species is "Holodipterus" longi Campbell & Barwick (1991).	
Saccogaster vonderhochti	Sp. nov	Schwarzhans	Miocene		Germany	A viviparous brotula, a species of Saccogaster.	
Sciaena abotrita	Sp. nov	Schwarzhans	Miocene		Germany	A member of Sciaenidae, a species of Sciaena.	
Sciaena achimensis	Sp. nov	Schwarzhans	Miocene		Germany	A member of Sciaenidae, a species of Sciaena.	
Sciaenops cimbricus	Sp. nov	Schwarzhans	Miocene		Germany	A member of Sciaenidae, a species of Sciaenops.	
Shuleichthys	Valid	Murry; You; Peng	Cretaceous		China	A osteoglossomorph fish. The species is S. brachypteryx.	
Sillaginocentrus	Gen. et sp. nov	Schwarzhans	Late Cretaceous (Maastrichtian)		Germany	A relative of members of the family Holocentridae. The type species is Sillaginocentrus alienus.	
Solea ijsselanus	Sp. nov	Schwarzhans	Miocene		Germany; Netherlands	A member of Soleidae, a species of Solea.	
Solea wolfi	Sp. nov	Schwarzhans	Miocene		Germany	A member of Soleidae, a species of Solea.	
Trachinus wettenensis	Sp. nov	Schwarzhans	Miocene		Germany	A weever, a species of Trachinus.	
Traubiella	Gen. et sp. nov	Schwarzhans	Late Cretaceous (Maastrichtian)		Germany	A relative of members of the family Holocentridae. The type species is Traubiella anagoformis.	
Traunichthys	Gen. et sp. nov	Schwarzhans	Late Cretaceous (Maastrichtian)		Germany	A possible relative of ridgeheads. The type species is Traunichthys pfeili.	
Trigla vandervoorti	Sp. nov	Schwarzhans	Miocene		Germany	A relative of the piper gurnard.	
Triglopsis chaucensis	Sp. nov	Schwarzhans	Miocene		Germany; Netherlands	A member of Cottidae, a species of Triglopsis.	
Xeradipterus	Valid	Clement; Long	Late Devonian (Frasnian)	Gogo Formation	Australia	A holodontid lungfish.	
Zeugopterus martinii	Sp. nov	Schwarzhans	Miocene		Germany; Netherlands	A member of Scophthalmidae, a species of Zeugopterus.	
Zorzinperca	Gen. et sp. nov	Taverne	Late Cretaceous (Campanian-Maastrichrian boundary)		Italy	A member of Perciformes belonging to the group Percoidei, a relative of Nardoichthys. The type species is Zorzinperca weverberghi.	
