= Alfred Post =

Alfred Post may refer to:

- Alfred Charles Post (1806–1886), American surgeon
- Alfred Post (footballer) (1926–2013), German footballer
- Alfred Post (zoologist); see Diretmoides
- Alfred M. Post (1847–1923), Justice of the Nebraska Supreme Court
