= Dulcie Sandstone =

Devonian geologic formation in Northern Territory, Australia

- Stratigraphic range: Early–Late Devonian (Emsian–Frasnian) 410.62–372.15 Ma
- Type: Geological formation
- Unit of: Georgina Basin
- Underlies: Unconformity with Cenozoic sediments
- Overlies: Unconformity with mid to lower Ordovician and upper Cambrian sequences
- Thickness: 622 m (2,041 ft) (Type section)

Lithology
- Primary: Sandstone
- Other: Conglomerate, siltstone

Location
- Location: Central Desert Region, Northern Territory
- Coordinates: 22.583333°S 135.683333°E (Type section)
- Region: Northern Territory
- Country: Australia
- Extent: Georgina Basin
- Dulcie Sandstone (Australia) Dulcie Sandstone (Northern Territory)

The Dulcie Sandstone is a fossil-bearing geological formation located within the Dulcie Syncline in the Northern Territory, Australia. It dates from the early to late Devonian period, between 410 and 372 million years ago.

Its rocks consist of two separate faunal assemblages, the lower section, which is very similar to the Wuttagoonaspis assemblage of the Cravens Peak Beds, as well as exclusive taxa such as the phyllolepid Austrophyllolepis dulciensis, although this species was found 200 metres (660 ft) stratigraphically above the assemblage.

== Description ==
The Dulcie Sandstone primarily consists of medium to thick cross-bedded quartz arenite, with are occasional beds made up of calcareous silty sandstone, white siltstone and conglomerate of a pebbly nature. The formation has been subdivided into two strata, based on aerial photographical interpretation; the lower (Dud1) and upper (Dud2) sections. The lower facies is less resistant to erosion and is probably clay-cemented. It is exposed as a series of thinner beds, which are separated by more worn rock. The upper facies is possibly silica-cemented and is notably more resistant. It is composed of thicker, more pronounced beds which form escarpments that reach up to 50 metres (160 ft) high. The sedimentary layers of the Dulcie Sandstone suggest braided fluviatile and continental aeolian environments.

The thickness varies from section to section:

- 622m at type section (13 km southeast Huckitta homestead)
- 520m northwest of Picton Spring
- >450m in northeast of Grg 1
- >450m in southern part of Barrow Creek Sheet area
- 100m in northwest end of the Dulcie Syncline
- <40m along most of the northeastern stretch of the Dulcie Syncline

== Paleobiota ==
=== Placodermi ===
Placoderms of the Dulcie Sandstone
Genus	Species	Stratigraphic position	Clade	Images
Austrophyllolepis	A. dulciensis	Lower	Arthrodira, Phyllolepidae	Reconstruction of the Victorian species A. ritchei.
Austrophyllolepis	A. sp.	Upper	Arthrodira, Phyllolepidae	Reconstruction of the Victorian species A. ritchei.
Cravenaspis	C. trematosus	Lower	Arthrodira, Phlyctaeniidae	
Huginaspis	H. australis	Lower	Arthrodira, Phlyctaeniidae	
Lurapullaspis	L. johannseni	Lower	Arthrodira, Bulbocanthidae	
Mithakaspis	M. lyentye	Lower	Arthrodira, Groenlandaspididae	
Placolepis	P. sp.	Upper	Arthrodira, Phyllolepididae	
Tokolepis	T. ulpe	Lower	Arthrodira, Phlyctaeniidae	
Toombalepis	T. tuberculata	Lower	Arthrodira, Antarctaspidae	
Wuttagoonaspis	W. milligani	Lower	Arthrodira, Wuttagoonaspidae	Restoration of the related W. fletcheri.
Groenlandaspis	cf. G. sp. 1	Lower	Arthrodira, Groenlandaspididae	Reconstruction of the related G. pennsylvanica.
Groenlandaspid indet.	sp. indet.	Lower	Arthrodira, Groenlandaspididae, incertae sedis	
Petalichthyida indet.	sp.indet.	Lower	Petalichthyida incertae sedis	
Phlyctaenioidei indet.	sp. indet. 1 & 2		Phlyctaenioidei incertae sedis	
Phyllolepida indet.	sp. indet. 3	Upper	Arthrodira, Phyllolepida incertae sedis	

=== Other ===
Other fauna of the Dulcie Sandstone
Genus	Species	Clade	Images
Acanthodii indet.	sp. indet.	Acanthodii, incertae sedis	
Onychodontiformes indet.	sp. indet.	Onychodontiformes, Onychodontidae	
Porolepiformes indet.	sp. indet.	?Porolepiformes, incertae sedis	
Rhizodontida indet.	sp. indet.	?Rhizodontida, incertae sedis	
