= Cravens Peak Beds =

Devonian geologic formation in Queensland, Australia

- Stratigraphic range: Early-Mid Devonian (Emsian–Eifelian) 410.62–387.95 Ma
- Type: Geological formation
- Unit of: Georgina Basin

Lithology
- Primary: Sandstone, conglomerate facies
- Other: Limestone

Location
- Location: Sturt, Queensland
- Coordinates: 23.4°S 138.1°E
- Region: Queensland
- Country: Australia
- Extent: Georgina Basin
- Cravens Peak Beds (Australia) Cravens Peak Beds (Queensland)

The Cravens Peak Beds is a sedimentary geological formation located in western Queensland, near the border with the Northern Territory, Australia. Its sandstone, conglomerate rocks and limestone date to the Early to Middle Devonian period, specifically the Emsian to Eifelian stages. Although it is neither the richest nor the most speciose fossil deposit, the Cravens Peak Beds still preserve a highly endemic biota known as the Wuttagoonaspis fauna, as many genera of the assemblage are not found outside the Georgina Basin, although some of these are also found in the lower Dulcie Sandstone, another geologic formation in the same basin located further west in central Northern Territory. Higher levels of the Dulcie Sandstone, likely of Givetian–Frasnian age, contain younger taxa such as the phyllolepid Austrophyllolepis dulciensis, which is not part of the Wuttagoonaspis fauna.

== History ==
=== Discovery and Early Research (1950s–1970s) ===
Fossilized remains of fishes from the Devonian strata of the Georgina Basin located in central Australia were first discovered in 1958, during the initial geological mapping by the Commonwealth Bureau of Mineral Resources (BMR). Early collections from the Toko/Toomba Range area in the early 1960s were recovered from the eastern part of the Georgina Basin, following surveys by various petroleum exploration companies, but again no published descriptions materialized until geologist/paleontologist Susan Turner described thelodont scales and summarized localities in 1981.

Between 1974 and 1977, two respective field trips were undertaken by Gavin Charles Young, then a geologist/paleontologist at BMR. Because better-preserved material of Wuttagoonaspis was simultaneously being studied from the Mulga Downs Group of New South Wales by Alex Ritchie, research of the Georgina Basin collections was paused, except for specific descriptions of antiarchs (Young, 1984), sharks (Turner & Young, 1987), and agnathans (Young, 1991).

=== Re-examination and Biostratigraphy (1990s–2000s) ===
The lack of a detailed description of the Wuttagoonaspis assemblage presented a significant gap in Australian biostratigraphy. To address this, Young re-examined the prepared Georgina Basin material during a 3-month Visiting Professorship (GCY) at the National Museum of Natural History in Paris alongside Daniel Goujet. This study revealed the presence of closely related Early Devonian fish assemblages from Severnaya Zemlya in Russia, Spitsbergen in Norway, and western United States. This showcased that some components of placoderm fauna were widely distributed, and thus likely to give improved data for age demarcation.

Young then examined the entire collection, containing about 450 samples housed at the Australian Geological Survey Organization (AGSO), Canberra (formerly BMR), during January–February 2001, to compare studied latex casts against rock specimens. This systematic review allowed for a workable framework to map taxon occurrences across individual localities, supporting biostratigraphic age control of subsurface, non-marine Devonian sequences.

== Paleobiota ==
=== Agnatha ===
Agnathans of the Cravens Peak Beds
| Genus | Species | Clade | Images |
|---|---|---|---|
| Gampsolepis | G. sp. | Thelodontiformes, Turiniidae | |
| Neeyambaspis | N. enigmatica | Pituriaspidiformes, Pituriaspididae | Reconstruction of N. enigmatica. |
| Pituriaspis | P. doylei | Pituriaspidiformes, Pituriaspididae | Reconstruction of P. doylei. |
| Turinia | T. australiensis | Thelodontiformes, Turiniidae | A restoration of T. pagei. |
| Turinia | T. gavinyoungi | Thelodontiformes, Turiniidae | A restoration of T. pagei. |

=== Chondrichthyes ===
Chondrichthyans of the Cravens Peak Beds
| Genus | Species | Clade | Images |
|---|---|---|---|
| Machaeracanthus | M. pectinatus | Elasmobranchii, Machaeracanthidae | |
| Maiseyodus | M. whitei | Elasmobranchii, Mcmurdodontidae | |
| Teneracanthus | T. toombaensis | Acanthodiformes, Mesacanthidae | |
| Acanthodii indet. | acanthodian indet. | Acanthodiformes, incertae sedis | |

=== Placodermi ===
Placoderms of the Cravens Peak Beds
| Genus | Species | Clade | Images |
|---|---|---|---|
| Cravenaspis | C. trematosus | Arthrodira, Phlyctaeniidae | |
| Ethabukaspis | E. leios | Arthrodira (incertae sedis) | |
| Groenlandaspis | cf. G. sp. 1 & 2 | Arthrodira, Groenlandaspidae | |
| Huginaspis | H. australis | Arthrodira, Phlyctaeniidae | |
| Lurapullaspis | L. johannseni | Arthrodira, Bulbocanthidae | |
| Mithakaspis | M. lyentye | Arthrodira, Groenlandaspididae | |
| Tnoralaspis | T. petercooki | Arthrodira, Actinolepidoidei incertae sedis | |
| Tokolepis | T. ulpe | Arthrodira, Phlyctaeniidae | |
| Toombalepis | T. tuberculata | Arthrodira, Antarctaspidae | |
| Wuttagoonaspis | W. milligani | Arthrodira, Wuttagoonaspidae | Restoration of the related W. fletcheri. |
| Asterolepidoidei indet. | asterolepidoid indet. | Antiarchi, Asterolepidoidei incertae sedis | |
| Groenlandaspid indet. | groenlandaspid indet. | Arthrodira, Groenlandaspidae incertae sedis | |
| Petalichthyida indet. | petalichthyid indet. | Petalichthyida incertae sedis | |
| Phlyctaenioidei indet. | phlyctaenioid indet. 3 | Phlyctaenioidei incertae sedis | |

=== Other ===
Other vertebrates of the Cravens Peak Beds
| Genus | Species | Clade | Images |
|---|---|---|---|
| Luckeus | L. abudda | Onychodontiformes, Onychodontidae | |
| Onychodontiformes indet. | onychodontiform indet. | Onychodontiformes, Onychodontidae | |
| Palaeospondylus | P. australis | Incertae sedis (Eugnathostomata?) | Image of the related P. gunni. |
| Rhizodontida indet. | rhizodontid indet. | Rhizodontida, incertae sedis | |
