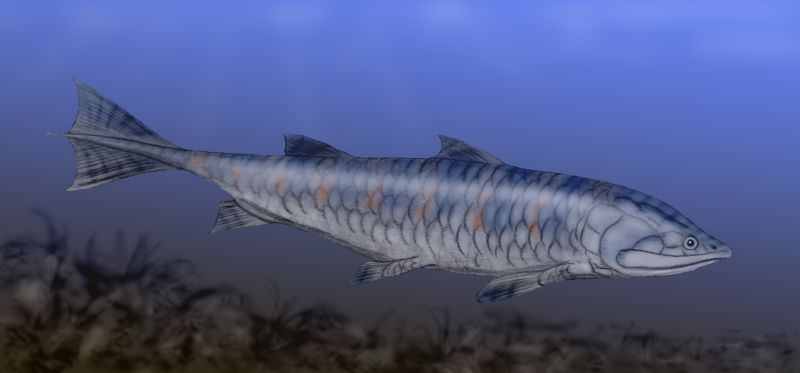

Scientific classification
- Kingdom: Animalia
- Phylum: Chordata
- Order: †Onychodontiformes
- Family: †Onychodontidae
- Genus: †Grossius

Type species
- †Grossius aragonensis Schultze, 1973

= Grossius =

Grossius Temporal range: Middle Devonian

Extinct genus of bony fishes

Grossius is an extinct genus of sarcopterygian fish that lived during the Devonian period of Spain. Its size was about 1 m in length.
