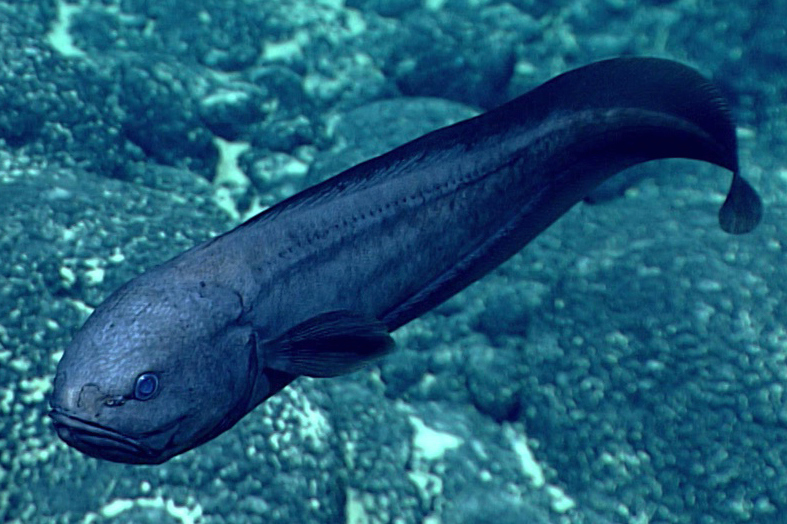

Conservation status
- Least Concern (IUCN 3.1)

Scientific classification
- Kingdom: Animalia
- Phylum: Chordata
- Class: Actinopterygii
- Order: Ophidiiformes
- Family: Ophidiidae
- Genus: Lamprogrammus
- Species: L. brunswigi

Binomial name
- Lamprogrammus brunswigi (Brauer, 1906)

Synonyms
- Bassobythites brunswigi Brauer, 1906; Lamprogrammus macropterus Smith & Radcliffe in Radcliffe, 1913

= Lamprogrammus brunswigi =

Species of Actinopterygii

Lamprogrammus brunswigi is a species of fish in the family Ophidiidae.
