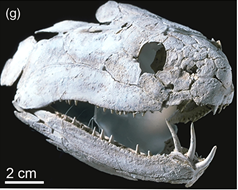
- Holotype skull of Onychodus jandemarrai (Showing single tusk whorl, while actually there should be a pair)
- Skull diagram of Onychodus jandemarrai

Scientific classification
- Kingdom: Animalia
- Phylum: Chordata
- Order: †Onychodontiformes
- Family: †Onychodontidae
- Genus: †Onychodus; Newberry, 1857

Type species
- †Onychodus sigmoides Newberry, 1857

Species
- See text
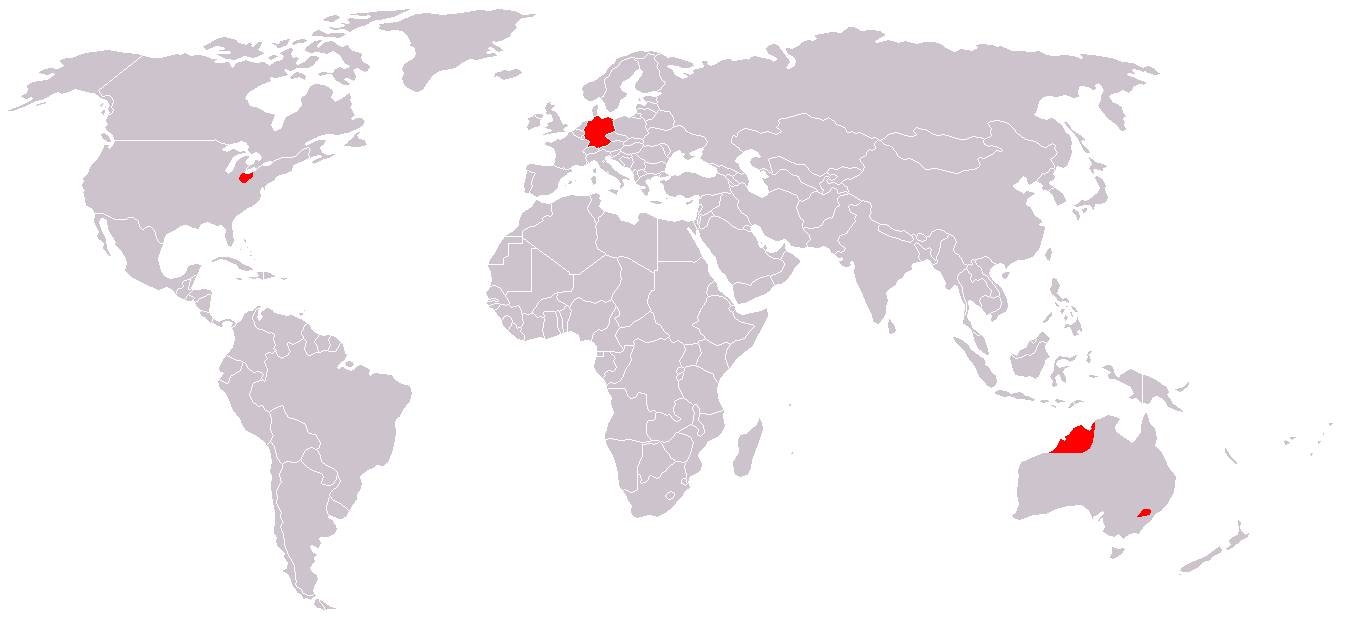
- Localities of known Onychodus fossils

= Onychodus =

Onychodus Temporal range: Eifelian–Famennian Devonian

Extinct genus of bony fishes

Onychodus (/ɒˈnɪkədəs/, from Greek meaning "claw-tooth") is a genus of prehistoric lobe-finned fish which lived during the Devonian Period (Eifelian - Famennian stages, around 374 to 397 million years ago). It is one of the best known of the group of onychodontiform fishes. Scattered fossil teeth of Onychodus were first described from Ohio in 1857 by John Strong Newberry. Other species were found in Australia, England, Norway and Germany showing that it had a widespread range.

Onychodus was about 2 to 4 meters in length and was a pelagic animal. Like other onychodontiformes, it had a pair of tooth spirals (parasymphysial tooth whorls) bearing tusk-like teeth.

The most well-preserved specimen of Onychodus has been found in the Gogo Formation of Western Australia giving palaeontologists more information about the structure of the fish. Other species of Onychodus are known only from poor material based on isolated tusks, teeth and scales.

== Description ==
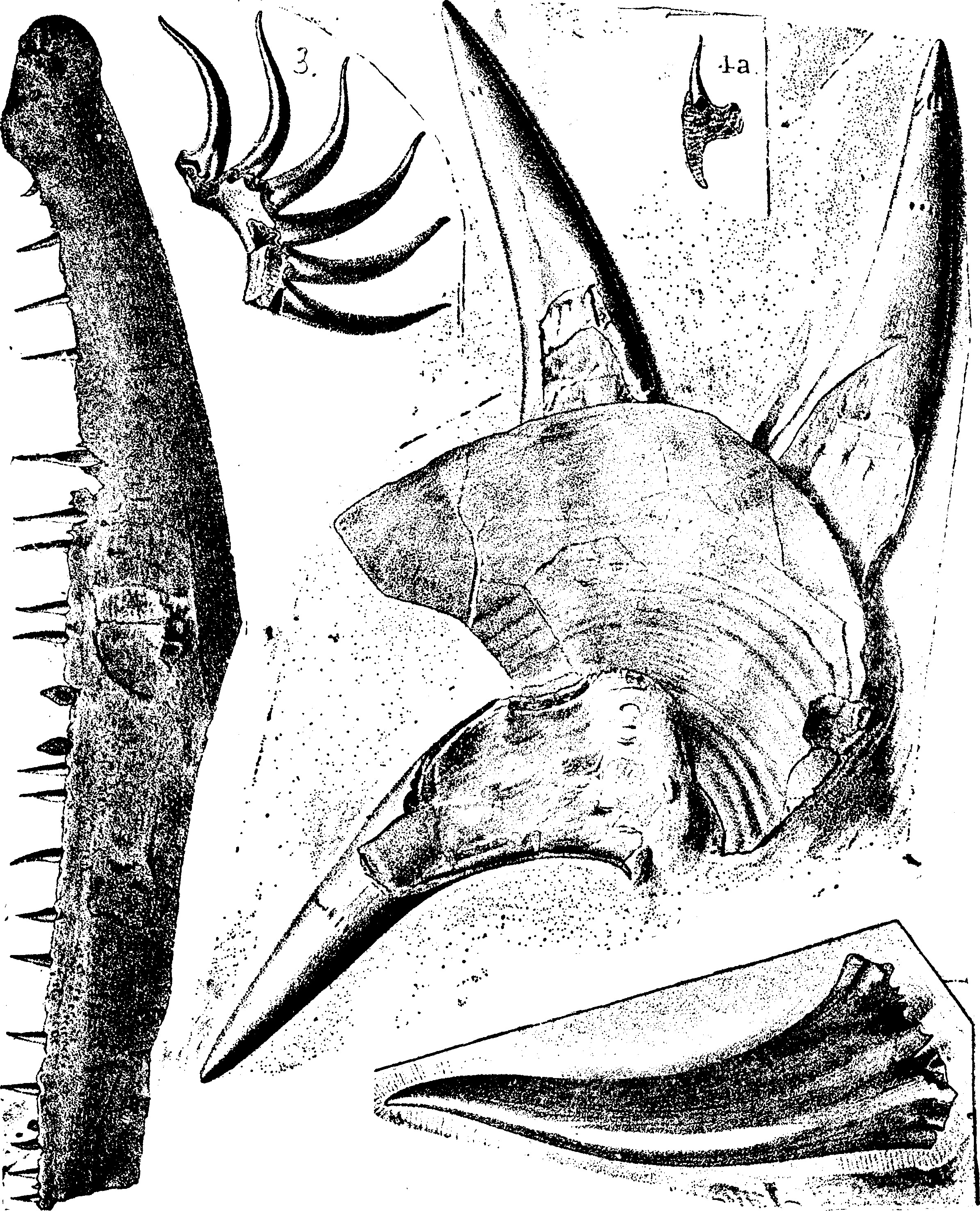
Lower jaw of O. sigmoides

The most characteristic feature is a pair of retractable, laterally compressed tusk whorls at the front of the lower jaw. These were not attached to any other bone, but fit into a pair of deep cavities on the palate and were free to move. The lower jaw was connected with the upper jaw in a way that made the tusk whorl thrust out as a dagger when the head was raised. The upper jaw, containing 30 teeth which decrease in size posteriorly, is well preserved in many individuals. Juveniles have six tusks, while adults have three.

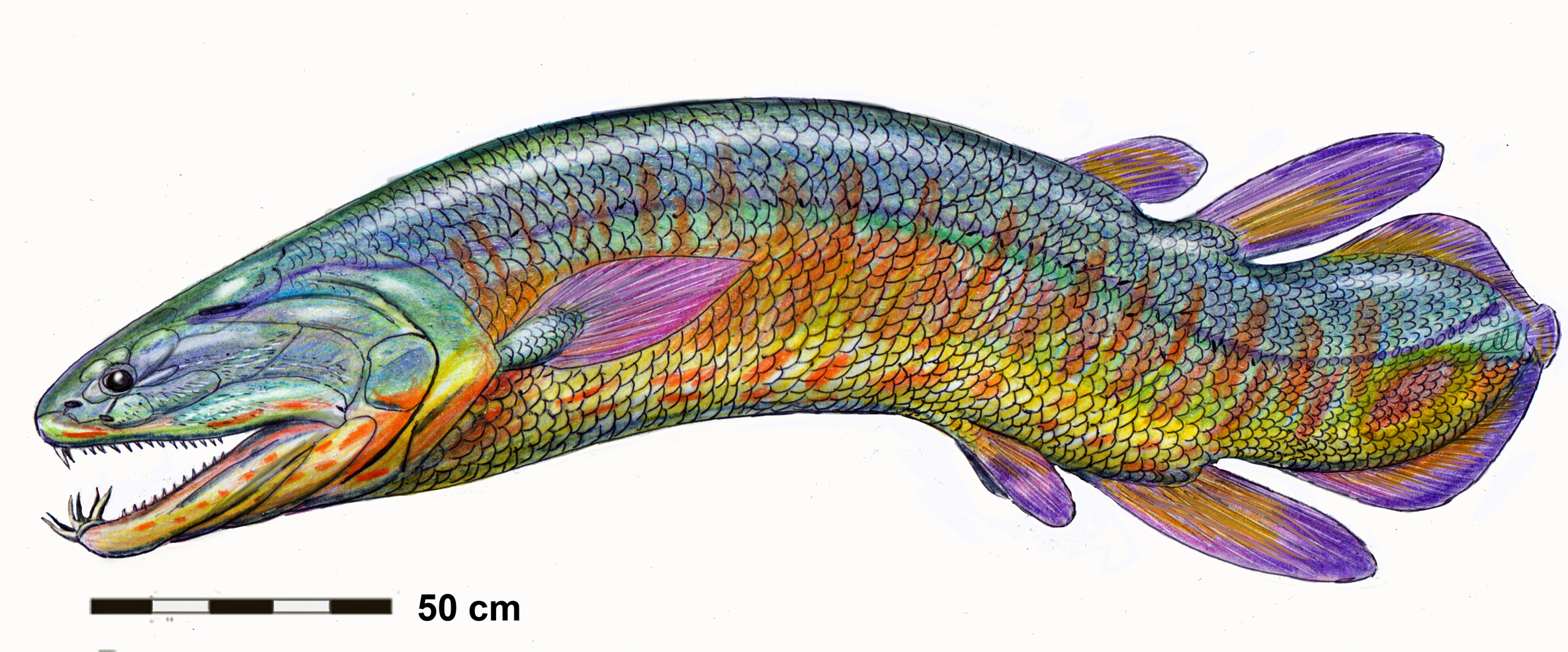
Onychodus reconstruction.

A relatively complete specimen of Onychodus jandemarrai from Western Australia shows that its length was 47 cm long, the head being 10 cm in length with tusks 1.2 cm long. This specimen is only about half the size of larger individuals, since skulls measuring 19 cm in length have been found. However, a single tusk 4 cm long was found, showing that this specimen belonged to an even larger individual, estimated to be around 1.5 metres (4.9 ft). This is still smaller than other species, like O. sigmoides which could reach 3 metres (9.8 ft) in length, and an undescribed maxilla from Delaware Limestone of Ohio which whole animal is estimated to reach up to 4 metres (13 ft) long. Evidence found of the body reveals that a cross section of this fish would have been oval in shape. On the sides of the body, Onychodus had a series of pores which provided a sensory system that enabled the fish to locate prey and to position itself in narrow spaces. The tail fin is almost symmetrical around the vertebral column. It was rounded slightly and would have been very flexible with a broad sweep producing forward motion. A long fin extends posteriorly, along half the tail fin, forming the second dorsal fin. Evidence of the first dorsal fin is incomplete, but scientists believe that a fossil element found was its fin support. Ventrally, the large anal fin extends back beneath the anterior part of the tail fin. Scales that overlap anteriorly have been found, the smallest being only 5 mm across, and the largest 22 mm.

== Classification and systematics ==
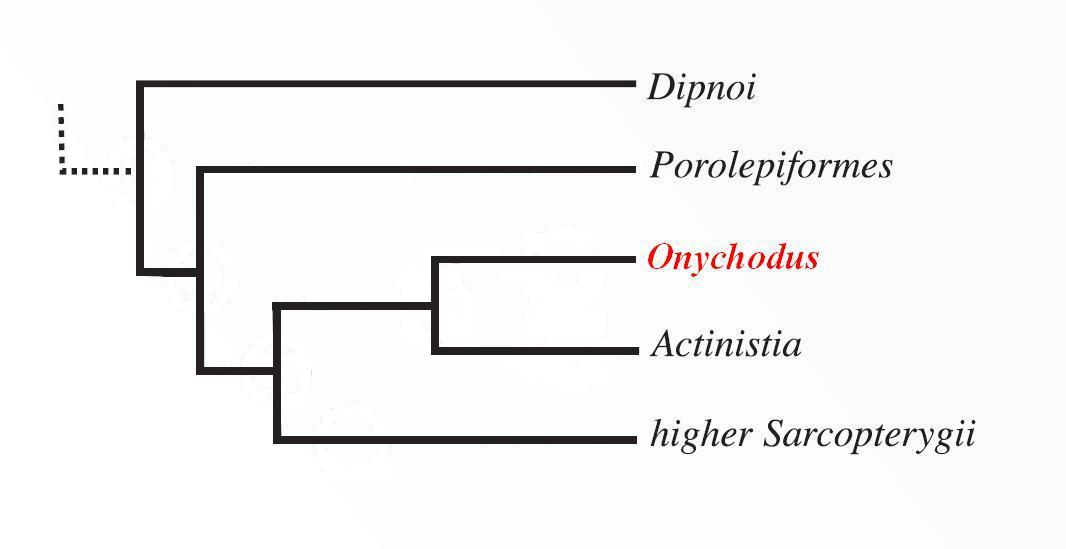
Phylogenetic position of Onychodus in lobe-finned fishes, representing the Onychodontiformes. From top to bottom: Dipnoi– Lungfishes, Porolepiformes– An order of lobe-finned fishes, Actinistia– Coelacanths, higher-Sarcopterygii– More derived forms of lobe-finned fishes.

Onychodus is the type genus of the order Onychodontida and the family Onychodontidae to which it belongs. The family name 'Onychodontidae' was created for Onychodus by the British palaeontologist Arthur Smith Woodward in 1891. The group of onychodontiformes, described in 1973 by the late Dr. Mahala Andrews, was characterized by a highly kinetic skull and tusk-like teeth.

Suggestions by palaeontologist John A. Long refer to a close phylogenetic relationship between Onychodus and the basal lobe-finned fish Psarolepis from China. It is generally acknowledged that Onychodus and Psarolepis are both basal bony fishes, because of the absence of major features that unite coelacanths, lungfishes and tetrapod-like lobe-finned fishes. The position of Onychodus and Psarolepis in the cladogram is outside the major clade of sarcopterygians (lobe-finned fishes), but at a position more derived than actinopterygians (ray-finned fishes).

== History ==
=== Early discovery and research ===
Onychodus fossils were first described by John Strong Newberry in 1857. The type species is Onychodus sigmoides Newberry, 1857, from either the Columbus Limestone and/or the Delaware Limestone (Middle Devonian) at Milford, Delaware, and Sandusky, Ohio. Some of the specimens were illustrated in Report of the Geological Survey of Ohio, Volume I, Part II in 1873. One of his plates was drawn by geologist Grove Karl Gilbert. Most specimens that Newberry described belong to Onychodus sigmoides, but he also described another species, Onychodus hopkinsi. The name of the species Onychodus sigmoides comes from the word "sigmoid," meaning "S shaped," referring to the shape of the teeth (or tusks) on the parasymphysial whorl. Most species of Onychodus have this basic form of teeth. In 1889, Neweberry described a third species of Onychodus, O. ortoni. Some of the Onychodus specimens examined by J. S. Newberry are in the American Museum of Natural History, and others are in the Orton Geological Museum at The Ohio State University.

In 1995, Roy Wagner, Operations Manager for American Aggregates Corp., in Ostrander, Delaware County, Ohio, United States, found parts of Onychodus sigmoides including a lower jaw, and skull and other fragments. All remains were found as isolated elements because the bones of Onychodus were loosely joined and dispersed quickly after the death of the fish. Studies show that Onychodus sigmoides was about 3 m in length and was the largest known bony fish of the Middle Devonian Period.

=== Later discoveries ===
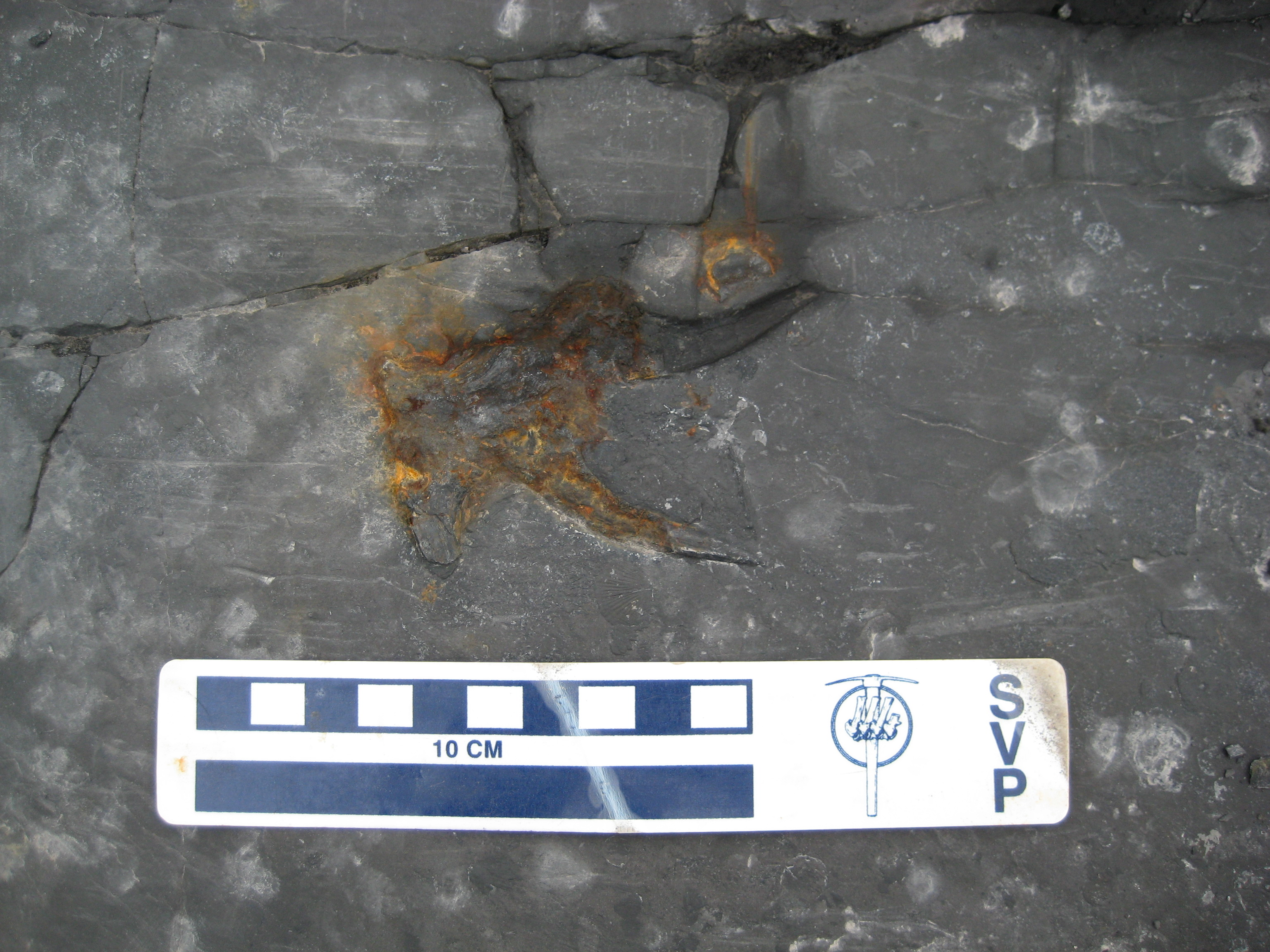
Tooth whorl from Seneca Stone Quarry

Onychodus jaekeli was the first species of Onychodus to be described in the 20th century. Fossils were found in Germany and described by palaeontologist Walter Gross in 1965. Onychodus jaekeli has up to nine barbed tusks of equal length.

O. yassensis was found in New South Wales at the Late Devonian Canowindra site and described by palaeontologist David Lindley in 2002.

Onychodus jandemarrai, found in the Gogo Formation (Devonian) at Kimberley, Western Australia, is the best known species of the genus. It was described in 2006 by the late Dr. Mahala Andrews, with colleagues Dr John Long, Dr Per Ahlberg, Prof. Ken Campbell and Dr Richard Barwick from material collected by the British Museum of Natural History, the Bureau of Mineral Resources and the Australian National University in Canberra. Material gathered by Dr. Long from limestone in the Gogo Formation contributed much new informationabout the genus. Although much is known of this species, there are missing details such as the shape of the posterior end of the tail, the pectoral and pelvic fins and the first dorsal fin. The name of species O. jandemarrai comes from the Aboriginal warrior Jandamarra who lived in that area.

Less known species of Onychodus are: Onychodus anglicus (Woodward 1888) which was found in England, Onychodus arcticus (Woodward 1889) from Spitsbergen, Norway, Onychodus hopkinsi Newberry, 1857 and Onychodus ortoni Newberry, 1889 from Ohio, USA, Onychodus obliquidentatus (Jessen 1966), from Rhenish Massif, Germany, and O. firouzi (Janvier & Martin, 1979).

In 2017, Mann et al. described a new species, Onychodus eriensis, from the Dundee Formation of Pelee Island, Canada. In 2025, Goodchild et al. described a new species, O. mikijuk, from the Nordstrand Point Formation of Devon Island, Nunavut Territory, Canada.

== Paleobiology ==
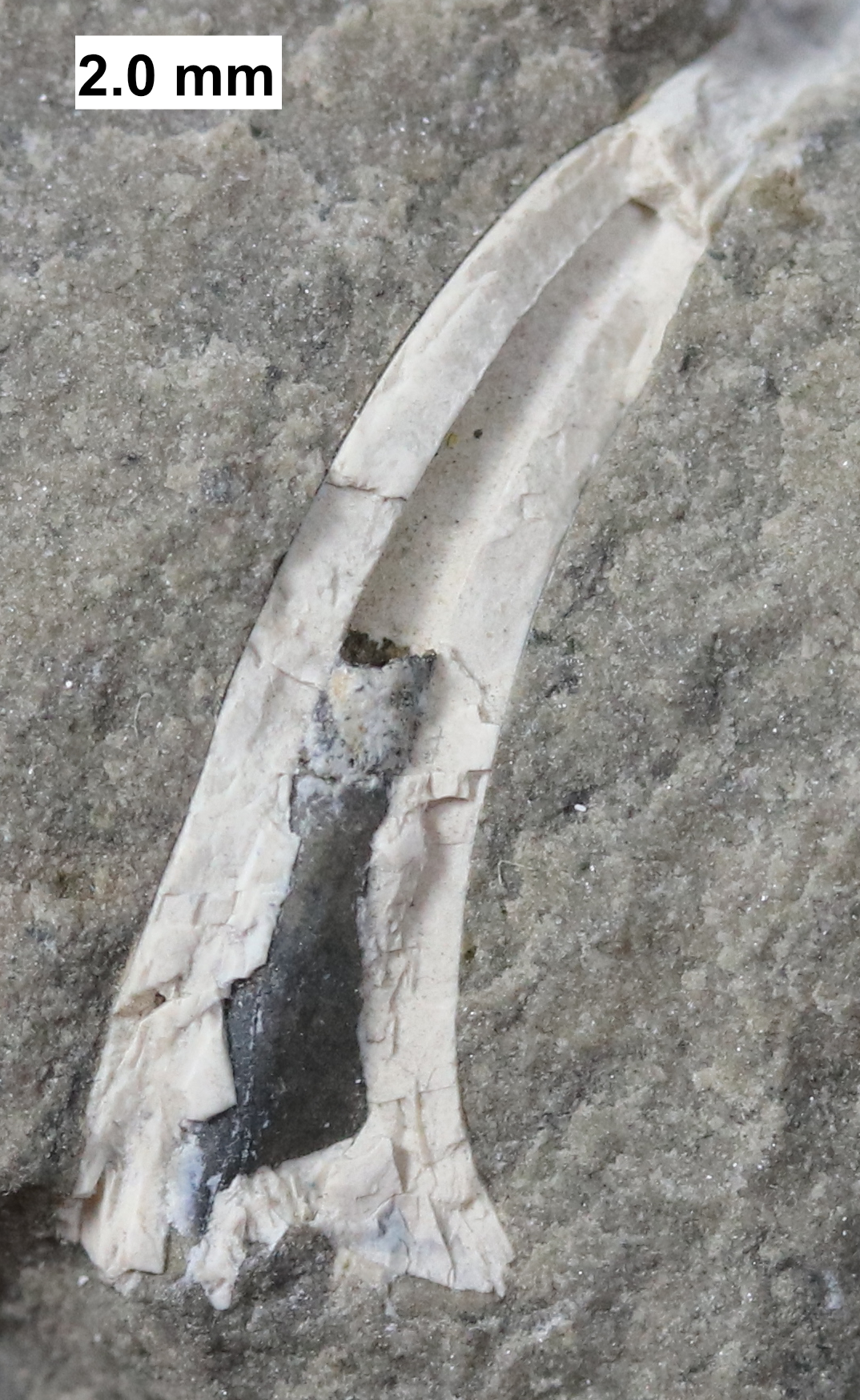
Onychodus tooth with carbonized pulp in its pulp cavity, from the Middle Devonian of Wisconsin

Many features of onychodont anatomy are known only from Onychodus itself. As other onychodontiformes, it has a highly kinetic and flexible skull. This unusual characteristic was due to the loose attachment of the skull bones, which sometimes overlapped, and were connected only by soft tissue and cartilage. Even the braincase was only partially made of bone.

Other distinctive traits are related to the tusk whorls on the lower jaw. Because they could rotate, this was a different method of jaw articulation which did not compare with primitive ray-finned fish. The lower jaw was entirely articulated with cartilage, without an intermediate structure between the opposite sides, allowing the separation of the bones when prey was struck. Moreover, the loose articulation caused lateral movement, making the tusk walls move out of alignment. The parts of the lower jaw would have rotated inwards upon closing in order for the tusk whorls to fit exactly into the hollow spaces in the upper jaw. It is suggested that a ligament attachment and retractor mechanism existed in a pit under the tusk whorl, a unique condition in vertebrates. The capacity of the teeth on the lower jaw to fit with the tooth rows in the upper jaw, upon closure, kept the tusk whorls in place.

=== Ambush behavior ===
Through studies scientists believe that Onychodus was an ambush predator. John A. Long has suggested that Onychodus probably hid in the Devonian reefs, lunging at its prey as it swam by. A fossil specimen of Onychodus from Western Australia was found with a placoderm fish half its length logged in its throat. This interesting find was described and illustrated by Dr. John A. Long. The pectoral fins were strong enough for the animal to "walk" around the sea floor in search of a hiding place between coral colonies. The posterior dorsal fin was quite powerful, providing quick speed for capturing prey.
