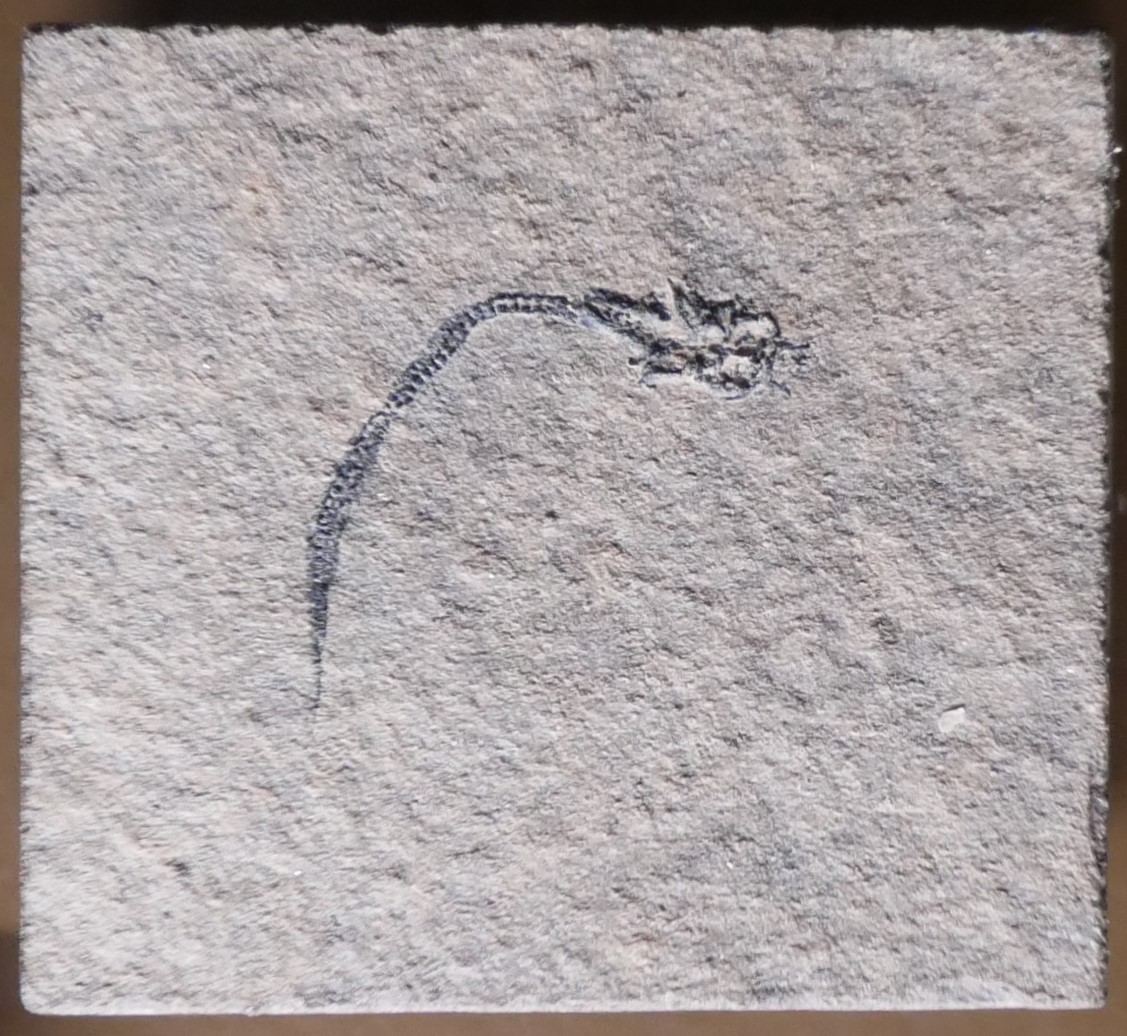
- Fossil on display at the Cincinnati Museum Center

Scientific classification
- Kingdom: Animalia
- Phylum: Chordata
- Clade: Eugnathostomata (?)
- Genus: †Palaeospondylus; Traquair, 1890

Type species
- †Palaeospondylus gunni Traquair, 1890

Other species
- †Palaeospondylus australis Burrow et al., 2024

= Palaeospondylus =

Palaeospondylus Temporal range: Early-Middle Devonian (Emsian-Eifelian), ~400–390 Ma

Extinct genus of vertebrates

Palaeospondylus ("early vertebra") is an extinct genus of fish described from fossils found in both the Achanarras slate quarry of Caithness, Scotland, and the Cravens Peak Beds of Queensland, Australia.

It lived during the Early and Middle Devonian epochs, around 400 to 390 million years ago.

== Description ==
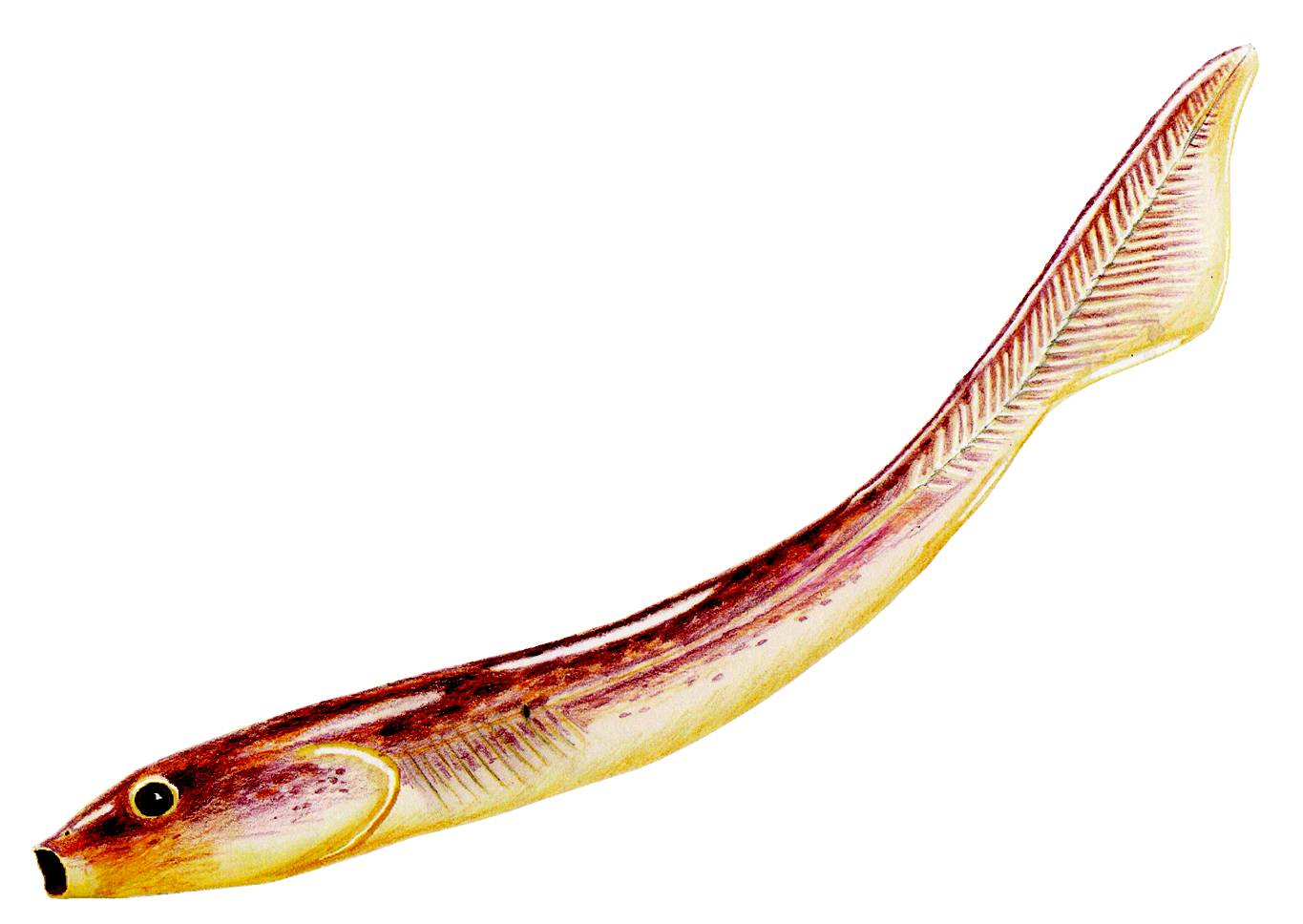
Artist's reconstruction of Palaeospondylus as an agnathan.

The Scottish fossil as preserved is carbonised, and indicates an eel-shaped animal up to 6 centimetres (2 in) in length. The skull, which must have consisted of hardened cartilage, exhibits pairs of nasal and auditory capsules, with a gill apparatus below its hinder part, and ambiguous indications of ordinary jaws.

A fossilized braincase that belonged to P. australis showed that Palaeospondylus lacked both a postorbital process and an intracranial joint, contrary to earlier interpretations.

== Phylogeny ==
The phylogeny of this fossil has puzzled scientists since its discovery in 1890, and many taxonomies have been suggested. In 2004, researchers proposed that Palaeospondylus was a larval lungfish. Previously, it had been classified as a larval tetrapod, unarmored placoderm, an agnathan, an early stem hagfish, and a chimaera. A 2017 study suggested that it was a stem chondrichthyan.

In 2022, researchers reported, based on studies using synchrotron radiation X-ray micro-computed tomography, that the neurocranium of Palaeospondylus was similar to those of the stem-tetrapods Eusthenopteron and Panderichthys, and concluded that Palaeospondylus was between those two phylogenetically. Brownstein (2023) criticized this study, suggesting it would be basal gnathostomes instead. Hirasawa and Kuratani, who are authors in 2022 study, replied to that and reviewed phylogeny again, resulted it would be closer to Acanthostega instead. The 2024 study, using braincase data, ruled out the tetrapod hypothesis, and instead placed Palaeospondylus as either the sister group of Chondrichthyes or as a member of the gnathostome stem-group.

== See also ==
- Georgina Basin
- Orcadian Basin
