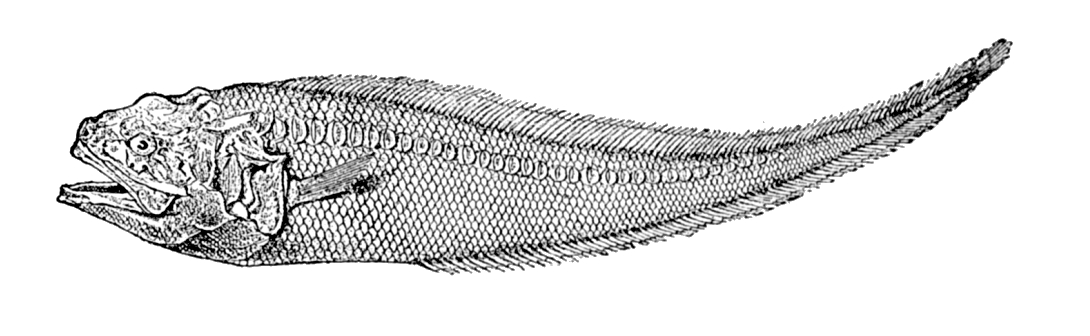

Conservation status
- Least Concern (IUCN 3.1)

Scientific classification
- Kingdom: Animalia
- Phylum: Chordata
- Class: Actinopterygii
- Order: Ophidiiformes
- Family: Ophidiidae
- Genus: Lamprogrammus
- Species: L. niger

Binomial name
- Lamprogrammus niger Alcock, 1891

= Lamprogrammus niger =

Species of fish

Lamprogrammus niger is a species of fish in the family Ophidiidae.
