= Mithakaspis =

Mithakaspis Temporal range: Late Devonian

Scientific classification
- Kingdom: Animalia
- Phylum: Chordata
- Class: †Placodermi
- Order: †Arthrodira
- Family: †Groenlandaspididae
- Genus: †Mithakaspis; Young & Goujet, 2003

Type species
- Mithakaspis lyentye Young & Goujet, 2003

Extinct genus of arthrodire placoderm

Mithakaspis is an extinct genus of groenlandaspid arthrodire placoderm. Its fossils have been found both the Northern Territory Dulcie Sandstone and the Cravens Peak Beds, in Queensland, Australia. The full binominal name of Mithakaspis lyentye first comes from the Mithaka Waterhole, located about 20 kilometers north of the Toomba Range, and just west of the Queensland-Northern Territory border. Then aspis, the Greek word for shield, and finally the species name, lyentye, meaning 'spear tip' in the Arrernte language, which refers to the elongated, pointed median dorsal plates.

In addition to the median dorsal plates, M. lyentye is known from trunk armour remains, which are similar to those of the German genus Tiaraspis. It should be noted however that different sets of median dorsal plates vary in ornament and shape, and it is not certain if these bones come from several taxa. Regardless, they have been provisionally described as one taxon.
