= Lamprogrammus fragilis =

Conservation status
- Data Deficient (IUCN 3.1)

Scientific classification
- Kingdom: Animalia
- Phylum: Chordata
- Class: Actinopterygii
- Order: Ophidiiformes
- Family: Ophidiidae
- Genus: Lamprogrammus
- Species: L. fragilis

Binomial name
- Lamprogrammus fragilis Alcock, 1892

Species of fish

Lamprogrammus fragilis is a species of fish in the family Ophidiidae.
