= Bukkanodus =

Bukkanodus Temporal range: Early Devonian

Scientific classification
- Kingdom: Animalia
- Phylum: Chordata
- Order: †Onychodontiformes
- Genus: †Bukkanodus; Johanson et al., 2007

Type species
- †B. jesseni Johanson et al., 2007

Extinct genus of bony fishes

Bukkanodus jesseni is a species of prehistoric lobe-finned fish which lived during the Early Devonian period (Pragian stage, about 407 to 411 million years ago). B. jesseni was first described in 2007 by paleontologist Zerina Johanson in the Journal of Paleontology from specimens found in the Fairy Formation of Victoria, Australia.

A new phylogenetic analysis of sarcopterygians placed Bukkanodus outside of the Onychodontiformes as a stem-actinistan basal to the Onychodontiformes+Coelacanthiformes clade.
