= Luckeus =

Luckeus Temporal range: Emsian to Eifelian

Scientific classification
- Kingdom: Animalia
- Phylum: Chordata
- Order: †Onychodontiformes
- Family: †Onychodontidae
- Genus: †Luckeus; Young & Schultze, 2005

Type species
- †Luckeus abudda Young & Schultze, 2005

Extinct genus of bony fishes

Luckeus is an extinct genus of prehistoric lobe-finned fish. Luckeus belonged to the order Onychodontida. It lived during the Early Devonian to Middle Devonian period (Emsian to Eifelian ages) in what is now central Australia.

== Description ==
Luckeus is only known by a left lower jaw, which is the holotype (ANU V2969) of the genus, and also by some isolated teeth (ANU V3108-3112). Before palaeontologists establish a genus name for these remains, they referred to them as "onychodontid" and "crossopterygian" remains, or more specific as "onychodontid teeth remains". In 2005, palaeontologists Gavin Young and Hans-Peter Schultze described these findings and assigned them to a new genus under the name Luckeus. Young and Schultze named Luckeus after the nickname "Lucke" of the late palaeontologist Dr. Hans Ludolph Jessen due to his major study of Paleozoic bony fish. The type species, Luckeus abudda, named after the Abudda Lakes located in the Simpson Desert, about 15 kilometers of the fossil Mereenie Sandstone. The species was also discovered in the Toomba Range, within the rocks of the Cravens Peak Beds.
