= Lamprogrammus exutus =

Conservation status
- Least Concern (IUCN 3.1)

Scientific classification
- Kingdom: Animalia
- Phylum: Chordata
- Class: Actinopterygii
- Order: Ophidiiformes
- Family: Ophidiidae
- Genus: Lamprogrammus
- Species: L. exutus

Binomial name
- Lamprogrammus exutus Nybelin & Poll, 1958

Species of fish

Lamprogrammus exutus is a species of fish in the family Ophidiidae.
