= Mahala Andrews =

Paleontologist

- Born: 9 February 1939; Beckenham, England
- Died: 27 October 1997 (aged 58); Iona, Scotland
- Education: University of Cambridge
- Scientific career
- Fields: Vertebrate paleontology
- Workplaces: National Museum of Scotland

Mahala Andrews (9 February 1939 – 27 October 1997) was a British vertebrae palaeontologist who worked for the National Museum of Scotland.

== Early years and education ==
Andrews was born Sheila Mahala Andrews on 9 February 1939 in Beckenham, London. She was the only child of crafts teacher, Mahala Humphrey, and GPO overseer, Alfred J. R. Andrews. Andrews moved to Sydenham, London with her mother after her father died in 1941. She graduated from Girton College, Cambridge in 1960 with a BSc in zoology.

== Later years and career ==
After graduating from Cambridge, she worked for seven years as a research assistant to geology professor Thomas Stanley Westoll at the University of Newcastle-upon-Tyne. Andrews then returned to Girton College at Cambridge to complete her PhD thesis on fossil lobe-finned fish and also co-authored a paper on the subject in 1970. She was appointed as the Senior Scientific Officer in the Department of Geology at the Royal Scottish Museum (now the National Museum of Scotland) in Edinburgh in 1968 and became a Principal Scientific Officer in 1973.

Her work, which focused on the fossil lobe-finned fish that would later evolve into the first land vertebrates, became the principal foundation on which research of the origin of amphibians is based. She published a book, The Discovery of Fossil Fishes in Scotland up to 1845, in 1982 and wrote several articles on prehistoric lobe-finned fish such as Onychodus. Andrews also made drawings of many of the fossils which she studied and travelled extensively including joining the first official palaeontology party to work in China in 1979.

She was a Christian and when she retired early in 1993 due to ill health she bought a house on the island of Iona to join the religious community there. She died on Iona on 27 October 1997.
