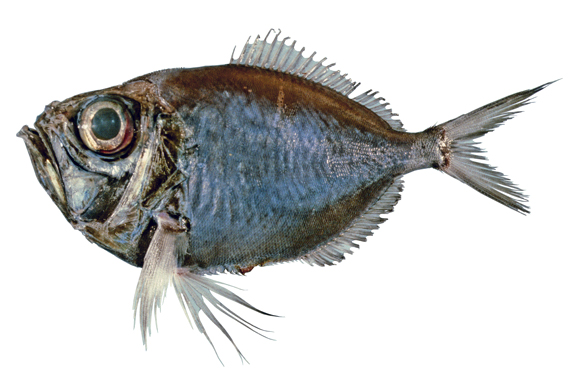

Conservation status
- Least Concern (IUCN 3.1)

Scientific classification
- Kingdom: Animalia
- Phylum: Chordata
- Class: Actinopterygii
- Order: Trachichthyiformes
- Family: Diretmidae
- Genus: Diretmichthys; Kotlyar, 1990
- Species: D. parini

Binomial name
- Diretmichthys parini (Post & Quéro, 1981)

= Parin's spinyfin =

Species of fish

Parin's spinyfin, Parin's spinyfish, black discfish, black spinyfin, or spiny discfish (Diretmichthys parini) is a spinyfin of the monotypic genus Diretmichthys. Adults are found in oceans at depths of between 500 m to 2100 m. Its length is up to 40 cm.

== Distribution ==
Parin's spinyfish is a rare species but is widely distributed. It is found in the Western Pacific, Western Indian and Eastern Atlantic Oceans. Diretmichthys parini is also found in the Caribbean Sea. Its latitudinal range is 40°N–40°S.

In the month-long NORFANZ Expedition of 2003 which was examining the biodiversity of the seamounts and slopes of the Norfolk Ridge near New Zealand, thirteen specimens averaging 900g (2 lb), were collected from nine locations.

== Description ==
This fish lacks dorsal spines, but it has 26–29 dorsal soft rays. The tip of its pelvic fin extends to origin of its anal fin. Adults are greyish black in color.

== Behavior ==
Diretmichthys parini feeds on small crustaceans and planktonic organisms. It breeds throughout the year.
