= Lurapullaspis =

Lurapullaspis Temporal range: Eifelian–Emsian

Scientific classification
- Kingdom: Animalia
- Phylum: Chordata
- Class: †Placodermi
- Order: †Arthrodira
- Genus: †Lurapullaspis; Young & Goujet, 2003

Species
- †Lurapullaspis johannseni Young & Goujet, 2003

Extinct genus of fish

Lurapullaspis is a monospecific genus of bulbocanthid arthrodire placoderm from the Early to Middle Devonian Cravens Peak Beds and Dulcie Sandstone. It is named after the Lurapulla Waterhole, where the first remains were discovered in 1961, along with the Greek word for shield, aspis. The length of its trunk armour was at least 30 millimeters long, with a median dorsal spine about three times the length of the trunk armour; about 9 centimeters.
