= Panjiangosteus =

Panjiangosteus Temporal range: Pragian

Scientific classification
- Kingdom: Animalia
- Phylum: Chordata
- Class: †Placodermi
- Order: †Arthrodira
- Family: †Antarctaspidae
- Genus: †Panjiangosteus
- Species: †P. eurycephala

Binomial name
- †Panjiangosteus eurycephala Xue et al., 2026

Extinct genus of antarctaspid arthrodire

Panjiangosteus is an extinct monotypic genus of antarctaspid arthrodire that lived in what is now China during the Pragian stage of the Early Devonian period.

== Description ==
The type species of the genus, Panjiangosteus eurycephala, possessed a broad skull roof. Its neck joint was unique among arthrodires and had a ventral laminar ridge and a vertical dermal articular facet; its neck joint bore a resemblance to those of petalichthyids.
