= Nardoichthys =

Nardoichthys Temporal range: Cretaceous

Scientific classification
- Kingdom: Animalia
- Phylum: Chordata
- Class: Actinopterygii
- Order: Perciformes
- Family: †Nardoichthyidae
- Genus: †Nardoichthys; Sorbini & Bannikov, 1991

Type species
- †Nardoichthys francisci Sorbini & Bannikov, 1991

Extinct genus of fishes

Nardoichthys francisci is an extinct species of perciform fish from the Campanian / Maastrichtian epoch of Nardò, Italy.
