= Qingmenodus =

Qingmenodus Temporal range: Early Devonian

Scientific classification
- Kingdom: Animalia
- Phylum: Chordata
- Order: †Onychodontiformes
- Genus: †Qingmenodus; Lu & Zhu, 2010

Type species
- †Qingmenodus yui Lu & Zhu, 2010

Extinct genus of bony fishes

Qingmenodus is a genus of prehistoric lobe-finned fish. Fossils of Qingmenodus were found in China and date back to the Early Devonian period. Qingmenodus reveals the first well-ossified otoccipital braincase in onychodonts. Palaeontologists believe that Qingmenodus was one of the oldest onychodont fish.

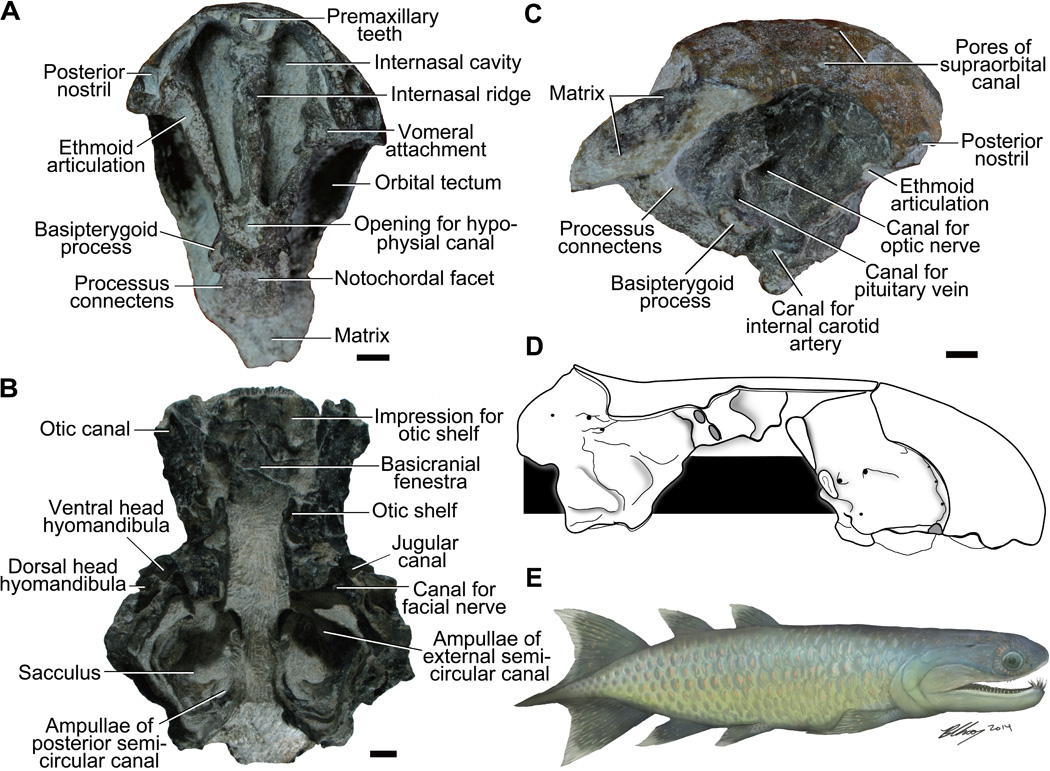
(A) Anterior cranial portion (IVPP V16003.5) in ventral view. (B) Posterior cranial portion (IVPP V16003.6) in ventral view. (C) Anterior cranial portion (IVPP V16003.5) in right lateral view. (D) Tentative restoration of the natural shape of the neurocranium in right lateral view. (E) Life restoration by Brian Choo. This figure appeared in Lu et al. (2016) Science Advances, vol. 2, no. 6, e1600154.

== Relationships ==
A study of additional new fossils of Qingmenodus in a larger phylogenetic analysis of Sarcopterygii including new neurocranial characters supported placing onychodontiforms as stem-coelacanths, within Actinistia.
