= Potangaspis =

Potangaspis Temporal range: Early Devonian, 420 Ma

Scientific classification
- Kingdom: Animalia
- Phylum: Chordata
- Class: †Placodermi
- Order: †Arthrodira
- Family: †Antarctaspidae
- Genus: †Potangaspis; Min, Jun-qing, Shi-tao et al, 2010

Species
- Potangaspis parvoculatus Min, Jun-qing, Shi-tao et al, 2010 (type)

Extinct genus of fishes

Potangaspis is an extinct genus of placoderm fish that existed in China during the Devonian period. It was first named by Zhu Min, Wang Jun-qing, and Wang Shi-tao in 2010, and the type species is Potangaspis parvoculatus.
