= Plesioheros =

Plesioheros Temporal range: Eocene

Scientific classification
- Kingdom: Animalia
- Phylum: Chordata
- Class: Actinopterygii
- Division: Teleostei
- Order: Cichliformes
- Family: Cichlidae
- Genus: †Plesioheros; Perez et al., 2010
- Species: †P. chauliodus

Binomial name
- †Plesioheros chauliodus Perez et al., 2010

Extinct genus of fishes

Plesioheros is an extinct genus of heroin cichlid that inhabited Argentina during the Eocene epoch. It contains a single species, P. chauliodus.
