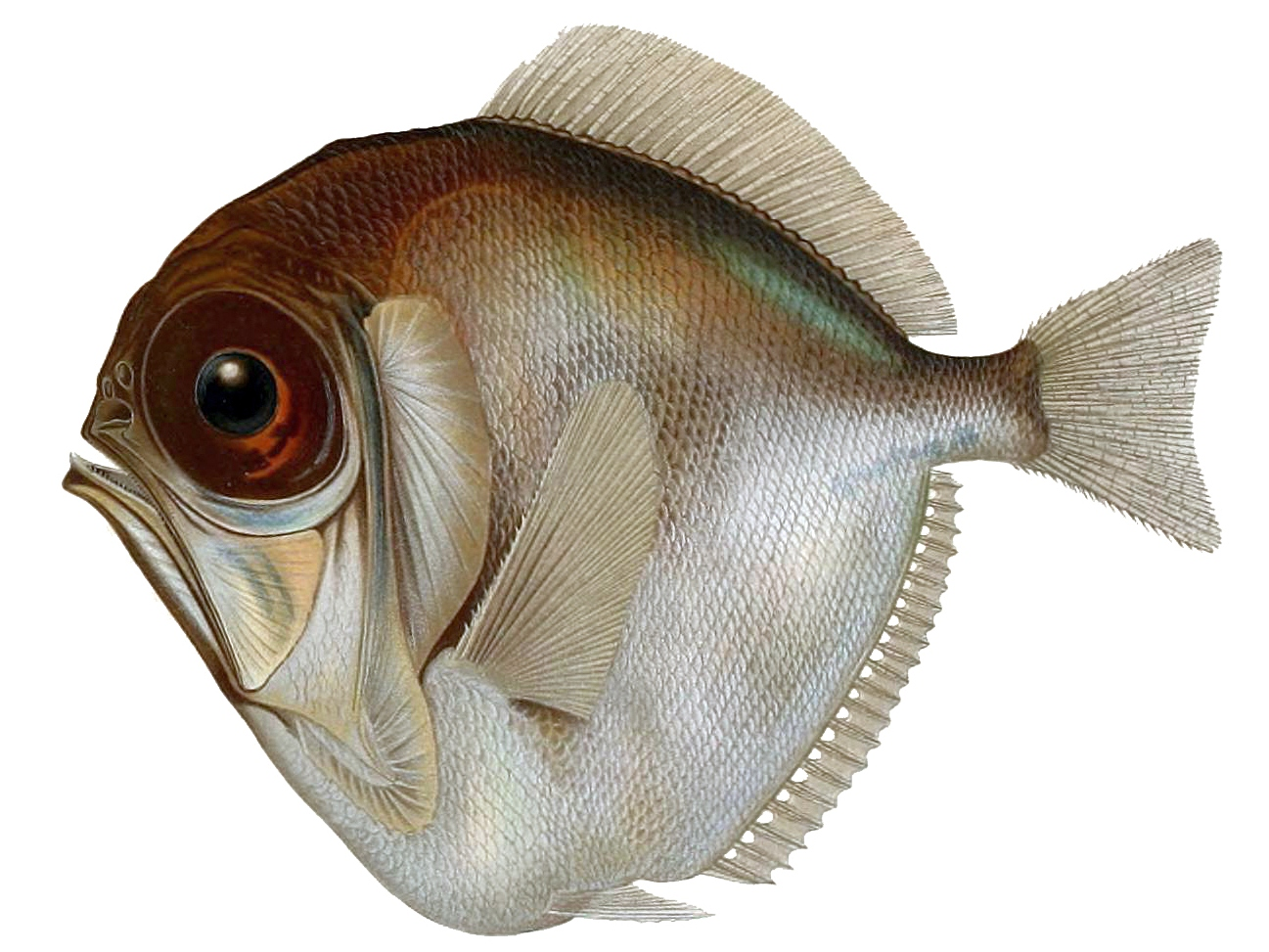

Conservation status
- Least Concern (IUCN 3.1)

Scientific classification
- Kingdom: Animalia
- Phylum: Chordata
- Class: Actinopterygii
- Order: Trachichthyiformes
- Family: Diretmidae
- Genus: Diretmus; J. Y. Johnson, 1864
- Species: D. argenteus

Binomial name
- Diretmus argenteus J. Y. Johnson, 1864

= Silver spinyfin =

Species of fish

The silver spinyfin (Diretmus argenteus) is a deep-sea spinyfin found across the world’s oceans (except the Mediterranean Sea) at depths reaching about 2,000 m. It belongs to the family Diretmidae and is the only species in the genus Diretmus. Adults usually reach 13–40 cm in length depending on the measurement type.

== Etymology ==
The genus name Diretmus comes from Ancient Greek δι- (di-), meaning "two", and ἐρετμός (eretmós), meaning "oar". The specific epithet argenteus is Latin for "silvery".

== Identification ==
The silver spinyfin has a flat, disc-shaped body with sharp, scute-covered edges along its belly. Its body is very thin from side to side, giving it a “flattened” look. The head has a large, upturned mouth and huge eyes adapted for life in the deep sea. The fins are small, with the tail (caudal fin) being short and slightly squared off. Its color is bright silver with a dark or blackish back, and it lacks a lateral line. Juveniles tend to be more transparent than adults.

Adults have small, spiny scales that easily fall off. The largest individuals may reach about 40 cm in total length, though most reports list around 13 cm in standard length. It can be confused with other deep-sea spinyfins but is easily recognized by its lack of a lateral line and the sharp ventral keel made of bony scutes.

This species has no close living relatives within its family and is the only member of its genus.

== Distribution ==
The silver spinyfin lives in tropical and temperate oceans around the world but has not been found in the Mediterranean. It is a deep-sea fish, found mainly between 300 and 1,200 m deep, sometimes down to 2,000 m. Adults usually live in midwater or near the bottom (benthopelagic zone), while larvae drift in surface plankton before moving deeper as they grow.

It has been recorded off the coasts of Australia (Western Australia, New South Wales, Victoria, Tasmania), and throughout the Atlantic, Pacific, and Indian Oceans. Although it is widely distributed, it is rarely caught and not considered abundant.

== Life history ==
Reproduction: The silver spinyfin is oviparous, meaning it lays eggs that hatch into planktonic larvae. Specific spawning times and locations are unknown because the fish live so deep.

Feeding: It likely eats tiny crustaceans, zooplankton, and other small drifting animals. Its large eyes and upward-facing mouth help it catch prey that moves above it in dim light.

Growth: Scientists know little about its growth rate or lifespan, as it’s rarely caught. Deep-sea fish often grow slowly and live longer than shallow species, so this may also apply to the silver spinyfin.

Vision: One of its most remarkable features is its unique vision system. It has 38 rod opsin genes, more than any other vertebrate known. These genes help it see different wavelengths of light in the deep sea, possibly allowing it to detect faint bioluminescent signals or low-light color differences.

== Conservation status ==
The silver spinyfin is listed as “Least Concern” by the IUCN. It is not targeted by fisheries and is only occasionally caught in deep-sea trawls as bycatch. Because it lives far from coastal pollution and fishing areas, it currently faces no major known threats, though deep-sea trawling and ocean changes (warming, oxygen loss, and acidification) could affect its populations in the future.

No population trend data exists, but scientists believe it remains stable worldwide.

== Scientific significance ==
The species is important for understanding how vertebrates adapt to the deep sea. Its exceptional number of opsin genes makes it a model for studying deep-sea color vision. Further research is needed on its diet, reproduction, and population structure.
