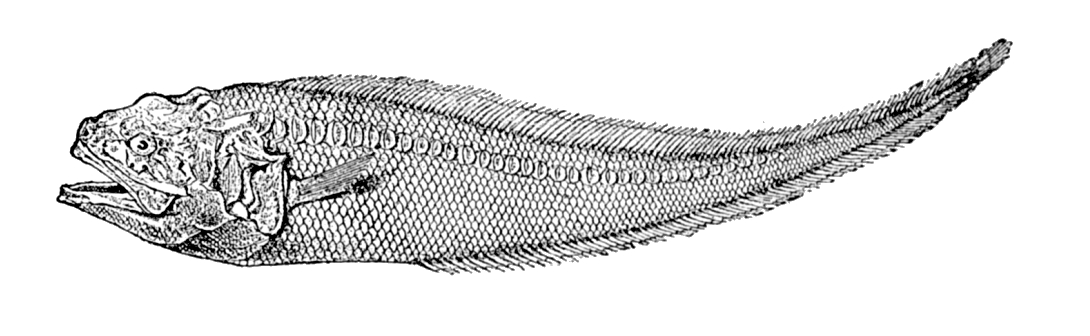
- L. niger

Scientific classification
- Domain: Eukaryota
- Kingdom: Animalia
- Phylum: Chordata
- Class: Actinopterygii
- Order: Ophidiiformes
- Family: Ophidiidae
- Subfamily: Neobythitinae
- Genus: Lamprogrammus; Alcock, 1891

Type species
- Lamprogrammus niger Alcock, 1891

= Lamprogrammus =

Genus of fishes

Lamprogrammus is a genus of cusk-eels.

== Species ==
There are currently five recognized species in this genus:

- Lamprogrammus brunswigi (A. B. Brauer, 1906)
- Lamprogrammus exutus Nybelin & Poll, 1958 (Legless cuskeel)
- Lamprogrammus fragilis Alcock, 1892
- Lamprogrammus niger Alcock, 1891
- Lamprogrammus shcherbachevi Cohen & Rohr, 1993 (Scaleline cusk)
