= Diretmoides =

Scientific classification
- Kingdom: Animalia
- Phylum: Chordata
- Class: Actinopterygii
- Order: Trachichthyiformes
- Family: Diretmidae
- Genus: Diretmoides; Post & Quéro, 1981

Genus of fishes

Diretmoides is a genus of spinyfins with one species (pauciradiatus) known from the eastern Atlantic Ocean and the other (veriginae) known from the eastern Indian Ocean.

== Species ==
There are currently two recognized species in this genus:

- Diretmoides pauciradiatus (Woods, 1973) (Longwing spinyfin)
- Diretmoides veriginae Kotlyar, 1987
