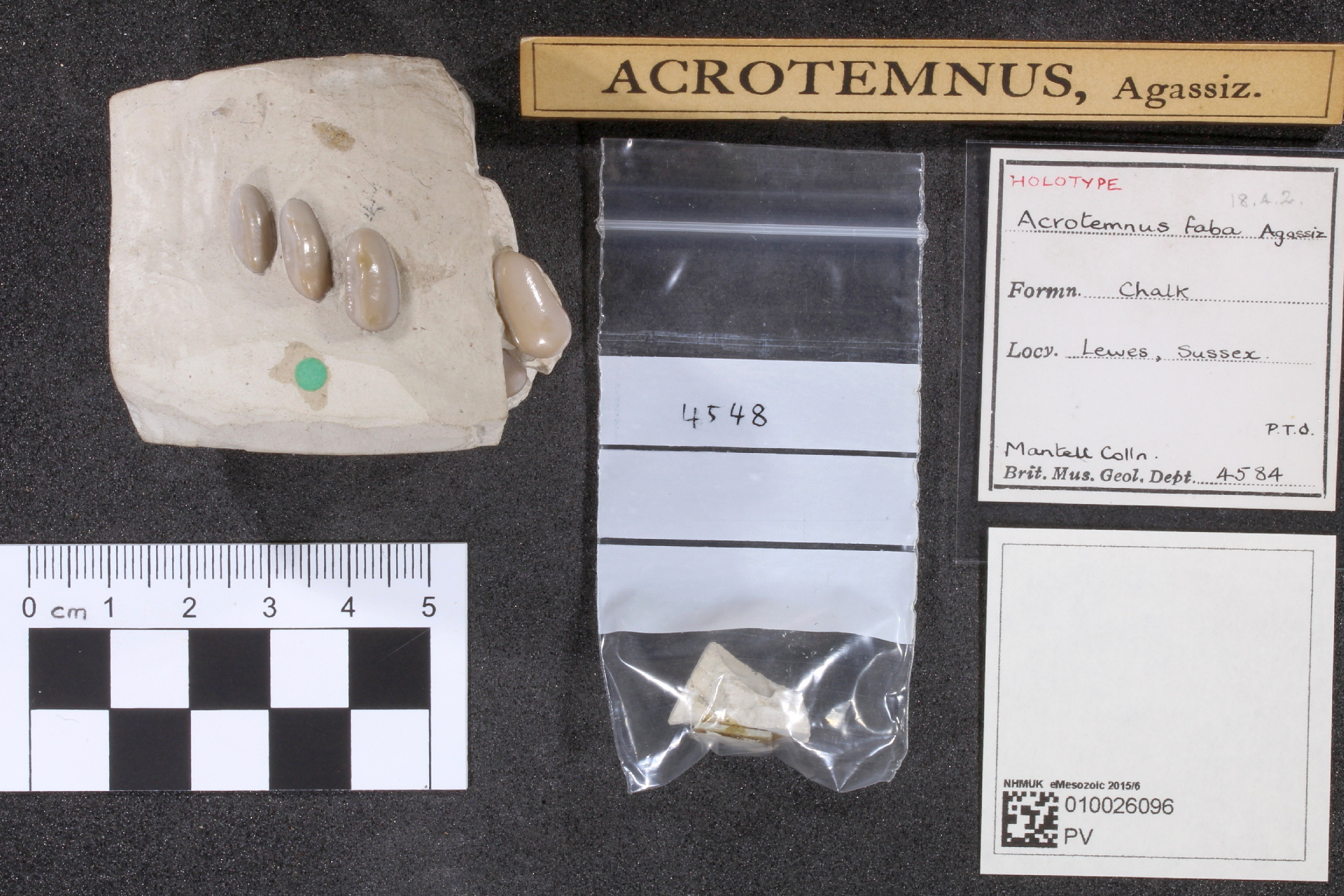
- A. faba holotype, Natural History Museum, London

Scientific classification
- Kingdom: Animalia
- Phylum: Chordata
- Class: Actinopterygii
- Order: †Pycnodontiformes
- Family: †Pycnodontidae
- Genus: †Acrotemnus; Agassiz, 1836

Type species
- †Acrotemnus faba Agassiz, 1836

Species
- †A. faba Agassiz, 1836; †A. streckeri (Hibbard, 1939); †A. megafrendodon (Shimada, Williamson & Sealey, 2010)

Synonyms
- †Macropycnodon Shimada, Williamson, and Sealey, 2010

= Acrotemnus =

Acrotemnus Temporal range: Turonian, 93.9–89.8 Ma

Extinct genus of pycnodontid fish from the Late Cretaceous

Acrotemnus is an extinct genus of marine pycnodontid ray-finned fish known from Europe, North America, and Africa during the Turonian stage of the Upper Cretaceous. North American species could reach comparatively giant sizes for pycnodonts.

== Taxonomy ==
The following species are known:

- A. faba Agassiz, 1836 - Turonian of England (English Chalk)
- A. megafrendodon (Shimada, Williamson & Sealey, 2010) - Turonian of New Mexico, USA (Mancos Shale) (=Macropycnodon megafrendodon Shimada, 2010)
- A. streckeri (Hibbard, 1939) - Turonian of Kansas (Carlile Shale), potentially Texas (Boquillas Formation) (=Coelodus streckeri Hibbard, 1939)

An indeterminate potential species is also known from the Turonian of Nigeria (Benue Trough).

Acrotemnus was initially known from just the type species A. faba described by Louis Agassiz in 1843 from specimens collected in England. In 1939, Hibbard described a large-sized pycnodont from a tooth plate from Kansas, which he placed in Coelodus as C. streckeri. In 2010, Shimada, Williamson & Sealey described a gigantic pycnodont known from a few tooth plates found in New Mexico as Macropycnodon megafrendodon, placing C. streckeri in the same genus. However, in 2021, Shimada, Portillo, and Cronin described a partial skeleton of a pycnodont from Texas as potentially being a specimen of A. streckeri. This specimen revealed close similarities between the anatomy of Macropycnodon and Acrotemnus, leading to the lumping of the former into the latter.

== Description ==
A. megafrendodon is known from isolated teeth, the largest being 1.75 centimetres (0.69 in) in width. A comparison between the tooth-to-body size ratio of more completely known relatives, such as Coelodus saturnus, suggests that A. megafrendodon could have reached comparatively gigantic body sizes of over 1–1.2 metres (3.3–3.9 ft). This would make it among the largest pycnodonts, especially given that the majority do not reach over 25 centimetres (9.8 in) in length. The partial specimen of A. cf. streckeri described in 2021 is estimated to have been roughly 1 metre (3.3 ft) in length, supporting these estimates.

== See also ==
- Prehistoric fish
- List of prehistoric bony fish
