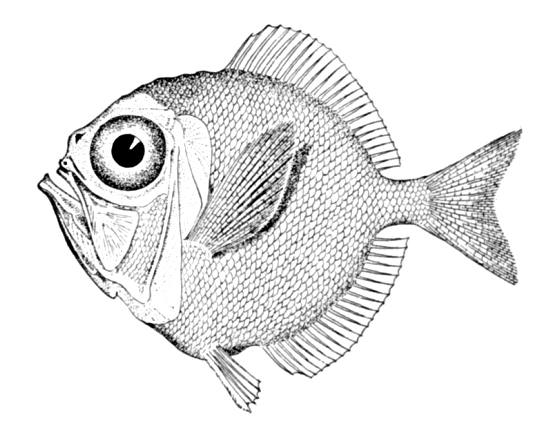
- Silver spinyfin, Diretmus argenteus. from plate 45 of Oceanic Ichthyology by George Brown Goode and Tarleton Hoffman Bean, published 1896

Scientific classification
- Kingdom: Animalia
- Phylum: Chordata
- Class: Actinopterygii
- Order: Trachichthyiformes
- Suborder: Anoplogastroidei
- Family: Diretmidae; T. N. Gill, 1896

Genera
- Diretmichthys; Diretmoides; Diretmus

= Spinyfin =

Spinyfins

Family of fishes

Spinyfins are a family, Diretmidae, of trachichthyform fishes. The family name is derived from the type genus, Diretmus, from Greek, di meaning "two" and eretmos meaning "oar". They are found worldwide in deep waters, as deep as 2,000 m (6,600 ft).

As the common name implies, spinyfins have heavy spines along their fins. They have deep, compressed bodies, and almost vertically aligned mouths. They are dark silver in colour, and reach up to 37 cm (15 in) in length.

== See also ==
- List of fish families
