= Alfred Post (footballer) =

German footballer

Personal information
- Date of birth: 20 August 1926
- Place of birth: Ochtrup, Germany
- Date of death: 7 March 2013 (aged 86)

International career
Years	Team	Apps	(Gls)
1952	Germany		

Alfred Post (20 August 1926 – 7 March 2013) was a German former footballer who competed in the 1952 Summer Olympics. He was born in Ochtrup.
