= Akaimia =

Akaimia Temporal range: Middle-Late Jurassic

Scientific classification
- Kingdom: Animalia
- Phylum: Chordata
- Class: Chondrichthyes
- Subclass: Elasmobranchii
- Division: Selachii
- Order: Orectolobiformes
- Family: incertae sedis
- Genus: †Akaimia; Rees, 2010

Species
- Akaimia altucuspis Rees, 2010; Akaimia myriacuspis Srdic et al., 2016

Extinct genus of sharks

Akaimia is an extinct genus of carpet sharks which existed across Europe. Two species are known, the type species A. altucuspis from the middle or late Jurassic (Callovian or Oxfordian age) of Ogrodzieniec near Zawiercie, southern Poland, and A. myriacuspis, from the middle Jurassic (Callovian) of the Oxford Clay, near Peterborough. It was first named by Jan Rees in 2010.
