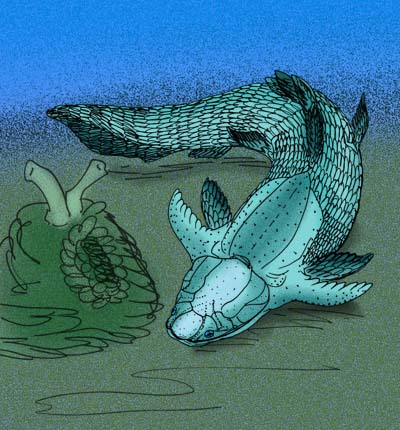
- Life Restoration of the type genus, Antarctaspis mcmurdoensis

Scientific classification
- Kingdom: Animalia
- Phylum: Chordata
- Class: †Placodermi
- Order: †Arthrodira
- Suborder: †Actinolepidoidei
- Family: †Antarctaspidae; White, 1968

Type genus
- Antarctaspis White, 1968

Genera
- Antarctaspis; Panjiangosteus; Potangaspis; Toombalepis; Yujiangolepis

= Antarctaspidae =

Antarctaspidae Temporal range: Pragian to Givetian, Pragian–Givetian

Extinct family of fishes

Antarctaspidae is a potentially polyphyletic extinct family of basal arthrodires known from China, Antarctica, and Australia. The family lasted from the Early to Middle Devonian.

== History of classification ==
Antarctaspidae was erected in the description of the genus Antarctaspis based on the inference of a pair of central plates and extended nuchal plate that was later thought to be a paranuchal plate. In the later interpretation, the animal had no central plates which moved the animal to its own suborder being Antarctaspinae and placed it within the order Phyllolepida. Later genera assigned to the family would favor the original interpretation of the central plates.

The redescription of the genus Yujiangolepis suggested that the family was paraphyletic but potentially had a Chinese origin. Even with the condition of the family, a basal position within arthrodira was supported. More recent papers assign the family to the suborder 'Actinilepidoidei'. As of 2010, the family is defined by the unique combination of three traits which are seen one their own in other families within 'Actinilepidoidei'. These traits include a nuchal plate where the central and subpraorbital sensory canals converge (also seen in wuttagoonaspidae and some members of phyllolepidae), the contact of the rostropineal and nuchal plates (also seen in petalichthyidae), and the tubercular ornament (a basal feature of placoderms).

== Genera ==
Genus	Species	Age	Location	Notes	Image
Antarctaspis	A. mcmurdoensis	Middle Givetian	Antarctica	The genus is known from an incomplete skull roof that measures 70 mm long. Similar to Potangaspis, it had a fused rostropineal plate along with potentially lacking a mesial loop like other members of the family though this could just be due to the incompleteness of the front of the snout.	
Panjiangosteus	P. eurycephala	Pragian	China		
Potangaspis	P. parvoculatus	Early Emsian	China	The genus is only known from an incomplete skull roof with orbits enclosed by the skull roof, similar to what is seen in macropetalichthids, petalichthyids, and antiarchs. Just like Antarctaspis, the animal had a fused rostropineal plate.	
Toombalepis	T. tuberculata	Between the Pragian and Eifelian.	Australia	The genus is known from both trunk plates and an incomplete skull with a more narrow skull than seen in the genus Antarctaspis. Toombalepis is a large member of the family with skull roof length of 190 mm.	
Yujiangolepis	Y. liujingensis	Pragian	China	The genus is known from an incomplete skull containing part of the neurocranium. The skull has a nuchal plate without any sensory line system, suggesting that it was a vestigial structure.	

== Description ==
=== Skull ===
Members of Antarctaspidae are generally small with wide, flat skulls measuring between 40 and 190 mm with orbits only being enclosed within the genus Potangaspis. The ornamentation seen on the skull of at least one genus, Toombalepis, shows individual variation. The animals would have had a long endolymphatic tube within the dermal bone, this trait being characteristic of arthrodires.

=== Postcrania ===
Within the family, the postcrania is only known from the genus Toombalepis. Based on what is seen from this material, the animal's anterior dorsolateral plate would have formed an ornamented spine similar to what is seen in Bryantolepis though it narrows towards the back. This plate also had a larger overlap range with the anterior dorsal plate than what is seen in comparable genera. The anterior lateral plate is similar to what is seen in Wuttagoonaspis, with the notches fusing in front of the pectoral notch to form ridges. Both the anterior lateral and potential parts of the ventral armor show course ornamentation for the size. The truck shield would have probably been much more vaulted indicating that the armor and skull roof wouldn't have been combined in life.

== Paleoecology ==
Fossils of antarctaspids have been found in both freshwater and marine deposits indicating that they would have lived in a variety of environments.
