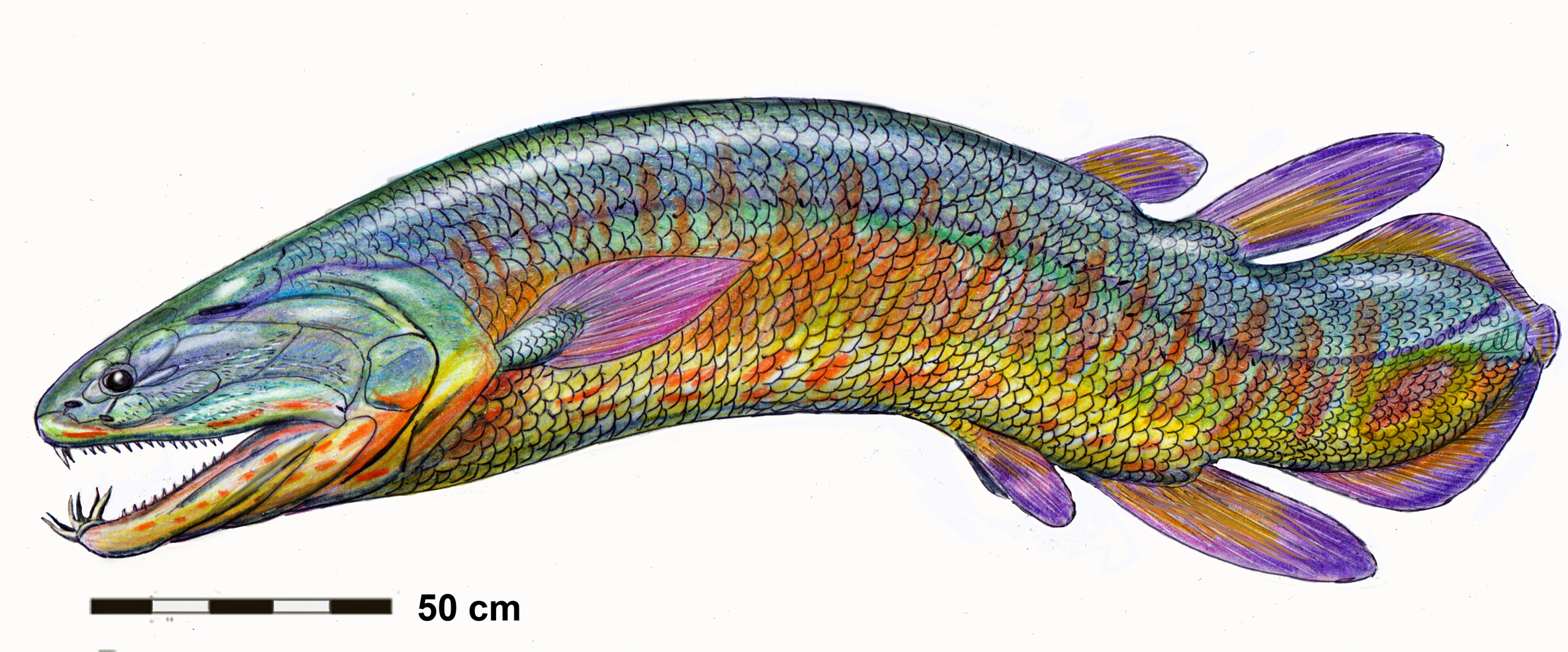
- Reconstruction of Onychodus

Scientific classification
- Kingdom: Animalia
- Phylum: Chordata
- Clade: Sarcopterygii
- Order: †Onychodontiformes; Andrews, 1973

Genera
- †Amazinyomakhulu Gress & Ahlberg, 2026; †Bukkanodus Johanson et al., 2007; †Grossius Schultze, 1973; †Luckeus Young & Schultze, 2005; †Onychodus Newberry, 1857; †Qingmenodus Lu & Zhu, 2009; †Selenodus Mondéjar-Fernández, 2020; †Strunius Jessen, 1966

= Onychodontiformes =

Onychodontiformes Temporal range: Pragian–Famennian Possible Lochkovian record

Extinct order of bony fishes

Onychodontiformes (also known as Onychodontida and Struniiformes) is an order of prehistoric sarcopterygian fish that lived during the Devonian period. The onychodontiforms are generally regarded as early-diverging members of the coelacanth lineage.

== Phylogeny ==
The following cladogram is adapted from Mondéjar-Fernández (2020). The study recovered Onychodontiformes as a paraphyletic group, which is shown in green:

- Crown-Sarcopterygii
  - - Styloichthys
    - Rhipidistia
      - Dipnomorpha
      - Tetrapodomorpha
  - - Bukkanodus
    - - Selenodus
      - - - - Grossius
            - Onychodus
          - - Qingmenodus
            - Strunius
        - Actinistia
          - Euporosteus
          - Gavinia
          - Miguashaia
          - - Diplocercides
            - Latimeria
