= Canowindra =

- Town
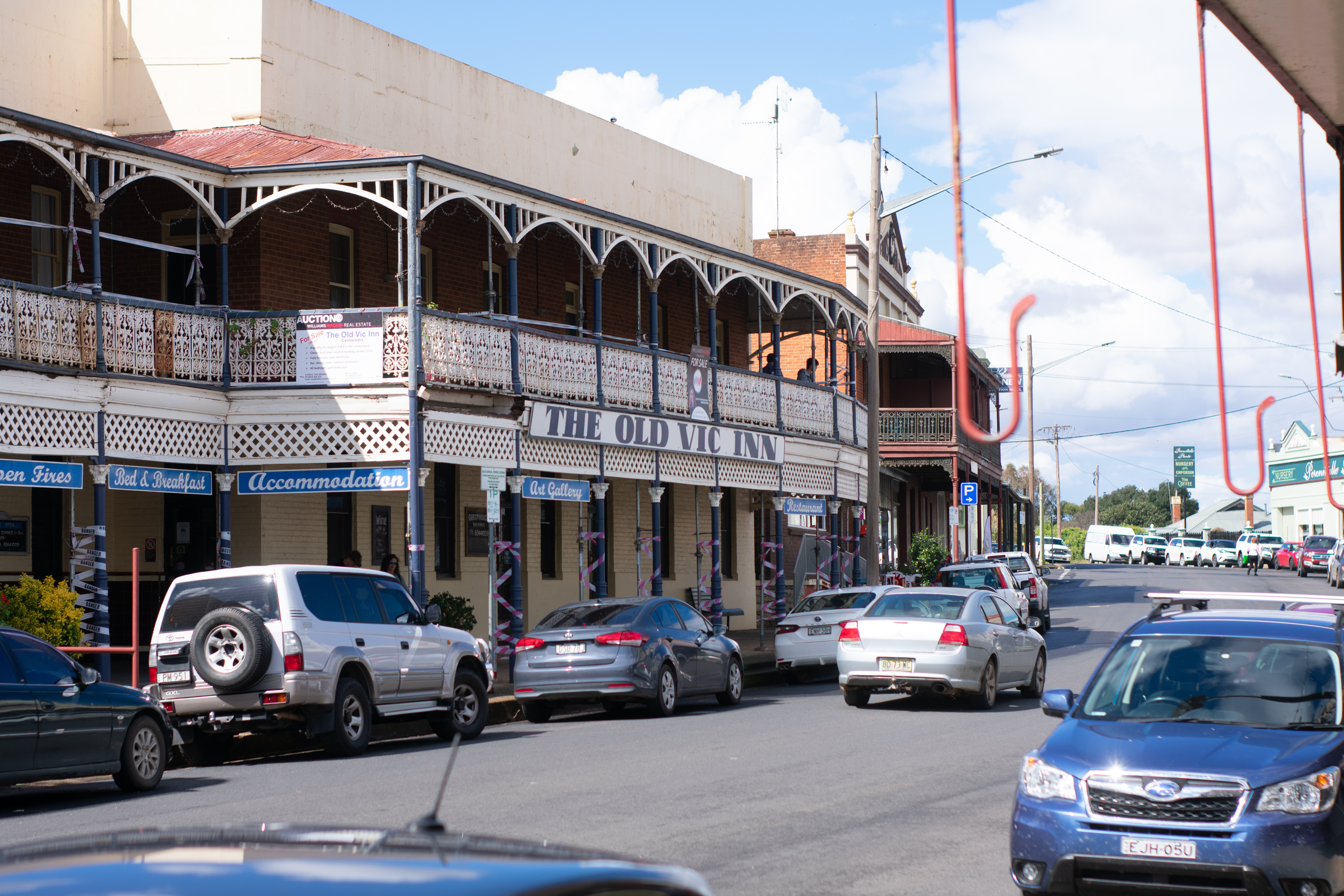
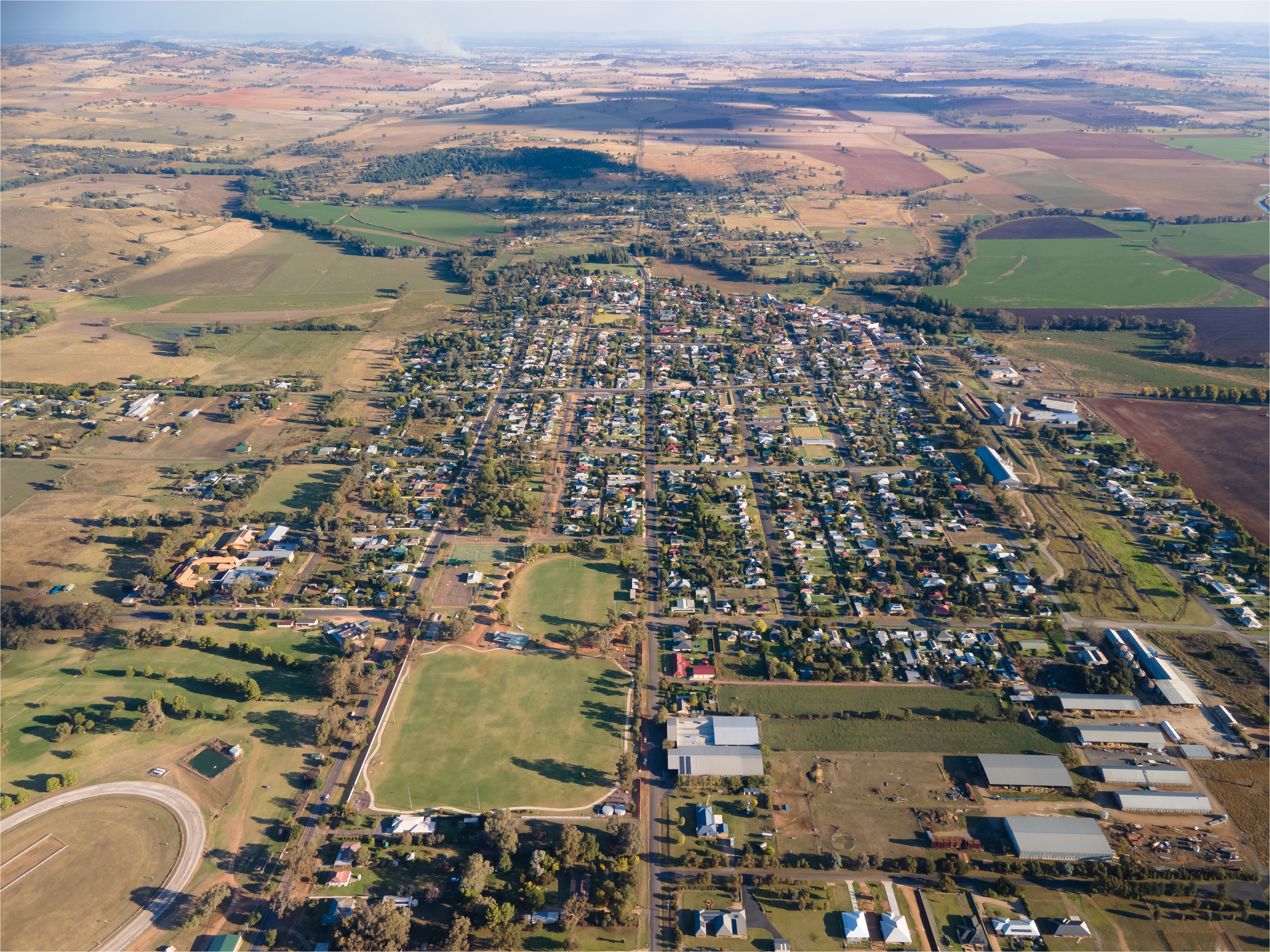
- Main town of Canowindra. Aerial photo of the town.

- Coordinates: 33°34′0″S 148°40′0″E
- Country: Australia
- State: New South Wales
- LGA: Cabonne Shire
- Location: 317 km (197 mi) W of Sydney; 59 km (37 mi) SW of Orange; 32 km (20 mi) N of Cowra
- Established: 1847

Government
  - State electorate: Orange
  - Federal division: Calare
- Elevation: 300 m (980 ft)

Population
  - Total: 2,832 (2021 census)
- Postcode: 2804
- Mean max temp: 24.7 °C (76.5 °F)
- Mean min temp: 8.1 °C (46.6 °F)
- Annual rainfall: 602 mm (23.7 in)

Canowindra (/kəˈnaʊndrə/ kə-NOWN-drə) is a historic township and the largest population centre in Cabonne Shire, situated on the Belubula River. The town is located between Orange and Cowra in the central west of New South Wales, Australia. The curving main street, Gaskill Street, is partly an urban conservation area.

== Toponymy ==
The name of the town is derived from a Wiradjuri (an Aboriginal language) word meaning 'a home' or 'camping place'.

== History ==
Prior to the arrival of Europeans to Australia, the area now known as Canowindra was occupied for tens of thousands of years by the Wiradjuri people. These "people of the three rivers" were hunters and gatherers who exploited the resources available in the rivers and the lands, particularly the river flats.

=== European settlement ===
The first land grant of 640 acres to a European in the area was to James Collits by Governor Ralph Darling in 1829 as a reward for "pointing out a line of road from Mt. York to Bathurst". Subsequently, Collits' father, Pierce, was granted land adjacent to the original grant. There is some evidence that James (or the succeeding owner, Thomas Icely) named the property "Canoundra". Collits owned other significant tracts of land in the area, together with a store and the first hotel. A settlement slowly grew, and as early as 1844 the village (now referred to as "Canowindra") was the site of a government pound.

A post office opened at Canowindra in 1847 with mail coming from Carcoar, but the village was handicapped as part of a main route to the lower Lachlan, first by the lack of a bridge and later by the construction of the railway to Orange. The first bridge across the Belubula River at Canowindra was opened on 28 July 1875. It was replaced by the Waddell Bridge in May 1901, and by the current John Grant Bridge in 1997.

Gold has been mined at Canowindra; the Blue Jacket, Grant's Reef, Blue Maxwell, and Gospel Oak Mines, were located near the town.

=== Bushrangers ===
Bushrangers made four significant incursions at Canowindra within the space of a year, the first of which occurred in September 1863. Late on Saturday morning, 26 September 1863, the bushrangers John Gilbert and Ben Hall, with three other gang members (John O'Meally, Michael Burke and John Vane), arrived at Albert Rothery's 'Clifden' station at Limestone Creek, south-west of Carcoar, where they bailed up the occupants and "partook of dinner – regaling themselves with champagne and brandy". From Rothery's the bushrangers proceeded to Canowindra (after having informed Rothery of their intended destination), arriving at the township at six o'clock in the afternoon. They firstly detained Constable Sykes, the only policeman stationed at Canowindra, and took him to Robinson's public-house. O'Meally and Burke remained at the inn while Hall, Gilbert and Vane "went on a foraging expedition" to the two stores in the township, belonging to Pierce and Hilliar, taking a quantity of men's clothing and three pounds in cash. They then adjourned to Robinson's house and ordered tea. The publican and his wife had departed for Bathurst, leaving Robinson's sister and "the two Miss Flanagan's in charge of the house". After they had eaten "Gilbert very politely requested one of the young ladies to play him a tune on the piano". Later in the evening a dance was proposed, which "continued till daylight the next morning". A number of the town's residents had also been brought to the public-house and it was reported that "the night's amusement" was "spoken of as one of the jolliest affairs that has ever taken place in that small town". In the morning Hall, Vane and Burke rode to 'Bangaroo' station in search of horses, but finding none, returned to Canowindra where Gilbert informed them that troopers were camped on the opposite side of the Belubula River, now in full flood, waiting for the waters to subside. With the exception of Burke, the bushrangers crossed the flooded stream and camped on a hill overlooking the town. Burke crossed the next morning after the waters had dropped, after which the gang rode into "very rough country" to evade the police.

On Monday morning, 12 October 1863, John Gilbert, Ben Hall and John O'Meally returned to Canowindra and "held it against all comers" for three days and nights, "their proceedings being characterised by a cool audacity, which has hitherto been unequalled". The bushrangers stuck up the stores and public-houses in the township and established a base at William Robinson's public-house. Gang-members guarded the approaches to the town, and anybody who made an appearance was taken into custody and brought to the hotel. Their captives were told they must remain at the hotel, but they "might call for whatever [they] liked at the bushrangers' expense". On learning of the bushrangers' incursion, the local policeman, Constable Sykes, had started for Eugowra (being unable to cross the rising Belubula River to go to Cowra). However he was met on the road by the bushrangers and turned back. The outlaws confiscated his firearms and handcuffs and took him to Robinson's public-house, telling him "to go in and enjoy himself till he received further orders". Each dray and their horse- or bullock-teams that arrived during the three days were stopped; eventually numbering about twelve to fourteen, the teamsters were "lodged, fed and supplied with drink, free of expense" and no attempt was made by the bushrangers to interfere with their loads. At one stage Gilbert purchased a bundle of cigars and threw them on one of the tables in the hotel for anyone who cared to smoke them. A "pile of sweetmeats" was also provided for the enjoyment of all.

It was believed that the bushrangers were expecting a gold escort to arrive at the township (which never arrived). Mid-morning on the Tuesday three landholders and businessmen from the Forbes district, Hibberson, Twaddell and Kirkpatrick, drove up to the hotel, where Ben Hall informed them they were to be detained. As they got down from their vehicle John O'Meally saw that Kirkpatrick was carrying a revolver, and held his own weapon at Kirkpatrick's head, "compelled him to give it up". "A first-class dinner was ordered" for the three squatters, "and the cost of this as well as everything else called for was defrayed by the gang". By the third day there were about forty people detained at the hotel. During the occupation the bushrangers only drank bottled ale and porter, insisting that the corks be drawn in their presence. The outlaws engaged in a variety of amusements, of which target shooting was a favourite. For those who resided in the neighbourhood wishing to visit their homes, a leave of absence was granted providing it did not exceed an hour. The bushrangers departed on the afternoon of the third day. That evening the bushrangers stuck up Thomas Grant's station on the Belubula River and burned it down as vengeance on the owner who had, on a previous occasion, given information to the police about their likely whereabouts.

In the early hours of Wednesday morning, 4 November 1863, Gilbert, Hall and O'Meally went to Robinson's public-house in Canowindra and knocked on the door. Upon opening, the publican William Robinson "was confronted by Ben Hall, holding two revolvers levelled at him". Hall asked if there were any police in the house and then the three bushrangers "entered the bar and drank nobblers". They stopped for about a quarter of an hour. When they left they took two bottles of port-wine and two of Old Tom gin, for which they offered to pay with a £5 note (but Robinson was unable to provide change for that amount).

On Tuesday, 21 June 1864, Ben Hall and two companions entered Pierce's store at Canowindra "without attracting notice". Finding the proprietor, John Pierce, alone they bailed him up and robbed him of about ten pounds in cash as well as goods from the store. In the belief he had further money hidden away the bushrangers burnt portions of the account books, but to no avail. They then took him six miles into the bush and tied him to a tree, threatening him with death and urging that he must procure £300 from his brother in Carcoar. Pierce was eventually freed when he was able to convince Hall and his men that no money could be obtained.

== Built environment ==
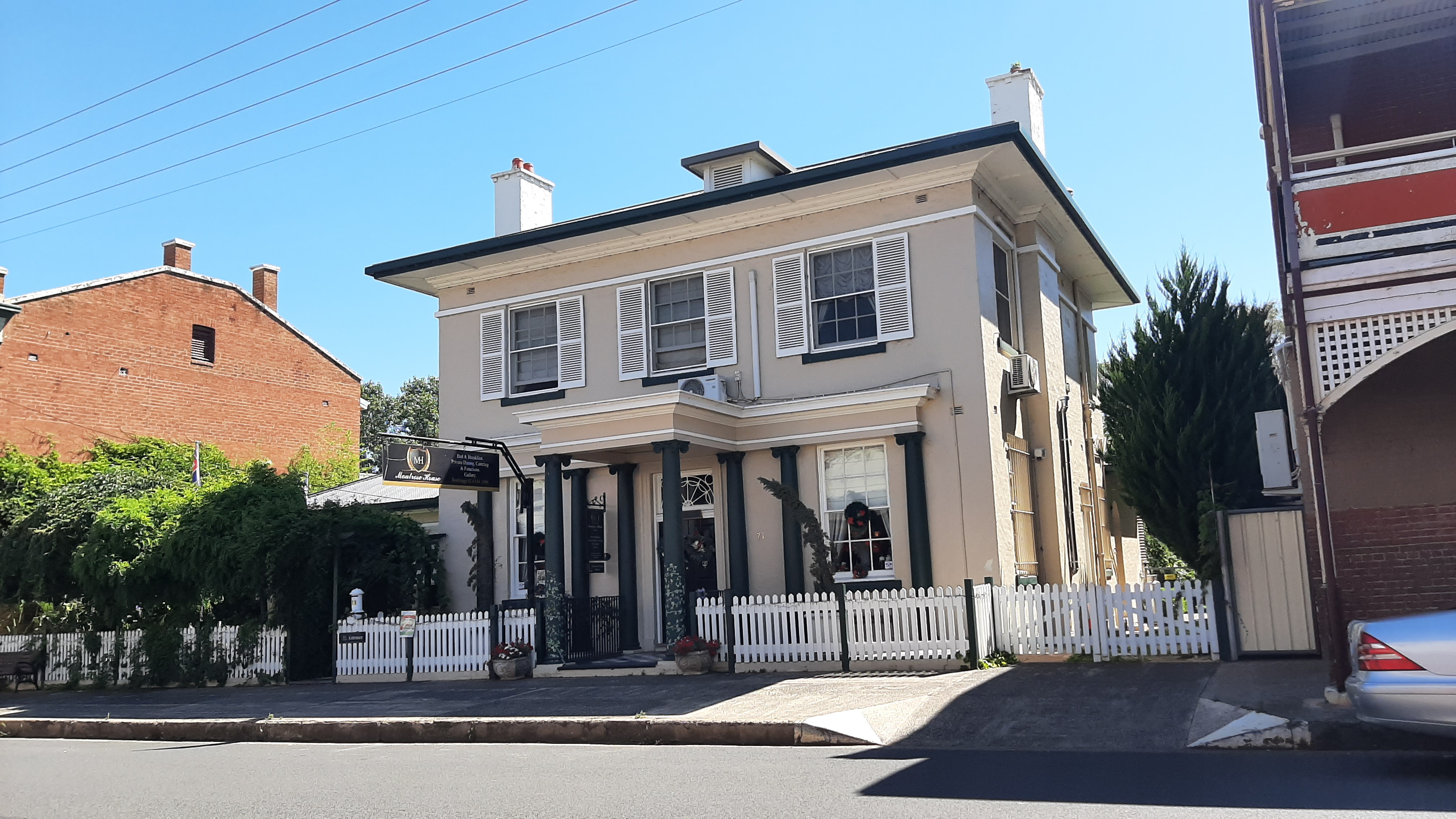
Montrose House, 71 Gaskill Street, designed by William Hardy Wilson

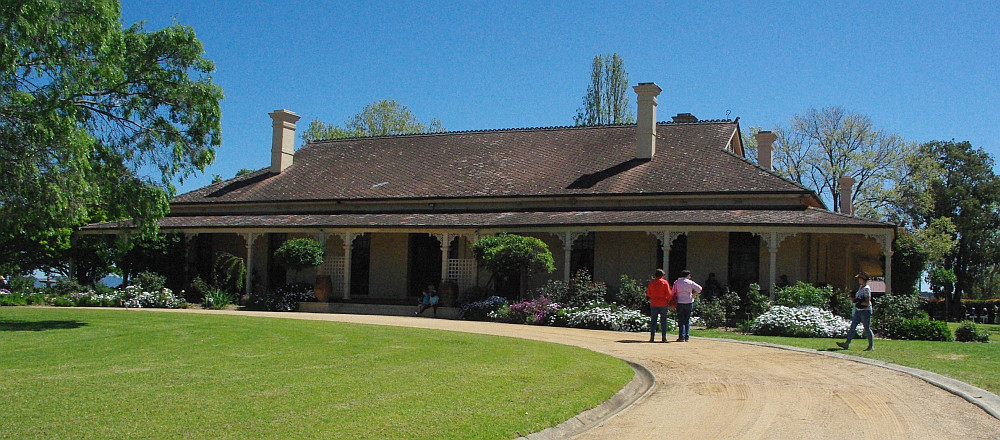
Noojee lea homestead

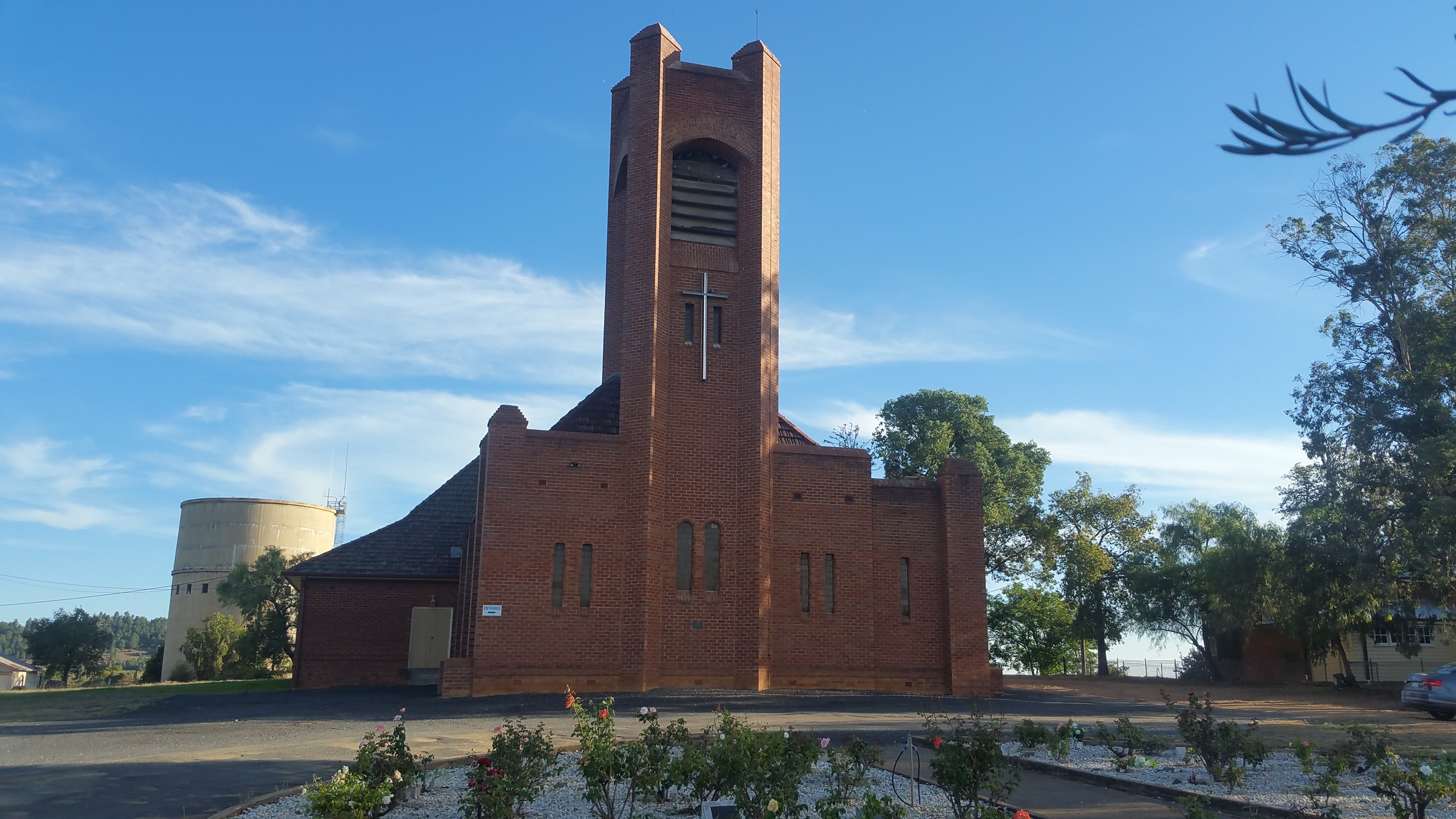
All Saints Anglican Church is one of several places of worship

- Gaskill Street: Today the main street, Gaskill Street, has an old-world air, with its kerbside verandah posts lining the dog-leg course of what was once a bullock team track. A total of 34 buildings and features in the town and environs are listed in the New South Wales State Heritage Register including 17 in or adjacent to Gaskill Street,
- The Swinging Bridge: In the early 20th century residents of South Canowindra then a village in Waugoola Shire, agitated for a bridge to be built at the end of Finn's Lane to give pedestrian access to the Canowindra business area, then situated in the then neighbouring Boree Shire. Eventually, a low-level footbridge financed by the two shires and local residents was completed early in 1928. The footbridge was washed away by a major flood event in 1934. In 1938 a new suspension bridge was built, locally known as the "Swinging Bridge". It has been modified and strengthened over the years to withstand the floods that were formerly regular occurrences in Canowindra.
- All Saints' Anglican Church Designed by noted ecclesiastical architect, Louis Williams All Saints' is a simple brick church. It was partially constructed in 1927–8 in a modified Gothic mode, when the sanctuary, choir and nave were built. It was subsequently finished to Williams' original design in 1959. The building houses several distinctive stained glass windows including the vesica window designed by the European trained artist, William Montgomery. One window "Jesus with the Doctors" was made by Christian Waller and installed in the 1930s and at least two windows were made by her husband, Napier Waller.
- Noojee Lea is a homestead located some 9 km south-west of the town on the Belubula River. The lands currently occupied by the house and demesne including more than 2000 hectares of rural property along Fish Fossil Drive were originally granted to Robert Read in 1869. Since 1981 the owners are the family of the prominent businessman and "BRW rich lister" Charles Curran AO. There have been several iterations of the garden including a design in 2010 by a local landscaper, Sally Bourne. Subsequently, further improvements on the layout were carried out by the Melbourne landscape designer Paul Bangay in 2015. The Curran family hold an open day at the homestead each year with proceeds benefiting the Canowindra Soldiers' Memorial Hospital. In April 2021 the gardens were featured in a segment by Graham Ross on the Better Homes and Gardens television program.
- The Big Peg Canowindra is home to one of Australia's big things located in a field just outside the town on the road to Cargo, New South Wales.

== Modern Canowindra ==
=== Demographics ===
Since early days of European settlement the population of the town has grown steadily.

Year	Population	Notes
1866	120	
1871	200–250	
1890	400	within one mile not counting Belmore 154 ( Mr Dry, Railway Inquiry 1890)
1901	416	Year of Federation
1911	1,535	Year after railway service opened
1933	1,716	Great Depression
1947	2,271	Post World War II
1951	1,747	Both mills had closed in 1950s
1954	1,915	Census
1961	1,749	Census
1966	1,717	
1971	1,679	Finns Store closed 1970
2001	2,340	Census data – Postal Area POA2804
2006	2,626	Census data – Postal Area POA2804
2011	2,381	Census

The State Suburb (SSC) of Canowindra (SSC 10796) completely encompasses Moorbel (SSC 12709), Nyrang Creek (SSC 13059) and nearly all of Billimari (SSC 10354). The combined population of these SSCs in 2016 was 2,673. For the 2021 census the ABS released the population data based on the 2804 Postal Area and the total population had increased to 2,832.

Census data for the "Urban Centre and Locality" which excludes Moorbel shows that between 2001 and 2016 the numbers have reduced from 1516 to 1395. However, the figures for wider area "State Suburb (SSC)" show a modest increase in the count from 2,126 in 2006 to 2258 in 2016.

In the Canowindra SSC, 88.2% of people were born in Australia and 91.5% of people only spoke English at home. The most common responses for religion were Catholic 29.7%, Anglican 26.6%, No Religion 16.5% and Uniting Church 8.9%.

=== Suburbs ===
There are two residential areas associated with the town: South Canowindra and Moorbel.

The "Village of South Canowindra" is a rural place located south of the Belubula River.

Moorbel is a locality about 3 km E by N of Canowindra and 4 km SW by W of South Canowindra. In February 1917, residents of Belmore petitioned the postal inspector at Parkes for a postal receiving station. Because a place named Belmore existed in Sydney, the residents submitted other names, with Moorbel finally being approved by the Department of Lands in July 1917. A local market is held at Moorbel Hall each month.

=== Canowindra Soldiers Memorial Hospital ===
Located in Browns Avenue, the hospital was built as a memorial for the men of the district who served in World War I. The foundation stone was laid in 1921 and the Soldier's Memorial Hospital opened, on Peace Day 28 June 1922. Part of the Western NSW Local Health District, the hospital has a limited number of acute and nursing home beds. The hospital also serves as a centre for various health services including rehabilitation and emergency. The emergency department was redeveloped in 2017.

=== Education ===
The town has three schools: a state co-educational Years 7–12 high school, Canowindra High School, a state K–6 primary school, Canowindra Public School and St Edwards Primary School, a Roman Catholic systemic K–6 primary school.

Early childhood education is provided by the Canowindra Pre-school Kindergarten Inc. (a registered association that commenced operations in 1958) and registered home based educators managed by Cabonne/Blayney Family Day Care Service.

=== Service, social and community ===
There is an active Lions Club. The branch of the Country Women's Association (CWA) which meets in its own hall with modern catering facilities was founded in 1924.

A community garden which is open to all residents and visitors is managed by a local committee.

The Canowindra Services & Citizens Club Ltd is a registered club providing a wide range of facilities for members and the community including a bistro and a community hall which can be hired by the public.

The Canowindra Garden Club organises talks and visits to gardens throughout the region raising money for charity. The club donated $6,000 to the Canowindra Soldiers Memorial Hospital in 2018.

The Canowindra Historical Society operates the Canowindra Historical Museum which is located in the town's main street next the Age of Fishes Museum. On display are a shepherd's hut circa 1828, Harold Boyd's complete dental surgery, a wedding gown collection from 1881 to 1982, a reconstructed wool shed, wheat harvesters collection from 1843, photo collection and the Pioneers Wall.

Canowindra Pastoral Agricultural and Horticultural Association manages the town's showgrounds and organises the annual show which has been held since 1900.

=== The Miracle House ===
When the special support needs of a local family with triplets diagnosed with a congenital form of muscular dystrophy and restrictive lung disease were identified in 2013, residents of the town and the wider central western NSW region started fundraising with the aim, inter alia, of building a house with appropriate design features for the use of the family as well as providing ongoing support. A charity was registered in 2016 Since then cash donations and in kind have been raised with the family moving into their new house in March 2018. In 2021 following further fund raising a hydrotherapy pool was installed at the house.

=== Culture ===
Organised by the Canowindra Fine Music Group, The Baroque Music Festival is an annual presentation of baroque and related music performances at various venues around the town.

The town's branch of the CWA presents a "Sunday Serenade" at All Saints Church annually which showcases local performance talent. Monies raised are used to fund music and voice scholarships for local school children.

=== Sport and recreation ===
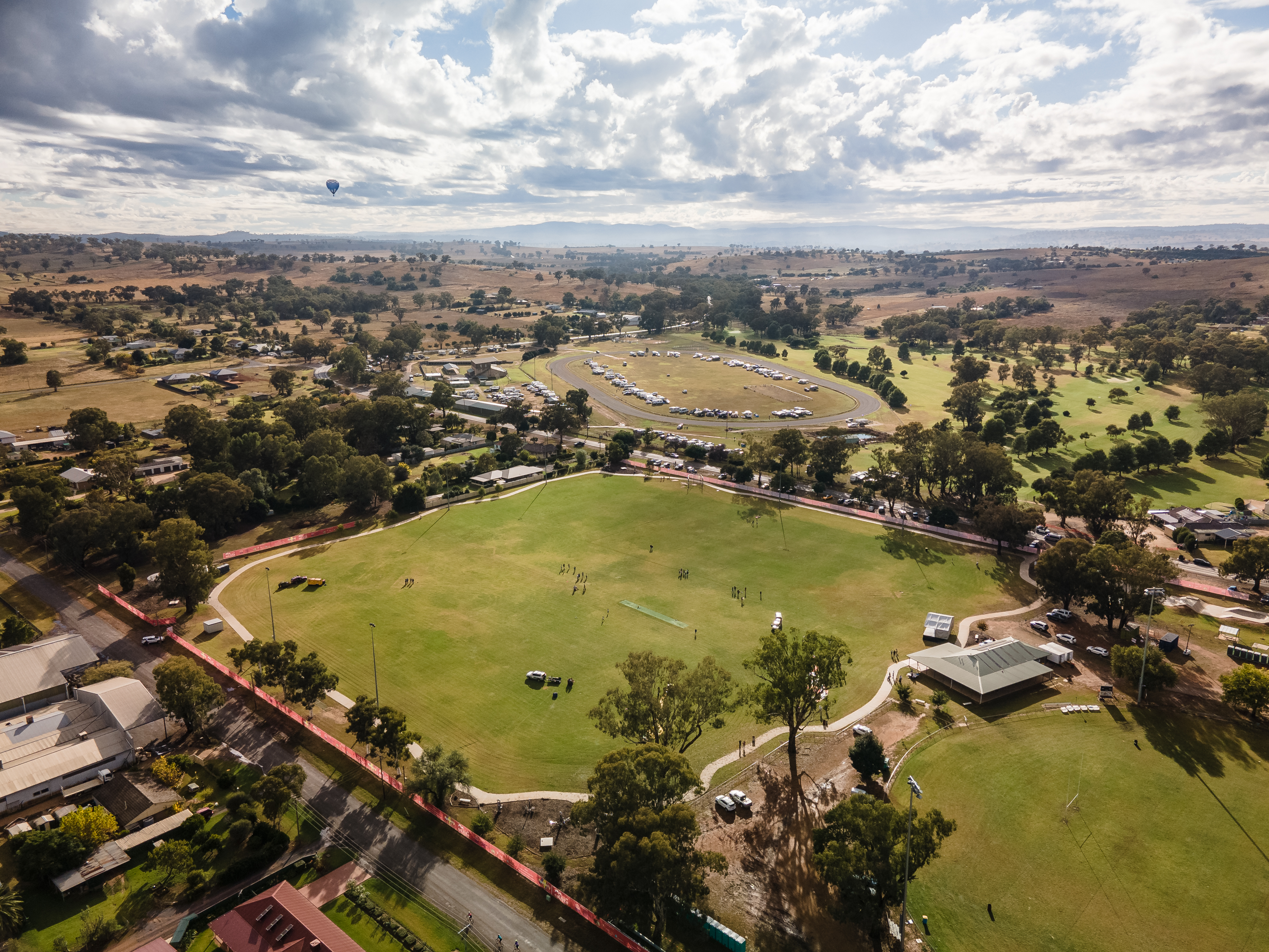
Canowindra Oval (front) and Showgrounds (background)

A number of sports clubs provide facilities and organised competitions. Such sports include Rugby league (men and women's playing as Canowindra Tigers), Rugby union (Canowindra Pythons), Cricket (Canowindra Sixers), Tennis, Lawn Bowls, Squash, Golf and Swimming. For younger age groups there is a pony club which meets fortnightly at the showground and a Little Athletics centre which participates in the Central Tablelands zone.

The town has a council maintained sports oval with floodlighting, Tom Clyburn Oval. At the oval there are well maintained fitness stations, basketball courts and skateboarding facilities.

A nine-hole golf course is supported by a registered club.

Cabonne Council owns and operates the swimming pool which is open from late Spring to mid Autumn.

=== RV Friendly Town ===
An essential facility sought after by caravaners

Since 2016 Canowindra has been recognised by the Campervan and Motorhome Club of Australia (CMCA) as an RV Friendly Town. Facilities for caravaners and campers include low cost camp sites, easy access to the retail area, access to water and a free user friendly waste dump point.

=== Media ===
Radio stations Radio stations with transmissions able to be received in Canowindra include-

AM band:

- ABC Local Radio 549 AM

FM band:

- Hit Network 105.9 FM
- Triple M - Central West 105.1 FM
- Roccy FM 99.5 FM
- ABC Classic 102.7 FM
- ABC Radio National 104.3 FM
- FM107.5 107.5 FM
- Triple J (2JJJ) 101.9 FM

Television Canowindra receives five free-to-air television networks and their affiliates which are broadcast from nearby Mt Canobolas:

- ABC – ABC TV, ABC TV Plus, ABC Me and ABC News
- SBS – SBS ONE, SBS Viceland, NITV, SBS Food, SBS World Movies and SBS WorldWatch
- Prime7 – Prime7, 7Two, 7mate, Ishop TV and 7flix
- Southern Cross 10 – 10 HD, 10 Bold, 10 Peach, 10 Shake and Sky News Regional
- WIN – 9HD, 9Gem, 9Go!, 9Life and Gold
- Half-hour long regional news bulletins are broadcast by Prime7 and WIN but Southern Cross 10 instead airs local news updates from its Hobart studios.

Subscription television service Foxtel is available in Canowindra and the surrounding area via satellite transmission.

Internet NBN FTTN internet service is available to most of the built up area of the town via a number of reseller ISPs.

=== Wineries ===
Canowindra is considered to be part of the Cowra wine region which is a sub-area of the Central Ranges wine zone. There are eight wineries centred on the town, some of which offer cellar door sales.

=== Other ===
The Royal Hotel is on the site of another inn owned by Robinson and the plaque on the wall indicates present day understanding that this was the inn where Ben Hall's bushranging gang had their spree.

Other notable buildings include the nursing home, the Junction Hotel, Finn's Building, the Victoria Hotel, the former Bank of NSW and the former CBC Bank. The Trading Post, a homewares shop, won the inland tourism award for 2006.

== Ballooning ==
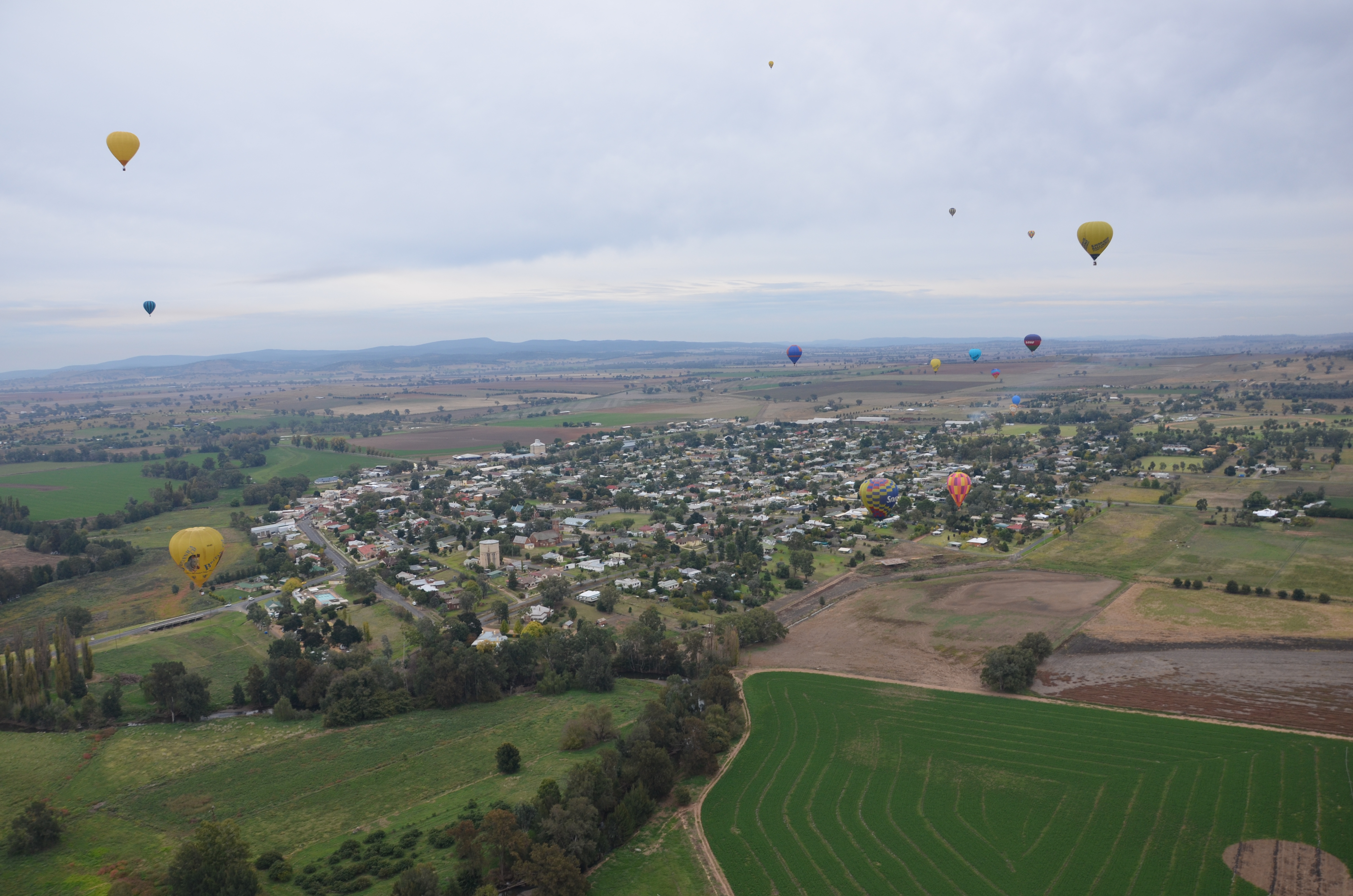
Balloons over Canowindra during the 2011 Australian Hot Air Balloon Championships

Canowindra is also popularly known as the Ballooning Capital of Australia.

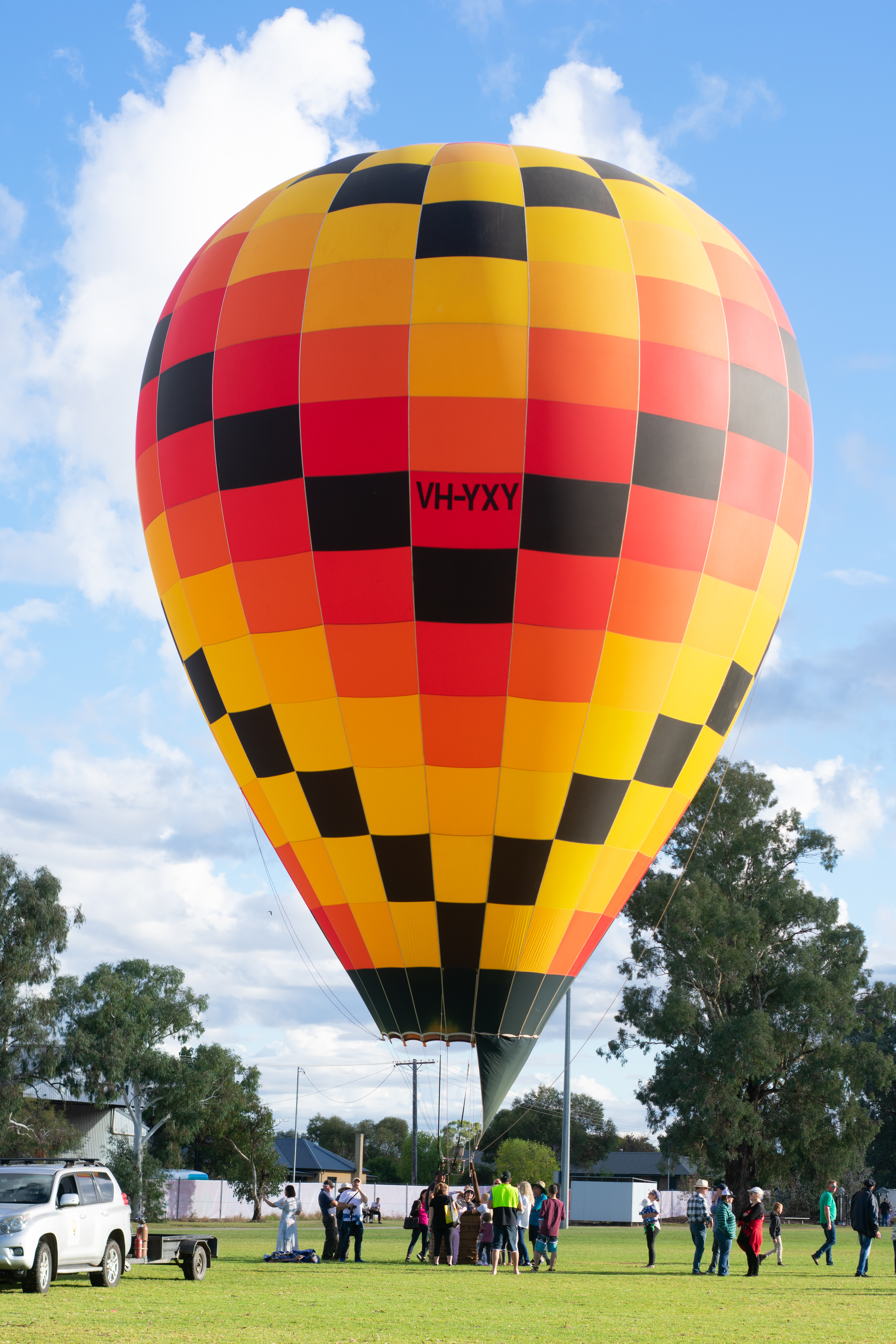
Hot air balloon in Canowindra Sports Oval

In April 1988, an endorsed bicentennial activity the "Canowindra 88 Bicentennial Balloon Championships" was held in the town. The 1988 event was also the Australian National Championship under the auspices of the Australian Ballooning Federation. The champion in 1988 was John Wallington. Subsequently, the 2011, 2013 and 2014 championships were also held in Canowindra.

From 1995 to 2005, an event known as Marti's Balloon Fiesta was held in Canowindra. Funded in large part by Frank Hackett-Jones, it was primarily a fun event designed to bring together balloonists and spectators from local, national and international locations in a celebration of Central West hospitality and goodwill.

Canowindra Challenge event 2018

The Canowindra International Balloon Challenge is the largest ballooning event in Australia and takes place in Canowindra in April. In 2010, the Challenge created a local balloon event that has grown to where it now attracts pilots and balloons from around the globe to build upon the principles of Marti's Fiesta, bringing businesses together to support a week-long event of ballooning competitions and skill-based activities. The use of location-enabled (GPS), point-of-view camera technologies was combined with live-to-web broadcasts via an online streaming platform for viewers to share in the spectacle and to join in the event virtually and for free.

A balloon glow is held as part of the event along with a local food and wine market based on the 100-mile principle where the products must be made or produced within 100 miles (160 km) of Canowindra. The last Sunday of the event also features a 'key grab', where pilots test their skill in an attempt to grab a large key from the top of a 10 metres (33 ft) pole.

This event coincides with food and wine events which brings participation from the greater Cabonne and surrounding districts during April each year. Canowindra also hosted the Australian National Balloon Championships in 2011, 2013 (awarded silver at the NSW State Tourism Awards in the Festivals and Events category) and 2014, creating a larger, more competitive event. In 2014, the event went fully international with pilots from Japan, the United States of America, Russia, Brazil and the United Kingdom competing.

In 2020, the Balloon Challenge was cancelled due to the COVID-19 pandemic. The 2021 event was held as scheduled on 26 April to 1 May.

== Fossils ==
The John Andrews designed museum building

Canowindra is the site of one of the world's great fossil discoveries from the late Devonian period. A chance discovery by a road worker in 1955 uncovered a sandstone slab packed with 114 fish fossils. This slab was from the Mandagery Sandstone, dating from the Devonian period in the Paleozoic era, more than 360 million years old. Harold Fletcher of the Australian Museum, Sydney travelled to Canowindra with his colleague Mr. K. Mayfield, Preparator at the Museum, and Mr. E.O. Rayner, Geologist of the Geological Survey of New South Wales. Their aim was to view the fossil slabs from the Devonian Period, turned up during road work. With help from the locals, several slabs of quartzite rock were loaded up and taken to Sydney where Museum Preparators carefully and methodically removed the covering matrix on the "Canowindra slab' on some of the specimens to more clearly reveal their features.

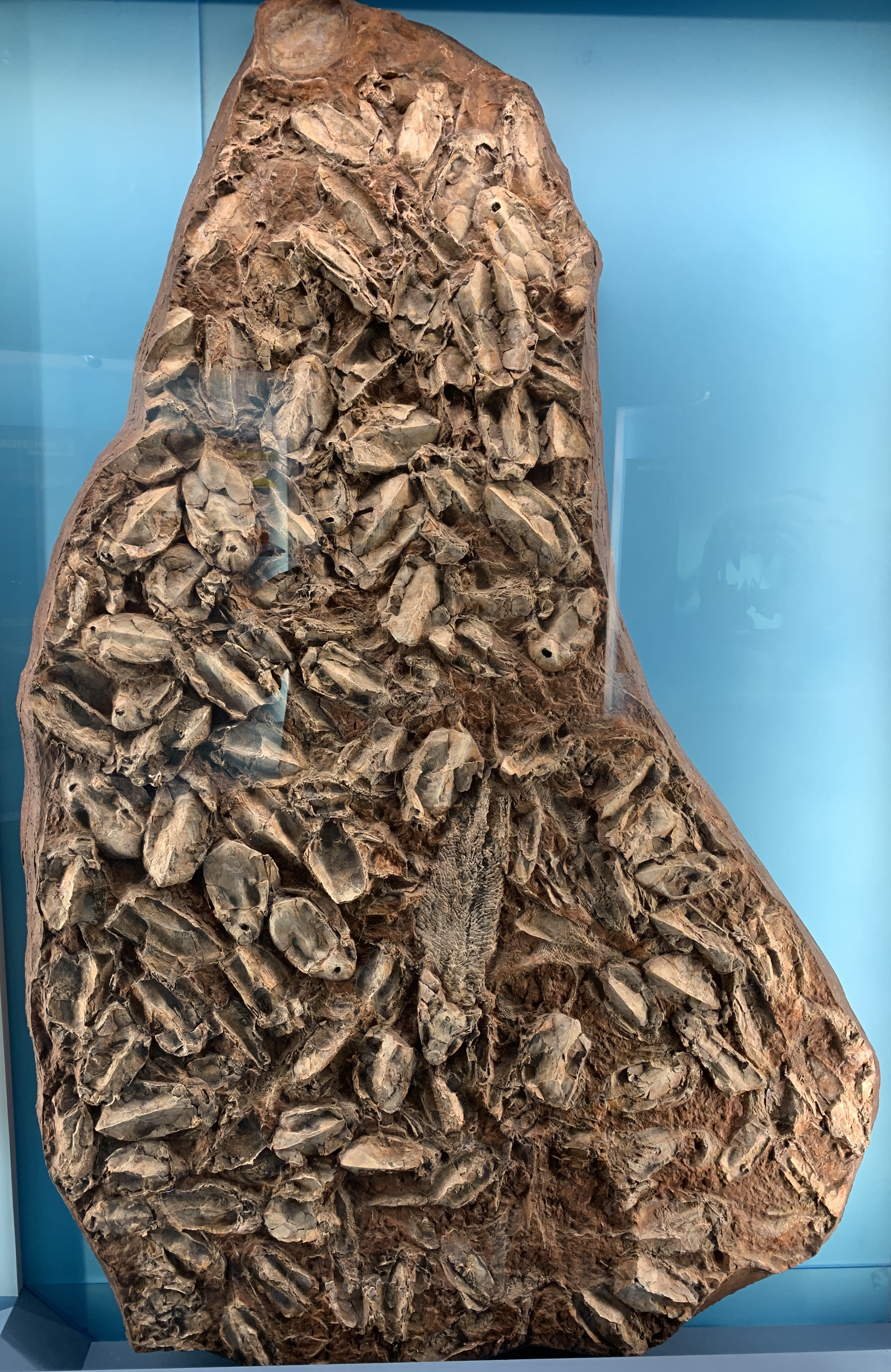
Cast of the slab found in 1956, that preserves 114 fish individuals trapped in a dried up freshwater pool.

The fish had been buried when trapped in a pool of water that dried up, stranding a school of armoured antiarch placoderms in the species Remigolepis walkeri and Bothriolepis yeungae. Other important fossils include Canowindra grossi (a lobe-finned crossopterygian fish, the largest fish in the slab), two rare juvenile arthrodire placoderms and two small and inconspicuous juveniles of the Groenlandaspis genus.

No further fossils had been recovered until January 1993, when a trial dig under the supervision of paleontologist Dr Alex Ritchie on the site using an excavator rediscovered the fossil stratum, where the mass mortality of fishes was preserved in detail (see Lagerstätte). Specimens can be viewed in the specially established The Age of Fishes Museum, with scientific support and funding from the Australian Museum. The Canowindra site has now been listed as part of Australia's National Heritage because of its international scientific importance.

Work commenced in 1999 to build the Age of Fishes Museum at Canowindra, designed by the Australian architect, John Andrews. The 1956 slab, previously housed in Sydney, was returned in 2006 to be permanently displayed in the Canowindra museum. In 2019 the fossil bearing rock slabs that were previously stored under the grandstand at the Canowindra Showgrounds were transported to a purpose-built storage facility next to the Age of Fishes Museum.

In 2013 the naturalist and wildlife broadcaster Sir David Attenborough visited the Age of Fishes Museum and described the collection of fossils as "world class".

=== State emblem ===
The official NSW State Fossil Emblem is Mandageria fairfaxi. The 370 million year old fossil fish from the Canowindra Fish Bed was named as the NSW State Fossil Emblem in 2015.

== Notable Canowindrans ==
- Kath Anderson – member of New South Wales Legislative Council from 1973 to 1981 was born in and received her early education in the town.
- George Douglas Bassett – (1888–1972) – NSW Legislative Council member 1932–1964. Educated at Canowindra State School and worked on his father's farm in Canowindra.
- Ron Boden - rugby league footballer who coached and played for Canowindra in from 1965 to 1967.
- Col Buchanan - Australian musician and entertainer
- Lisa Corrigan – Australian athletics representative, Olympic Athlete and Australian one mile record holder.
- Stanley Drummond (1884-1943) - Methodist minister in Canowindra 1919-1922 who was a driving force behind the building of the Soldiers' Memorial Hospital who later went on to found the Royal Far West Children's Health Scheme.
- Hubert Clement 'Butt' Finn (1900–1952) – Australian rugby league footballer of the 1920s and physician.
- Julia Finn – member for Granville in the New South Wales Legislative Assembly from 2015 was brought up in Canowindra.
- Peter Fitzgerald – rugby league footballer for St. George, Eastern Suburbs and Port Kembla.
- Neville Gosson – rugby league footballer for St. George and Eastern Suburbs was captain-coach of the Canowindra side in 1952. In the 1980s he participated in the first single handed round the world yacht race.
- Gordi (Sophie Payten) – recording artist
- James Grant – Australian representative Rugby union footballer
- Rhyan Grant – footballer currently playing for Sydney FC in the A-League. Up to March 2022 he made 21 appearances for the Socceroos.
- Elwyn Lynn – artist, author, art critic and curator
- Alicia McCormack Smith – Australian representative water polo player who won medals at two Olympic games and was a member of the 2006 FINA Women's Water Polo World Cup gold medal winning team and the 2007 World Aquatics Championships silver medal team.
- Thomas George Murray (1885–1969) – NSW Legislative Council member 1921–1958. Started as a butcher's boy, formed a stock and station agency acquiring large property holdings.
- Rex Norman (1891–1961) – representative rugby league footballer who played for several (NSWRL) clubs and who finished his career as coach of the town's football and cricket teams.
- Amelia Rygate – independent member of the NSW Legislative Council and spouse of Gerald Rygate
- Gerald Rygate – citizen soldier, farmer and member of the NSW Legislative Council
- Paddy Stokes – politician and publican who ran the Victoria Hotel in the 1930s
- Bishop Douglas Warren (1919–2013) – Roman Catholic cleric was born and raised in the town.

== In popular culture ==
- The town's bushranger history inspired the 1863 play Canowindra; or, The Darky Highwayman and the Settlers’ Homes on the Abercrombie described in the theatre's advertising as "a new local Drama, in two acts, full of startling situations and effects, on the events of the present day...".
- From 1934 to 1936 at the height of the Great Depression, Lewis Rodd, a noted Christian Socialist and pacifist, was a teacher at the then Canowindra Central School. He and his wife, Kylie Tennant, lodged at the Canowindra Hotel in Gaskill Street. It was during this time Tennant wrote her first novel "Tiburon" (first published in serial form in The Bulletin 1935) about the "suspicions and mores of life in a country town", which the author stated to have been based, in part at least, on Canowindra. The novel won the S. H. Prior Memorial Prize in 1935.
- The 1991, Inspector Morse episode "Promised Land" was set and shot in Canowindra.
- Circa 1994 singer-songwriter Col Buchanan wrote and recorded "Canowindra Means Home" for an album of songs released in conjunction with the annual Balloon Festival.
- The 2015, Australian–Irish drama suspense film Strangerland featured Canowindra as the Australian desert town where characters Catherine (Nicole Kidman) and Matthew Parker's (Joseph Fiennes) lives are flung into crisis when they discover their two teenage kids, Tommy and Lily, have mysteriously disappeared just before a massive dust storm hits. This film was directed by Kim Farrant and written by Michael Kinirons and Fiona Seres.
- The 2005 action–adventure–comedy film Kangaroo Jack featured scenes from the Canowindra area as well as a scene featuring the Royal Hotel. The Royal Hotel itself was never actually used in the movie as a replica was built in studios in Sydney for the scene.
- A local Holden car collector, the late Charlie McCarron, was featured in an ABC-sponsored short film project "My Back Roads" talking about the sale of his collection. Until that sale his collection had been displayed in the Canowindra Motors Holden Museum.
- In January 2018, Canowindra was featured in the sixth episode of Series 3 of the ABC TV program Back Roads. The program examined the townspeople's efforts to recover from a rural economic downturn, the annual Canowindra International Balloon Challenge and the assistance provided to the Read family. The episode achieved an OzTAM capital city viewership of 599,000, outrating some sports telecasts.
- In January 2018 an episode of the Seven Network's "Sydney Weekender" show was filmed in the town, The segment aired in March 2018.
- In April 2018, part of an episode of ABC TV's "Escape to the Country - Australia" was filmed in the town.
- In April 2018, the International Balloon Challenge Balloon Glow event was live streamed into China by Xinhua News Agency on their social media channels.
- In May 2021 reporters from CNN featured the town and residents in a report on the 2021 NSW mouse plague.
- In December 2023, the ABC Science Show re-broadcast, after nearly 50 years, a purported interview with "1963 Nobel Prize winner", Sir Clarence Lovejoy, which included the assertion that Lovejoy had been born and raised in Canowindra.
