= Back Roads (TV series) =

2015–present Australian regional-focused TV series

- Presented by: Heather Ewart (2015-2025); Lisa Millar (2025-present)
- Starring: Heather Ewart; Paul West; Lisa Millar; Kristy O’Brien; Craig Quartermaine; Joe O'Brien; Albert Wiggan; Kerry Staight; Rae Johnston; Kurt Fearnley; Tom Forrest; Tania Bale; Amanda Shalala; Marta Dusseldorp; Annie Louey; Anna Daniels; Myf Warhurst
- Theme music composer: George Servanis
- Opening theme: “Back to my home”
- Country of origin: Australia
- Original language: English
- No. of seasons: 11
- No. of episodes: 163

Original release
- Network: ABC
- Release: 30 November 2015 – present

Back Roads is an Australian factual television series that explores life in regional towns across the country. The observational documentary premiered on ABC on 30 November 2015.

From its debut until 2025, the program was hosted by Australian political journalist Heather Ewart. After the conclusion of Series 11, Ewart stepped down, and Lisa Millar—a recurring guest presenter since 2019—took over as host. The series also regularly features a rotating lineup of guest presenters. Season 12 is set to return on 5 March 2025.

The show’s theme song is performed by Australian singer‑songwriter Rebecca Barnard.

== Episodes ==
=== Series 1 ===
- Series 1 Ep 1 "Ceduna" (First broadcast 30 Nov 2015)

Ceduna is a Nullarbor frontier town on the Great Australian Bight, where breaking conventions is the rule.

- Series 1 Ep 2 "Winton" (First broadcast 07 Dec 2015)

Winton is a western Queensland town in "Waltzing Matilda" country, where you can spend a day at the races, go digging for dinosaur bones and meet a former Governor-General of Australia, Dame Quentin Bryce.

- Series 1 Ep 3 "Yackandandah" (First broadcast 14 Dec 2015)

Yackandandah, in the foothills of Victoria's high country, is a picture-perfect gold rush town which gambled on itself and won.

- Series 1 Ep 4 "Karumba "(First broadcast 21 Dec 2015)

Karumba is a remote fishing town in Far North Queensland, where locals love the isolation.

- Series 1 Ep 5 "Birchip" (First broadcast 28 Dec 2015)

Birchip, in the Victorian Mallee, is a town in the heart of wheat country which thrives on bucking trends.

- Series 1 Ep 6 "Derby" (First broadcast 04 Jan 2016)

Derby, in the Kimberley region of Western Australia, is rich in cultural diversity.

- Series 1 Ep 7 "Queenstown" (First broadcast 11 Jan 2016)

Meet the Young Tasmanian of the year, Adam Mostogl, and explore the stories from the community of Queenstown, in the West Coast region of Tasmania.

- Series 1 Ep 8 "Clarence River" (First broadcast 18 Jan 2016)

The Clarence River is in the Northern Rivers district of New South Wales.

=== Series 2 ===
- Series 2 Ep 1 "Mundulla"

Mundulla is a tiny South Australian community which cherishes its old world values, but doesn't mind a bit of healthy competition.

- Series 2 Ep 2 "Normanton"

A hairdresser and her 76 year old apprentice take a ten day road-trip from Innisfail to Normanton in Queensland's Gulf country.

- Series 2 Ep 3 "Mallacoota"

Mallacoota is a remote place at the end of the road on the far eastern tip of Victoria. It is known for its natural beauty and wilderness, its isolation has bred a determination in the town to look after its own.

- Series 2 Ep 4 "Thursday Island"

Thursday Island is a laid-back paradise but its isolation can present problems. Locals are rising to the challenge and are carving out a new future

- Series 2 Ep 5 "Katanning"

The sheep and wheat town of Katanning lays out the welcome mat and shows how it has transformed itself, holding some delightful surprises.

- Series 2 Ep 6 "Hermannsburg"

Hermannsburg (known as Ntaria in Western Arrarnta language), the birthplace of Albert Namatjira, is nurturing both culture and creativity in its young people.

- Series 2 Ep 7 "White Cliffs"

White Cliffs is a tiny outback town known for opal mining and underground dugouts but the community is also full of colourful surprises.

- Series 2 Ep 8 "Cygnet

Cygnet is the seaside hamlet of southern Tasmania's Huon Valley, undergoing some big changes with runaways from the city flooding in to town.

- Series 2 Ep 9 "Harrow"

Harrow is a creative community that took to heart the mantra "reinvent or perish" and found unique ways to bring new people and fresh ideas into the town.

=== Series 3 ===
- Series 3 Ep 1 "Corryong"

A bucket-load of beauty and a fascinating history haven't been enough to cement Corryong's success but that's changing, with some young people starting to move back.

- Series 3 Ep 2 "Dunalley"

Dunalley was almost wiped out by bushfires in 2013 but instead of destroying them, the tragedy has proven to be a catalyst for many people to pursue a new path.

- Series 3 Ep 3 "Oodnadatta" (Part 1)

Heading along the legendary Oodnadatta Track, the journey begins in the small town of Marree, where the Oodnadatta and Birdsville Tracks meet.

- Series 3 Ep 4 "Oodnadatta" (Part 2)

Continuing along the Oodnadatta Track and hitching a lift with the truck-driver who delivers essential supplies and meeting the Pink Roadhouse owner, as well as the workers at an isolated cattle station.

- Series 3 Ep 5 "Robe"

Robe is a fishing port on South Australia's Limestone coast that is known for helping others through their community run project 'Robe to Recovery' which helps War Veterans take time off from their everyday life.

- Series 3 Ep 6 "Canowindra"

Known as the hot-air ballooning capital of Australia, the Canowindra community is looking to reinvent its future.

- Series 3 Ep 7 "Pine Creek"

Pine Creek is a pioneering outback town in the Northern Territory on the fringes of Kakadu National Park which has long been a boom or bust mining area.

- Series 3 Ep 8 "Pilbara"

The remarkable locals of the Pilbara region of Western Australia are driving change as the mining boom ends.

=== Series 4 ===
The Series 4 episodes are:

- Series 4 Ep 1 "Waterfall Way" (New South Wales)
- Series 4 Ep 2 "Murray River, South Australia"
- Series 4 Ep 3 "Natimuk" (Victoria)
- Series 4 Ep 4 "Scottsdale" (Tasmania)
- Series 4 Ep 5 "Thallon" (Queensland)
- Series 4 Ep 6 "Robinvale" (Victoria)
- Series 4 Ep 7 "Tiwi Islands" (Northern Territory)
- Series 4 Ep 8 "Nyngan" (New South Wales)
- Series 4 Ep 9 "The Greengrocer" (Queensland)
- Series 4 Ep 10 "Lightning Ridge" (New South Wales)
- Series 4 Ep 11 "Furneaux Islands" (Tasmania)
- Series 4 Ep 12 "Beaufort" (Victoria)
- Series 4 Ep 13 "Marble Bar" (Western Australia)
- Series 4 Ep 14 "The Coorong" (South Australia)
- Series 4 Ep 15 "Finke" (Northern Territory)
- Series 4 Ep 16 "Windorah" (Queensland)

=== Series 5 ===
The Series 5 episodes are:

- Series 5 Ep 1: "Glen Helen Ride" in Alice Springs (Northern Territory)
- Series 5 Ep 2: "Tolmie" (Victoria)
- Series 5 Ep 3: "Woolgoolga" (New South Wales)
- Series 5 Ep 4: "Burketown" (Queensland)
- Series 5 Ep 5: "Kulin" (Western Australia)
- Series 5 Ep 6: "Fish Creek" (Victoria)
- Series 5 Ep 7: "Flinders Ranges" (South Australia)
- Series 5 Ep 8: "Riverina" (New South Wales)
- Series 5 Ep 9: "Snow journey" in the Australian Alps (Victoria and New South Wales)
- Series 5 Ep 10: "Bullo Shire" (Queensland)
- Series 5 Ep 11: "Wynyard "(Tasmania)
- Series 5 Ep 12: "Clunes" (Victoria)
- Series 5 Ep 13: "Koroit" (Victoria)
- Series 5 Ep 14: "Menindee" (New South Wales)
- Series 5 Ep 15: "Show Town" (Queensland), about life in a travelling show
- Series 5 Ep 16: "Jabiru" (Northern Territory)

=== Series 6 ===
The Series 6 (2020) episodes are:

- Series 6 Ep 1: "Nullarbor, Part 1:The Endless Horizon" (South Australia)
- Series 6 Ep 2: "Nullarbor, Part 2: Turning Back Time" (Western Australia)
- Series 6 Ep 3: "Rokewood-Corindhap" (Victoria)
- Series 6 Ep 4: "Biloela" (Queensland) and the town's campaign on behalf of asylum seekers Priya and Nades
- Series 6 Ep 5: "Penguin" (Tasmania)
- Series 6 Ep 6: "Girgarre" (Victoria)
- Series 6 Ep 7: "Dampier Peninsula" (Western Australia)
- Series 6 Ep 8: "Omeo" (Victoria)

=== Series 7 ===
The Series 7 (2021) episodes are:

- Series 7 Ep 1: "Cobar"
- Series 7 Ep 2: "Kyogle"
- Series 7 Ep 3: "Cooper Pedy" with Poh Ling Yeow
- Series 7 Ep 4: "Conquering Isolation Special"
- Series 7 Ep 5: "Eugowra"
- Series 7 Ep 6: "Agnes Water & Seventeen Seventy" with Paul West
- Series 7 Ep 7: "Local Heroes Special"
- Series 7 Ep 8: "Back to Mallacoota"
- Series 7 Ep 9: "Cooktown" with Craig Quartermaine
- Series 7 Ep 10: "Tenterfield"
- Series 7 Ep 11: "Adelaide River"
- Series 7 Ep 12: "Central Highlands, Tasmania" with Lisa Millar
- Series 7 Ep 13: "The Mallee"
- Series 7 Ep 14: "Cloncurry" with Kristy O'Brien
- Series 7 Ep 15: "Rupanyup & Minyip"
- Series 7 Ep 16: "Strahan"

=== Series 8 ===
The Series 8 (2022) episodes are:

- Series 8 Ep 1: "The Great Australian Road Trip"
- Series 8 Ep 2: "Tom Price"
- Series 8 Ep 3: "Cradle Mountain" with Joe O'Brien
- Series 8 Ep 4: "Boulia"
- Series 8 Ep 5: "Eyre Peninsula" with Paul West
- Series 8 Ep 6: "Port Campbell"
- Series 8 Ep 7: "Charleville" with Kristy O'Brien
- Series 8 Ep 8: "Longford"
- Series 8 Ep 9: "Leeton"
- Series 8 Ep 10: "Katherine" with Albert Wiggan
- Series 8 Ep 11: "Hebel"
- Series 8 Ep 12: "Tumut"
- Series 8 Ep 13: "French Island" with Lisa Millar
- Series 8 Ep 14: "Leonora"
- Series 8 Ep 15: "Pinnaroo" with Kerry Staight
- Series 8 Ep 16: "King Island"

=== Series 9 ===
The Series 9 (2023) episodes are:

- Series 9 Ep 1: "The Great Australian Pub"
- Series 9 Ep 2: "Brunette Downs"
- Series 9 Ep 3: "Marrawah" with Paul West
- Series 9 Ep 4: "Quilpie"
- Series 9 Ep 5: "Ord River" with Rae Johnston
- Series 9 Ep 6: "Pyramid Hill & Nhill"
- Series 9 Ep 7: "Tennant Creek" with Kurt Fearnley
- Series 9 Ep 8: "Musical Road Trip through Western Queensland" with Josh Arnold
- Series 9 Ep 9: "Strzelecki Track (Part 1)" (South Australia)
- Series 9 Ep 10: "Strzelecki Track (Part 2)"
- Series 9 Ep 11: "Great South West Walk" (Victoria) with Lisa Millar
- Series 9 Ep 12: "Walhalla"
- Series 9 Ep 13: "Cunnamulla" with Tom Forrest
- Series 9 Ep 14: "Darkan"
- Series 9 Ep 15: "Boot Scootin' Tour" (Tasmania)
- Series 9 Ep 16: "Rabaul" (Papua New Guinea) with Tania Bale

=== Series 10 ===
The Series 10 (2024) episodes are:

- Series 10 Ep 1: "Brunswick Heads"
- Series 10 Ep 2: "Naracoorte" with Amanda Shalala
- Series 10 Ep 3: "Uralla"
- Series 10 Ep 4: "Home Hill"
- Series 10 Ep 5: "Timber Creek" with Kristy O'Brien
- Series 10 Ep 6: "Wheatbelt Animal Carers" (Western Australia)
- Series 10 Ep 7: "Gemfields" (Queensland) with Lisa Millar
- Series 10 Ep 8: "Eugowra Recovery"
- Series 10 Ep 9: "East Arnhem Land (Part 1)" (Northern Territory) with Rae Johnston
- Series 10 Ep 10: "East Arnhem Land (Part 2)"
- Series 10 Ep 11: "Gunbower & Torrumbarry"
- Series 10 Ep 12: "Tasman Peninsula" with Joe O'Brien
- Series 10 Ep 13: "Braidwood"
- Series 10 Ep 14: "Julia Creek"
- Series 10 Ep 15: "Tarkine" (Tasmania) with Marta Dusseldorp
- Series 10 Ep 16: "Kurri Kurri"
- Series 10 Ep 17: "Bass Coast" (Victoria)
- Series 10 Ep 18: "Heysen Trail" (South Australia)
- Series 10 Ep 19: "90 Mile Beach"
- Series 10 Ep 20: "South Burnett Rail Trail" (Queensland) with Lisa Millar
- Series 10 Ep 21: "Ongerup"
- Series 10 Ep 22: "Charlton"
- Series 10 Ep 23: "Nimmitabel"
- Series 10 Ep 24: "Beechworth" with Annie Louey
- Series 10 Ep 25: "Port MacDonnell" with Tom Forrest
- Series 10 Ep 26: "Evandale"

=== Series 11 ===
The Series 11 (2025) episodes are:

- Series 11 Ep 1: "Andamooka & Roxby Downs"
- Series 11 Ep 2: "Camperdown" with Kerry Staight
- Series 11 Ep 3: "Theodore" with Anna Daniels
- Series 11 Ep 4: "Kandos"
- Series 11 Ep 5: "Outback Way (Part 1)" (Northern Territory) with Lisa Millar
- Series 11 Ep 6: "Outback Way (Part 2)"
- Series 11 Ep 7: "Kangaroo Island" with Paul West
- Series 11 Ep 8: "Great Keppel" (Queensland)
- Series 11 Ep 9: "Hilltops Region" (New South Wales) with Lisa Millar
- Series 11 Ep 10: "Wheelbarrow Way" (Queensland) with Joe O'Brien
- Series 11 Ep 11: "Bibbulmun Track" (Western Australia) with Rae Johnston
- Series 11 Ep 12: "Tassie Woodchoppers" with Lisa Millar
- Series 11 Ep 13: "Lucindale" with Kristy O’Brien
- Series 11 Ep 14: "Tambo" with Tom Forrest
- Series 11 Ep 15: "Gippsland Lakes" with Lisa Millar
- Series 11 Ep 16: "Van Life (Part 1)" (Queensland) with Myf Warhurst
- Series 11 Ep 17: "Van Life (Part 2)" (New South Wales & Western Australia) with Myf Warhurst
- Series 11 Ep 18: "Harvey" with Lisa Millar
- Series 11 Ep 19: "Forrest" with Paul West
- Series 11 Ep 20: "Mataranka" with Kristy O’Brien
- Series 11 Ep 21: "Snowy River" with Lisa Millar
- Series 11 Ep 22: "North East Tasmania"
- Series 11 Ep 23: "Outback Dressmakers" (New South Wales)
- Series 11 Ep 24: "10 Years of Back Roads: Heather’s Farewell" (Victoria)
Locations featured in episodes of Back Roads
