= Eve Langley =

New Zealand/Australian novelist and poet

- Born: 1 September 1904; Forbes, New South Wales
- Died: c. 1 June 1974; Katoomba, New South Wales
- Other names: Ethel Jane Langley; Eve Clark; Oscar Wilde
- Known for: Novelist, poet
- Spouse: Hilary Clark
- Children: Bisi Arilev, Langley Rhaviley and Karl Marx
- Awards: S. H. Prior Memorial Prize (1940)

Eve Langley (1 September 1904 – c. 1 June 1974), born Ethel Jane Langley, was an Australian-New Zealand novelist and poet. Her novels belong to a tradition of Australian women's writing that explores the conflict between being an artist and being a woman.

== Life ==
Langley was born in Forbes, New South Wales, the eldest daughter of carpenter Arthur Alexander Langley (died 1915), and his wife Mira (1868 - 1944), née Davidson, both of whom came from Victoria. Eve's mother was disinherited as the result of her marriage and the family spent much of its life in poverty. After Arthur died, Mira returned to Victoria, initially managing her brother's hotel at Crossover. Eve and her sister June attended several schools in New South Wales and Victoria, including Brunswick Central and Dandenong State Schools, and Dandenong High School.

In the 1920s Eve and her sister worked their way around the countryside of Gippsland as agricultural labourers, which experience forms the base of her first novel The Pea Pickers. In 1932 she followed her mother and sister to New Zealand and in 1937 she married 22-year-old art student Hilary Clark. They had three children: a daughter, Bisi Arilev, and two sons, Langley Rhaviley and Karl Marx. In 1942, her husband had her admitted to Auckland Mental Hospital where she stayed until she was released into her sister's care in 1949. She was divorced in 1952.

Langley worked in Auckland as a book repairer 1950–1955, and then visited Australia 1956–1957, where she travelled extensively through the east coast. She travelled to the United Kingdom in 1959–1960 and then returned to New South Wales in 1960, where she remained for the rest of her life, except for one trip to Greece.

Suzanne Falkiner, writing about women writing about the wilderness, suggests that "Those rare women who have deliberately gone into the landscape alone, and not trailing in the tracks of a protective husband – from Daisy Bates in the 1880s to Eve Langley in the 1930s and Robyn Davidson in the 1970s – have often had to combat being considered eccentric, or even mad".

In her latter years she became extremely reclusive, living in a shack in the Katoomba bush in the Blue Mountains. She became increasingly eccentric, wearing 'mannish clothes' and a white topi and always wore a knife in her belt. Dale Spender writes that much has been written of her eccentricities, such as the wearing of trousers, and says that "it is distressing to find that sometimes there is more comment about her eccentricities as a person than about the strengths of her writing". Langley claimed Oscar Wilde as her alter ego, going so far as to officially take that name by deed poll in 1954. Her work presents many clues to her enigmatic life. The manuscripts of ten of her unpublished novels are held among her papers in the Mitchell Library.

Hal Porter wrote in 1965 about many of the writers he had met, and said that "of them all, Eve Langley is the one with whom, on a first meeting, I spent the most dazzling day, enlivened by the unforeseen".

She spent the last years of her life living alone in the Blue Mountains. She died alone at home sometime between 1 and 13 June, but her body was not found until about 3 weeks after her death.

== Career ==
Langley first made a name for herself as a writer in New Zealand in the 1930s where, with Douglas Stewart, Gloria Rawlinson and Robin Hyde, her poetry was regularly published in magazines. McLeod writes that she was "by the late thirties known in New Zealand literary circles as a promising poet". She continued to be published as a poet after her return to Australia, with her poems appearing in magazines like The Bulletin. One of her poems, "Native-born", regularly appears in Australian anthologies. Her journalism and short stories were also published in the 1930s and 1940s, and occasionally in the 1950s.

While Langley wrote consistently throughout her life, she had only two novels published in her lifetime. Ten other novels are held in the Mitchell Library in manuscript form. She wrote actively during her twenties – journals, letters, poems and stories – and some of these writings were used in her semi-autobiographical novel, The Pea-Pickers, which was published in 1942. The Pea-Pickers has been described as "a fanciful, autobiographical, first-person narrative of the adventures of two young women, 'Steve' and 'Blue' who seek excitement, love and 'poetry' in rural Gippsland". Her second novel, White Topee, is a sequel. Langley often referred to herself as 'Steve' in her journals.

== Literary style and themes ==
In an interview in 1964, Langley described her writing process as "embroidery of literature" and saw herself as "one who chatters and embroiders all the time, endlessly, a great fantasy of romance". McLeod describes her as "a subtle, ironic and complex novelist" and says that her best voice is "sometimes lyrical, sometimes cynical, with a marvellous descriptive flair and an ear for dialogue".

Makowiecka suggests that Langley's novels – published and unpublished – fall into two groups. The first group – The Pea-Pickers, White Topee, Wild Australia, The Victorians and Bancroft House – "reconfigures her life in Gippsland, intermingling this story with those of the bushmen and women of the 1880s, and further embellishing her text with poems, playlets, songs and paeans of praise addressed to ancient gods and mythical lands". The second group – all unpublished – cover her departure for and life in New Zealand. In them she again entwines her stories, but "now with apparently current and factual journal entries tangled in the genre-blurring tapestry of poetry, fantasy and multi-faceted subjectivity".

Makowiecka also states that "time, memory and land are regularly revisited in her writing. She writes of time both in terms of a large historical perspective and the more personal quotidian one". "She explores the processes of memory and that which is remembered, and how this is incorporated into the mind and thence into immortality." "She calls the land "'sacred earth' of western antiquity, and ... of an equally mythic 'Australia'" and writes that she "picked up a new piece of mind from every piece of different landscape I saw". In other words, "as she rides and writes, [she] is creating herself in a self-creating landscape". "In her writing time, memory and the land are entwined in such a way that they affect and are affected by each other."

== Publishing the unpublished ==
Various attempts have been made over the years to publish some of the ten unpublished novels. McLeod describes how she and her colleague, Anita Segerberg, edited, in 1993–4, the unpublished Auckland novels, but says that they were not published due to permission being refused by Langley's daughter, Bisi.

Lucy Frost's Wilde Eve, another editing of the New Zealand novels, was published in 1999. In her introduction to this work, Frost writes "She was Eve Langley and Oscar Wilde, Australian woman and English man – poet caught in the woe of World War II and immortal, one of the ancients come again to life". Despite this, the Wilde obsession plays little part in the book, with Frost, herself, admitting that "the narrator's other is Steve, not Oscar Wilde", Steve being the name she uses for her first person narrator in The Pea-Pickers and other writings.

== Langley portrayed in other media ==
Mark O'Flynn's play titled Eleanor and Eve speculates what might have happened had Australian writers Eve Langley and Eleanor Dark met. While both lived in the Katoomba area at the same time, Dark from 1934 and Langley from the early 1960s to 1974, there is no evidence that they ever met. The play was first performed in 2002 at Varuna, Eleanor Dark's home which is now a writers' centre, with the audience moving between rooms as the play progressed. In 2003, it was performed in a more traditional space at the Railway St. Theatre in Penrith, New South Wales.

Australian-born dancer, now resident in Canada, Elizabeth Langley developed a one-hour multimedia dance-theatre performance about Eve Langley called Journal of Pedal Dreams. It explores Langley's struggles with "the competing demands of motherhood, wifehood and the creative muse". The show has been performed in Australia and Canada in 2003 and 2004. It contains few spoken lines and incorporates projections of Langley's poetry and journal entries. It was based on research undertaken by Elizabeth Langley and Australian Paul Rainsford Towner.

Australian performer Margi Brown Ash portrayed Eve in an award-winning performance entitled "Eve" that had seasons at Metro Arts Theatre in Brisbane and The Blue Room Theatre in Perth in 2012. It will be remounted at the Brisbane Powerhouse in 2017.

== Awards ==
- 1940: S. H. Prior Memorial Prize (run by The Bulletin), for The Pea-Pickers, shared with Kylie Tennant's The Battlers and Malcolm Henry Ellis' John Murtagh Macrossan lectures (?)

== Bibliography ==
- The Pea-Pickers (1942)
- White Topee (1954)
