= Ride on Stranger =

1979 film directed by Carl Schultz

- Based on: Ride on Stranger by Kylie Tennant
- Written by: Peter Yeldham
- Directed by: Carl Schultz
- Starring: Liddy Clark; Michael Aitkens
- Country of origin: Australia
- Original language: English
- No. of episodes: 4

Production
- Producer: Alan Burke
- Running time: 50 mins

Original release
- Network: ABC
- Release: 15 July – 5 August 1979

Ride on Stranger is a 1979 Australian mini series about a woman in the 1930s, based on the novel of the same name by Australian author Kylie Tennant.

== Cast ==
- Liddy Clark as Shannon Jones
- Noni Hazlehurst as Beryl
- Michael Aitkens as John Terry
- Henri Szeps as Vincent Sladde
- Barbara Wyndon as Aunt Edith
- Warwick Sims as Damien Quilter
- Peter Carroll as Mervyn Leggatt
- John Bluthal as Joseph Litchin
- Moya O'Sullivan as Ada Jones
- Ron Graham as Darcey Jones
- Bunney Brooke as Grannie Jones
- Noel Trevarthen as Chaverin Brome
- Debra Lawrence as Jenny
- Ian Gilmour as Freddy
- Lorna Lesley as Olivia Asche
- Walter Pym as Bishop Steele
- Norman Kaye as Inspector
- Don Crosby as George Benson
- Elspeth Ballantyne
