= The Pea-Pickers =

1942 novel by Eve Langley

- First edition
- Author: Eve Langley
- Language: English
- Genre: Semi-autobiographical novel
- Publisher: Angus and Robertson
- Publication date: 1942
- Publication place: Australia
- Media type: Print (Hardback & Paperback)
- Pages: 317 pp
- ISBN: 0-207-19764-4 (2001 edition)
- OCLC: 52161135
- Followed by: White Topee

The Pea-Pickers is a novel by the Australian writer Eve Langley, first published in 1942. It is a first person, semi-autobiographical narrative about two sisters who travel in the 1920s to Gippsland, and other rural areas, to work as agricultural labourers. It shared the 1940 S. H. Prior Memorial Prize (run by The Bulletin) with Kylie Tennant's The Battlers.

The Pea-Pickers received much critical acclaim when it was published, but then interest lapsed and, in the next few decades, it received only "sporadic critical attention". It has been discussed briefly in studies of the Australian novel, but by the early 1980s, only Douglas Stewart had done a lengthy analysis of it. However, in 2001 it was re-released by Angus and Robertson in their Classics series. It has been described as "one of the more extraordinary novels of the first half of the twentieth century in terms of pastoral imagery".

The book was not written until the 1940s but is based on her diary and other writings of the 1920s. It combines both autobiographical and fictional elements, and transposes some characters from her later life. The main character, Steve, appears in several other works of hers. In an interview in 1964, Langley said about writing the book that it was "like a tapestry that I could embroider rapidly".

== Plot summary ==
The novel has a thin plot: two sisters, dressed as men and taking men's names, Steve and Blue, decide to work as agricultural labourers in Gippsland, the place their mother has told them about throughout their childhood and with which they feel they have a "spiritual link". The book chronicles their life and work over a few seasons, and particularly describes "the multitude of eccentrics".

The book is divided into four parts:

- Part One: "For the best! For the best!"

Steve and Blue leave home in Dandenong and travel to Gippsland, near Bairnsdale, where they work as apple-pickers. Steve meets and falls in love with Kelly. They then go to Rutherglen to look for work pruning vines but aren't successful due to their gender, and return home to Dandenong. This title of this section, Maxwell suggests, "reflects the general mood and optimism of the first section".

- Part Two: "The Glitter of Celtic Bronze against the Sea"

Steve and Blue return to Gippsland where they work, mostly, as pea-pickers. Kelly had not responded to Steve's letters, and in this part she falls in love with Macca. Maxwell writes that the title of this section "is from Steve's idealisation of Macca, her lifelong love, whom she sees sometimes as Charon, the mythical Greek boatman on whom the goddess Venus bestowed youth and beauty. The Celtic bronze of his reddish hair is set against the colour of the sea".

- Part Three: "No Moon Yet"

Steve and Blue travel to the Ovens Valley in Northeastern Victoria and obtain work harvesting hops and maize. They spend some of this time out of work, and struggle to feed themselves. They thieve food to survive, most often from the Italian itinerant workers living near them. Steve pines for her love, Macca. The title, Maxwell writes, "expresses Steve's growing impatience and despair as she waits for sings of affection from Macca, her one true love, who has gone up-country".

- Part Four: "Ah, Primavera"

Steve and Blue return to Gippsland for another season of pea-picking. Macca is not there, and Steve learns that he has gone droving and has another "girl". At the end of picking, Blue returns home to marry, at Steve's encouragement, and Steve remains alone in Gippsland.

== Characters ==
- Steve is the first-person narrator of the novel. She sees herself as a poet. The novel focuses primarily on her search for love and "to be loved". "She is moody, passionate and discontented with her life".
- Blue is Steve's sister and "acts as a foil for Steve, and a target for her envy". She is beautiful and is more extroverted than Steve. She is also more pragmatic. The sisters quarrel often, but are devoted to each other.
- Kelly and Macca are the two men Steve falls in love with. Macca, the second love and Steve's main love interest in the novel, is unable to match her intensity.
- Jim is another agricultural worker and their main friend and protector in Part Two. He becomes romantically interested in Blue but she doesn't return his affection.
- The Black Serpent, and her husband the Buccaneer, are Steve's idols. She idealises their marriage and seeks the Black Serpent's support in her quest for Macca's love.
- Mrs Wallaby and Charlie are their main friends in Part Three, and provide them with a home for part of that time. Charlie wants to marry Steve, but she remains focused on her love for Macca.
- Mia is the girls' mother and appears between each part as they return home before setting off on their next adventure. It is her tales of Gippsland which enthuses their adventure in the first place.
- Farm owners and other itinerant workers fill out the rest of novel's "cast". Steve's character, in particular, is developed through her reactions to and interactions with these supporting characters.

== Women dressing as men ==
Eve Langley was not the only Australian writer to create a female character who dresses as a man. It was also done by Joseph Furphy in his Such is Life (1903), Jessie Couvreur, who wrote as Tasma in her short story Monsieur Caloche (1889), Marie Bjelke Petersen in Jewelled Nights (1923) and, after Langley, Kylie Tennant in her The Honey Flow (1956).

== Themes and subject matter ==
The main theme of the book relates to Steve's being "caught between her emotional need for love (and expressing her sexuality), and her intellectual craving for freedom, independence and the life of art as expressed in music and poetry", a freedom, she feels she can best achieve by taking on the name and dress of a man. There is no real resolution to this dilemma at the end of the novel: Blue returns home to marry, while Steve remains in Gippsland, alone.

Several critics comment on the sense of nationalism found in the novel. Suzanne Falkiner says that "writing with a mixture of passionate exuberance and wry self-deprecation, Langley combines realistic detail with an almost Lawrentian prose style, in which the emerging sensuality of the girls is projected onto the landscape and into an almost excessive nationalism". She goes on to say that the novel represents a rare, "vivid" example in Australian literature of "the itinerant labouring life: the bands of Italian and Indian itinerants, the work camps, the attempts to ward off starvation by 'bandicooting' pumpkins and oranges from neighbouring farms".

Joan Maxwell writes in her Teachers Guide that "Many events reflect Steve and Blue's optimism and sense of fun, but there is often a heavy mood of depression and a fear of the destructiveness of the time, which seems to suggest that a feeling of entrapment might have seeped through from 1940".

== Style ==
The narrative structure is chronological, and comprises four parts, each part representing a new "job" for the sisters. In between each of these jobs, the sisters return home to their mother. Critical opinion of the style of the novel varies, largely due to the idiosyncratic nature of Langley's writing. Some see it as "flowery and sometimes overwritten prose ... punctuated with passages of verse with which the narrator, Steve, is obsessed". Others, though, describe her writing as charming, original, ironic and complex. Maxwell, for example, comments that it contains "racy narrative", satiric comments" and moving lyricism".

Arkin suggests that there is an element of the picaresque in the novel and argues this genre suits what she sees as the "transvestism" theme in the novel, as the "picaresque novel is about a rogue or delinquent" who contravenes "moral and civil laws". Maxwell, though, is more literal in her reading of the term and argues that "picaresque" is "not accurate. Steve and Blue are young women in search of adventure, not rogues as the Spanish word picaro would imply".

While describing the book as a "dense and erratic narrative", Ellis argues that "what is striking about this novel is the way the narrative strives for a sense of connection to the land". She sees Langley attempting to achieve this through a "classical understanding", that is, by using "other languages, other cultures and ultimately other histories to voice her sense of connection to the Australian nation". An example she gives of this is Langley's poetic style and her use of a foreign tongue in: "'O Patria Mia! Patria Mia!' and my naked brown feet kissed the dear earth of my Australia and my soul was pure with love of her".

== Critical response ==
Spender comments on the fact that Langley was criticised at the time for having her heroines in The Pea-Pickers and White Topee wear trousers, despite the fact that trousers "permitted freedom of movement" and enhanced personal safety by letting a woman "pass as a man". She says: "but if Eve Langley knew the benefit of trousers, her critics did not: it is distressing to find that sometimes there is more comment about her eccentricities as a person than about the strengths of her writing".

Ellis, on the other hand, writes that "it is almost impossible to side-step the biographical data that often obscures discussion of her work whether it be the eccentricities of her life -- including her transgender wardrobe and her decision to change her name by deed poll to Oscar Wilde -- or her lonely and somewhat grisly death. As a result, commentators of The Pea-Pickers have been fascinated with its presentation of the transvestic, its homoeroticism and its status as (semi)autobiography". Ellis continues to comment that while "the quest on which the sisters embark is not to find their fortunes, their husbands or even themselves, but to find their place in the nation", Langley at no time in the novel gives "serious consideration of the originary sovereignty of the Indigenous people of Australia". She suggests that the "presumption of entitlement that resonates throughout Steve's quest for and within the Australian nation [and] the preponderance of overtly racist passages that often overwhelm the narrative, will inevitably ring discordantly in the ears of modern readers". Falkiner, though, suggests that while her description of the foreign pickers "verges on racism", it is "partly salvaged by good humour".

Australian writer, Hal Porter, writing in 1965, described the novel as "a superb and haunting work".

Not quite a critical response, but in his autobiography Flaws in the Glass, Australian Nobel Laureate Patrick White, writing of his experience of the Second World War says "Otherwise I had dried up. There were stirrings of what I had it in me to write if there were ever a peace, but that didn't seem likely. So I read. I read The Bible, literally from cover to cover. I read The peapickers and was filled with a longing for Australia, a country I saw through a childhood glow".

=== Press opinions ===
The following press opinions are from the dust jacket of the second edition published in 1958:

- Douglas Stewart in The Bulletin: "At once a unique refreshment of our literature that is a remarkable clarification of the Australian Image ... This author is as passionately sardonic as she is, in high moods, ecstatic ... What love of words and skill with words, what love of Australian earth and Australian people and skill in painting them, what rich humour and spiritual power have gone into it."
- Frank Dalby Davison in The Bulletin: "It has the dew on it. It contributes something fresh to Australian literature. It is rare. I think it will be cherished."
- From Brisbane's Telegraph: "It is an astonishing book ... an achievement in the picaresque narrative ... a rich fecundity of descriptive imagination and poetic invention."
- From New York Times Book Review: "The peculiar charm of this book is the Puckish laugh and the rich, earthy figures in which it exults."
- From The Sydney Morning Herald: "Youth is the keynote of this novel. Youth with all its charm and all its faults: warmth and abandon, egotism and garrulousness ... Miss Langley has an excellent sense of humour."
- From Melbourne's Argus: "The descriptive background is too vivid and the character sketching too firm and sure for any other source than real life."
