= The Battlers =

- DVD cover
- Genre: Drama, Romance
- Based on: The Battlers by Kylie Tennant
- Written by: Peter Yeldham
- Directed by: George Ogilvie
- Starring: Gary Sweet; Jacqueline McKenzie
- Theme music composer: Carl Vine
- Country of origin: Australia
- Original language: English
- No. of episodes: 2 x 2 hours

Production
- Producer: Gus Howard
- Cinematography: Roger Dowling
- Editor: Denise Haratzis
- Production company: South Australian Film Corporation
- Budget: $4.1 million

Original release
- Network: Seven Network
- Release: 13 July 1994

The Battlers is a 1994 Australian miniseries about two drifters during the Great Depression, based on the novel of the same name by Kylie Tennant.

== Cast ==
- Gary Sweet as Snow Grimshaw
- Jacqueline McKenzie as Dancy Smith
- Marcus Graham as Busker
- Peter Stonham as Jimmy
- Audine Leith as Dora Chester-Phipps
- Richard Piper as Apostle
- Amanda Cross as Millie
- Anne Phelan as Ma Tyrell
- Lois Ramsey
- Syd Brisbane as Smith

== Synopsis ==
With his horse-drawn carriage and trusty dog in tow, itinerant loner Snow (Gary Sweet) spends months at a time away from home, trawling the backroads of rural Australia looking for work, during the height of the 1930s Great Depression. On his travels, he meets a variety of characters including the ‘busker' (Marcus Graham)’, ‘Ma’ (Anne Phelan) and the ‘stray’, Dancy (Jacqueline McKenzie). Snow and Dancy eventually fall in love, while struggling to make the best of hard times.

== Production details ==
=== Production ===
The series was produced by the South Australian Film Corporation. The screenplay was written by Peter Yeldham and George Ogilvie directed the series.

International sales were handled by Southern Star Primetime.

=== Filming locations ===
The Battlers was filmed on location in the Adelaide Hills in South Australia.

== Release ==
The first episode aired in Australia on 14 July 1994, on Channel 7.

== Awards and nominations ==
| Year | Award | Category | Result | Ref. |
|---|---|---|---|---|
| 1994 | Australian Film Institute Awards | Best Telefeature, Mini Series or Short Run Series | Nominated | |
| 1994 | Australian Film Institute Awards | Best Actress in a Leading Role in a Television Drama | Nominated | |
| 1994 | Screen Music Awards | Best Music for a Miniseries or Telemovie | Won | |
| 1995 | Logie Awards | Most Popular Drama Program | Won | |
