= White Topee =

1954 novel set in Victoria, Australia

- First edition
- Author: Eve Langley
- Language: English
- Genre: Literary fiction
- Publisher: Angus and Robertson
- Publication date: 1954
- Publication place: Australia
- Media type: Print
- Pages: 250 pp
- Preceded by: The Pea-Pickers
- Followed by: –

White Topee (1954) is a novel by Australian writer Eve Langley.

== Plot summary ==
The novel is set in Gippsland, Victoria, which is depicted as an idyllic place with peoples from many nations working on the land in harmony. The novel is a sequel of sorts to the author's earlier book The Pea-Pickers, and features the same characters two years later.

== Critical reception ==
Peter Harding, writing in The Sydney Morning Herald, found the novel "is, more than anything else, a poem. Plain prose and formal verse intersperse many of its 250 pages, but much of it is a poem disguised as prose. The poem is about Australia and Italians, and about a poet's ecstatic, anguished memories of youth in Gippsland and probably somewhere in northern Australia. And in reading it one is in the presence of something great amid a rambling eccentricity."

Peggy Wright was impressed with the novel in The News (Adelaide): "It is impossible to be lukewarm about Eve Langley. Either you lap up her strikingly original prose, or you wonder what the heck she's writing about. Personally, I can take all Eve Langley likes to write, and come back for more...The book is packed with lively characters music-loving Italians, and casual Australians, university graduates and laborers. Every page is rich with a sincere, almost passionate love of Australia."

== See also ==
- 1954 in Australian literature
