= Ride on Stranger (novel) =

1943 novel by Kylie Tennant

- Title page for Ride on Stranger (1979 edition)
- Author: Kylie Tennant
- Language: English
- Publisher: Angus and Robertson
- Publication date: 1943
- Media type: Print
- Pages: 301 pp
- Preceded by: The Battlers
- Followed by: Time Enough Later

Ride on Stranger (1943) is a novel by Australian writer Kylie Tennant.

== Plot summary ==
The novel follows the story of Shannon Hicks, a country girl who arrives in Sydney just before the outbreak of World War II and proceeds to make her way through city life.

== Critical reception ==
The reviewer in The Advertiser found a lot to like but not much plot: "there is much that is genuinely interesting in the book: a great deal of rather malicious humor. unmerciful debunking, racy descriptions of things that are completely and uniquely Australian, and a sincere appreciation of the Australian character."

The reviewer in The Sydney Morning Herald came to a similar conclusion: "In her latest novel. Miss Tennant displays all those qualities which placed her, in 1935, in the front rank of Australian writers of fiction. The reader will meet here an assortment of easily comprehensible and fantastic men and women, equal in colour and variety to those met in "Foveaux" and "The Battlers." The author is slowly but, surely crystallising her extraordinary flair for characterisation. As yet Miss Tennant's sense of form falls short of her exuberant sense of life and movement. Her novel is full of incident—full to the brim with happenings that jostle one another for pride of place. This gives the book a bright, kaleidoscopic atmosphere rather than the more rounded, mature outline of a finished work of art."

== See also ==
- 1943 in Australian literature

== Notes ==
- Epigraph: passage from Discourses of Epictetus, Book I, Chapter II.
- In its essay on the author The Australian Dictionary of Biography notes that the novel was withdrawn from sale in 1943 when a Melbourne Communist read his surname being used by one of the novel's characters and threatened to sue for libel. The publishers settled out of court.

== Television adaptation ==
The novel was adapted for Australian television in 1979. The mini-series was screened over 4 episodes and was directed by Carl Schultz, from a script by Peter Yeldham, and featured Liddy Clark, Noni Hazlehurst, and Henri Szeps.
