= L. C. Rodd =

Australian writer (1905–1979)

L. C. (Lewis Charles) "Roddy" Rodd (1905–1979) was a schoolteacher, writer, activist, and the husband of novelist Kylie Tennant.

== Early life and teaching career ==
Rodd was born on 12 March 1905 in Sydney and gained a Bachelor of Arts from the University of Sydney in 1931. Rodd was a practicing Anglican, and had considered entering the priesthood rather than pursuing education.

In 1931, he was a founder of the Educational Workers' League, and an activist in the New South Wales Teachers' Federation. Rodd contributed regularly to the League's journal, the Education Worker from 1932 to 1936, arguing for changes to the curriculum. Around 1937, he published a pamphlet as part of a "Survey of Australia" series titled Australian Imperialism. He registered as a conscientious objector during World War II.

He met novelist Kylie Tennant at the University of Sydney and they married in 1932. During the 1930s and 1940s, Rodd worked at public schools in Coonabarabran, Canowindra, Dulwich Hill and Mullswellbrook as a teacher, and as headmaster in Laurieton 1941–52 and Hunters Hill Primary School in 1953 and 1954.

After the World War II, Rodd, Tennant and Tennant's father, formed a publishing company, Sirius Books, to re-publish Tennant's novels. It also published "cheap" Australian editions of other novels.

== Retirement and later years ==
Rodd retired from teaching in November 1960, and experiencing depression, attempted suicide shortly after. He collaborated with Donald McLean co-editing a collection of Australian essays Venturing the Unknown Ways (1965) and with Tennant on the collection The Australian Essay (1968). In 1972 he wrote a biography of Father John Hope, long-serving rector of Christ Church St Laurence in George Street, Sydney. He also co-wrote a book about the Church and its location, published the same year.

From 1965 to 1966, Rudd published a series of children's books based on the lives of prominent individuals, almost all authors: Henry Lawson, Louisa M. Alcott, Rudyard Kipling, Mark Twain, Robert Louis Stevenson, R. M. Ballantyne and Henry Parkes. He published an illustrated autobiography A Gentle Shipwreck in 1975.

Rodd died from cancer on 29 July 1979 in the Blue Mountains, aged 74. He was survived by Tennant, and their daughter Benison Rodd, a painter and artist. Their son, John Rodd, died in 1978.

Rodd's papers are held by the National Library of Australia.

== Selected works ==
- John Hope of Christ Church: a Sydney Church era (biography) ISBN 0-85553-072-3
- A Gentle Shipwreck (autobiography) (Sydney, Thomas Nelson, 1975) (illustrated by Cedric Emanuel) ISBN 0-17-005040-8
