= Harold Oswald Fletcher =

Australian palaeontologist

Harold Oswald Fletcher (1903–1996) was a curator and palaeontologist, associated with the Australian Museum from 1918 and retiring as deputy director in 1967. Fletcher was awarded for his contributions to Antarctic research, joining two journeys there as an assistant biologist, and wrote a personal account of the expeditions to that continent led by Mawson (1929–1931).

Harold Fletcher became interested in fossils at an early age, undertook studies in zoology and geology, and worked for the museum in cadetship. His first major field trip was an expedition to Lake Eyre, led by Gerald Harnett Halligan, taking along boats in the expectation of finding islands surrounded by lakes or an inland sea. Fletcher was also engaged in expeditions to Mount Kosciuszko, making collections of invertebrates and plant material in 1929, and made an attempted crossing of the Simpson Desert as second in command to the geologist Cecil Madigan. He was involved in the discovery of a remarkable fossil find at Canowindra, a slab of Devonian rock preserving the remains of one hundred fish. He made many expeditions in sometimes highly adverse conditions, often field trips to obtain fossil specimens, and reported his findings and observations in articles published in the Records and Magazine of his museum.
