= Bruce Burrell =

Australian murderer

Bruce Allan Burrell
- Born: 25 January 1953
- Died: 4 August 2016 (aged 63); Sydney, New South Wales
- Occupation: Advertising executive
- Status: Died in custody
- Convictions: Murder × 2 Kidnapping
- Penalty: Life imprisonment + 44 years

Bruce Allan Burrell (25 January 1953 – 4 August 2016) was an Australian convicted kidnapper and double murderer, who in 2006 was sentenced to a term of life imprisonment plus 44 years for the 1995 murder of 74-year-old Dorothy Davis and the 1997 murder of 39-year-old Kerry Whelan, neither of whom were ever found, with Burrell not revealing the location of his victims' bodies. Burrell died at the Prince of Wales Hospital at Randwick, whilst still in prison custody on 4 August 2016, aged 63, from lung and liver cancer.

== Legal cases ==
=== Murder of Kerry Whelan ===
Kerry Whelan was last seen getting into a Mitsubishi Pajero four-wheel drive with Burrell leaving the Parkroyal Hotel in Parramatta during May 1997, the day after which Whelan's husband Bernie Whelan received a $1 million ransom note. Whelan's body has never been found. The kidnapping and conviction became one of Australia's most infamous crimes.

Burrell, who had been a friend and former employee of the Whelan family, was charged in 1999. Charges were subsequently dropped, but re-instated in 2002 after a formal inquest. The first trial in 2005 ended with a hung jury, but Burrell was convicted on the second trial in 2006. Burrell was sentenced to life imprisonment for murder and 16 years' jail for the kidnapping charge. Burrell was unsuccessful in an appeal against his conviction and sentence to the NSW Court of Criminal Appeal, constituted by the Chief Judge at Common Law, Peter McClellan and Justices Sully and James. The Court of Criminal Appeal discovered it had made factual errors in its judgment and purported to reopen the appeal, and heard from the parties before confirming its orders dismissing the appeal. On 31 July 2008 the High Court held that the Court of Criminal Appeal had no power to reopen the appeal after the orders had been formally recorded and that the error in the judgment on 16 March 2007 meant that those orders must be set aside and the matter remitted to the Court of Criminal Appeal. The Court of Criminal Appeal, Beazley JA, Grove and Howie JJ dismissed the appeals.

=== Murder of Dorothy Davis ===
Dorothy Davis was a 74-year-old wealthy widow living in Lurline Bay, Sydney. On 30 May 1995, Davis left her apartment to visit Burrell's wife. She was never seen again. Burrell was charged with Davis's murder and later found guilty by a jury, stating financial gain as a motive. Burrell was sentenced to 28 years in prison with a non-parole period of 21 years. Burrell's appeal against his conviction and sentence was dismissed in 2009. Burrell sought special leave to appeal to the High Court, but this was refused.

== Media ==
In March 2022, author Mark Tedeschi released a book, Missing, Presumed Dead, on the murders.

In April 2022, True Crime Conversations, an Australian crime podcast, interviewed Tedeschi about his book and the details of the murders.
