= Melicent Jane (Jean) Ellis =

Australian co-founder of the Penguin Club (1887–1974)

Jean Ellis
- Born: Melicent Jane Ayscough; 23 March 1887; Brisbane
- Died: 6 July 1974 (aged 87); Rose Bay, New South Wales
- Occupation: Club President
- Known for: creating a nationwide club to improve public speaking for women
- Spouse: Malcolm Henry Ellis (m. 1914)
- Children: a daughter

Melicent Jane Ellis OBE (March 23, 1887 – July 6, 1974), born Melicent Jane Ayscough and known as M. Jean Ellis, was the Australian co-founder of the Penguin Club, which encouraged women to speak publicly with confidence. It was her leadership that saw the organisation spread to every state in Australia. The not-for-profit organisation is now known as "Speaking Made Easy".

== Life ==
Ellis was born in Brisbane in 1887. She married the historian and writer Malcolm Henry Ellis in 1914 in the Anglican St Luke's Church in Brisbane. Ellis had intended to be a nurse and she had saved up fifty pounds to pay for her training. This did not happen and their daughter was born in 1915. Ellis later attended lectures at the University of Sydney.

Ellis was an excellent public speaker and in 1937 she and a less confident friend founded the Penguin Club of Australia which taught women to have confidence when speaking in public. She initially took the role of secretary, but after a year she took the role of President. She had a divorce in 1939 and then lived with her daughter.

The Penguin Club was still young when the country was at war, but Ellis still managed to visit different branches in different states. During the war she was organising the construction of camourflage nets using twine. That organisation was called the Central Netting Depot and it initially used the large space of a ballroom to arrange the sisal into nets. By 1945 her organisation had manufactured thousands of these nets for the military at fifty different locations. In the same year, she became the (autocratic) Federal president of the Penguin Club of Australia. This was an unpaid position and "Mother Penguin" did not allow anyone to change the rules.

In 1956 there were over 40 branches with over a thousand members when the first Penguin Club in the capital territory was formed. Ellis was at the initial meeting of 60 women who decided to create Canberra's branch. At the meeting were members of Rostrum which was a similar (and older) group that assisted men who wanted to speak better in public. The Penguin Club's meetings followed a syllabus. The speaking would last for an hour and then someone (e.g.a Rostrum member) would offer twenty minutes of advice.

Each state in Australia had its own council who were elected twice each year. Each state would send two delegates to the Penguin Club's Federal Council. A notable members of the club was the prime minister's wife, Margaret Whitlam.

In 1963 Queen Elizabeth II was in Sydney and Ellis was awarded an OBE.

== Death and legacy ==
She died in 1974 in Sydney. On the centenary of her birth and fifty years after the Penguin Club was formed, Untamed by Time was published which includes accounts of her by her admirers.

The organisation she created was renamed "Speaking Made Easy" and it encourages membership irrespective of gender.
