= All the Proud Tribesmen =

Book by Kylie Tennant

- Author: Kylie Tennant
- Language: English
- Genre: Children's fiction
- Publisher: Macmillan
- Publication date: 1959
- Publication place: Australia
- Media type: Print
- Pages: 159pp
- Preceded by: The Honey Flow
- Followed by: Trail Blazers of the Air

All the Proud Tribesmen (1959) is a children's novel by Australian author Kylie Tennant, illustrated by Clem Seale. The book won the Children's Book of the Year Award: Older Readers in 1960.

== Book summary ==
The book tells the story of a 12-year-old boy from an imaginary island in the Torres Strait and of a volcanic disaster that drives the local fishing and pearl-diving population to migrate to a neighbouring island.

== Critical reception ==
E.B. in The Canberra Times was brief: "Written for children Miss Tennant's new work of fiction is an intelligent story of the missionary stage of the changing pattern of social living for the island people of our near north."

As was the reviewer in Kirkus Reviews: "Kylie Tennant tells a good story and enriches it with a vivid picture of the islands and the men who inhabit them."

== See also ==
- 1959 in Australian literature
- 1960 in Australian literature
