= S. H. Prior Memorial Prize =

Australian fiction award

The S.H. Prior Memorial Prize was an Australian literary award for a work of fiction. It was established in 1934 by H. K. Prior in recognition of his late father, Samuel Henry Prior, who was editor of The Bulletin. It was open to Australian residents or persons born in Australia, New Zealand or the South Pacific islands.

Award winners:

- 1935: Kylie Tennant – Tiburon
- 1936: Miles Franklin – All That Swagger
- 1937-1938: Not awarded
- 1939: Miles Franklin and Kate Baker – Who Was Joseph Furphy?
- 1940: Eve Langley – The Pea Pickers; M. H. Ellis – Lachlan Macquarie; Kylie Tennant – The Battlers
- 1941: Not awarded
- 1942: Gavin S. Casey – It's Harder for Girls
- 1943-1944: Not awarded
- 1945: Douglas Stewart – The Fire on the Snow
- 1946: Brian James – Cookabundy Bridge
