= Eugene Falleni =

Italian-Australian murderer (1875–1938)

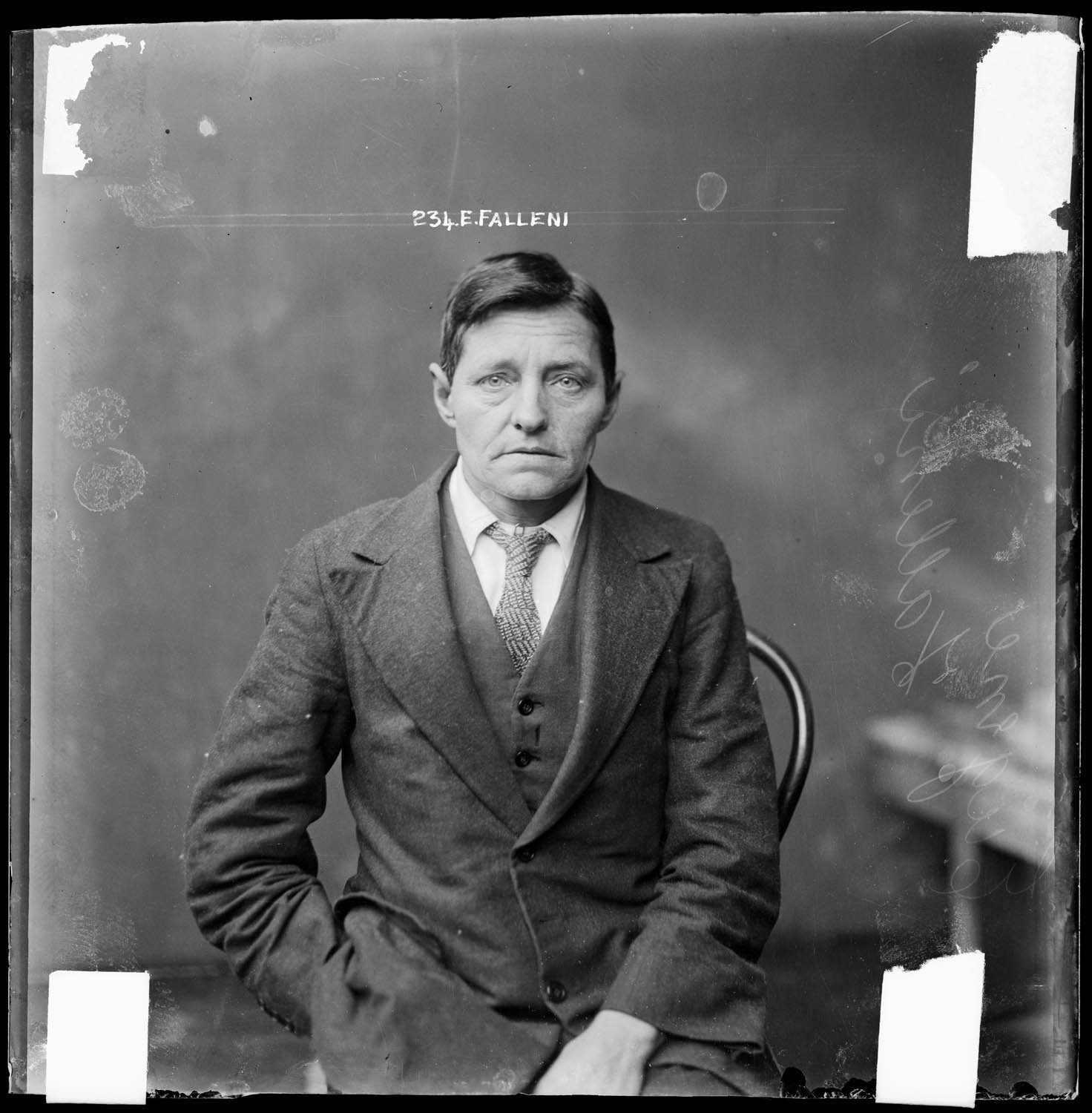
- Falleni in 1920, taken by the NSW Police Department, likely on the day of arrest.
- Born: 25 July 1875 near either Livorno (according to family accounts) or Florence, Italy
- Died: 10 June 1938 (aged 62); Sydney Hospital, Sydney, Australia
- Other names: Harry Leo Crawford; Jean Ford
- Occupations: Manual labourer; Boarding house proprietor
- Known for: Transgender man; Conviction of the murder of his first wife, Annie Birkett
- Spouses: Annie Birkett (m. 1913; died 1917); Elizabeth King Allison (m. 1919)
- Children: Josephine Crawford Falleni
- Status: Deceased
- Conviction: Murder
- Penalty: Death; commuted to life imprisonment

Details
- Victims: Annie Birkett
- Date: 1 October 1917
- Locations: near Mowbray Road, Chatswood
- Date apprehended: 5 July 1920
- Imprisoned at: Long Bay Gaol (1920–1931)

Eugene Falleni (25 July 1875 – 10 June 1938) (also known as Harry Leo Crawford and Jean Ford) was an Italian-Australian transgender man convicted of the 1917 murder of his first wife.

== Early life ==
Falleni was born in Italy, near either Livorno (according to family accounts) or Florence. Assigned female at birth, Falleni was the eldest of 22 children, of whom seventeen survived childhood. He migrated with his parents to Wellington, New Zealand c. 1877, at age 2. His father, a stern disciplinarian, worked as a carrier with a horse and cart and as a fisherman, among other occupations. After repeatedly dressing in male attire to obtain work in brickyards and stables during his teenage years, Falleni married in September 1894, but soon learnt that his husband was already married, and in 1895, Falleni left New Zealand and began working on a ship, possibly as a cabin boy. His family made little effort to find him after years of being opposed to his behaviour.

According to a speculative account, Falleni later recounted that after less than two years at sea, he inadvertently disclosed during a drunken conversation with the ship's captain, a man named Martello, that he had been raised as female: speaking in Italian, Falleni stated that his grandmother referred to him as a piccolina (the feminine form of the noun for 'little one'). Although there is no proven evidence for this, Falleni was also ostracised by the rest of the crew and repeatedly raped by the captain. Falleni was put ashore pregnant and destitute in 1898, at the ship's next port of call in Newcastle, New South Wales.

In Sydney, Falleni gave birth to a daughter, Josephine Crawford Falleni, and put the child into the care of an Italian-born woman, Mrs. de Angelis, in Double Bay. He took on the male identity of Harry Leo Crawford, of supposed Scots descent, visiting his daughter only infrequently. Josephine Falleni called de Angelis 'Granny', who told her that her father was a sea captain.

== Relationship with Annie Birkett ==
In 1912, after a series of manual jobs in abattoirs, pubs, and in a rubber factory, Falleni entered the employ of a Dr. G. R. C. Clarke in Wahroonga, Northern Sydney, as a general useful and sulky driver. It was there that he met Clarke's housekeeper Annie Birkett, who had been widowed several years before, with a son named Harry Birkett. Birkett and her son left for Balmain, where she used some money she had to set up a confectionery shop. Falleni followed her there and took an interest in the business. On 19 February 1913, Falleni and Birkett were married at the Methodist parsonage in inner city Balmain. Soon after, the couple moved to Drummoyne, where Falleni worked in hotels and factories at various kinds of work.

=== Birkett's death ===
According to Falleni and witnesses at his later trial, Birkett was not aware that he was transgender until 1917, when a neighbour told her. Falleni refused to confirm this to Birkett when she confronted him, fearing that she would tell the police and have him arrested. On 1 October 1917, Birkett suggested that the two of them have a picnic near Lane Cove River. According to Falleni's later statement to the police, the two of them quarrelled after she revealed her intention to leave him. Falleni reported that during the argument she slipped and fell backward, hitting her head on a rock. He said that he tried to save her but she died within minutes, and in a panic that he would be investigated and exposed as transgender, he attempted to burn the body beyond identification. Falleni told Birkett's son that she had run off with another man, while a witness at the later trial also claimed Falleni had told them Birkett had 'cleared out'.

Birkett's body was discovered in scrub land off Mowbray Road, Chatswood. The medical examiner reported "no definite marks of violence" and concluded she had died "probably due to burns". The body was not identified at that time, and newspaper accounts reported that the police believed it to be a case of suicide, based on accounts of a woman 'whose manner has been regarded as strange' being recently seen in the area, and the discovery of a small bottle of kerosene. Ultimately, an open verdict was returned at the inquest and the remains were buried in a coffin marked 'the body of an unknown woman' at Rookwood Cemetery.

In 1919, Falleni met Elizabeth King Allison, known as Lizzie, who was over fifty years of age. They married at Canterbury in September 1919, with Falleni giving his name as Harry Leo Crawford, his place of birth as Scotland, and his occupation as mechanical engineer.

== Arrest ==
After Birkett's disappearance, her son took up lodgings at Woolloomooloo. In 1920, he visited his aunt and reported that upon returning from a holiday weekend and discovering that his mother was missing, Falleni took him to The Gap, a notorious suicide spot, where he threw stones off the cliff and tried to entice the boy closer to the edge. At night, about a week later, Falleni took him to scrub land near Manning Road, Double Bay, and asked him to dig a hole. He did, but an emotional Falleni then threw the shovel into the bushes and they returned to the city. These actions made Harry Birkett suspicious of his father, as did his recollection of his illiterate father asking him to read an article about the shoes of the unknown burns victim.

Harry Birkett went to the police, and was able to identify the victim's personal effects as his mother's, in particular, her shoes which Falleni had personally repaired. Falleni was arrested at his workplace on 5 July 1920. Falleni asked to be placed in the women's cells. He had been living with Allison in a house in Stanmore, but requested that his wife not be told that he was transgender. His lawyer, Maddocks Cohen, did not apply for bail. Birkett's remains were exhumed, but a second post-mortem, including x-rays, did not reveal any new information and her body was released to her family for burial at Woronora. Falleni's daughter was located and interviewed by the police.

== Trial, later life, and death ==
At the committal hearing in August 1920, witnesses included the dentist who made the false teeth found with Birkett's remains and Birkett's sister, Lillie Nugent, who also identified the gemstone found with the body as belonging to the deceased. Birkett's son testified that his mother had only married Falleni because he was so persistent and after that 'there were always rows and they were never happy'. He mentioned them leaving for his aunt's, then another location, and how much Falleni 'worried' his mother and an incident when Falleni found them and 'smashed up everything'. He expanded on his story of his trip with Falleni to The Gap and testified that Falleni had tried to lure him over the fence to the cliff edge. Falleni's lawyer, Maddocks Cohen, objected to his evidence about being taken to dig holes in the scrub, but the magistrate allowed it on the grounds that it indicated Falleni's frame of mind.

The Government Medical Officer, Dr Palmer, repeated his testimony from the post-mortem that he believed the deceased died of burns and was alive when the fire began, due to blistering on the skin, but he could not say if she was conscious or not. He also stated that small cracks to the skull were likely a result of the fire, but a more substantial one could have been evidence of violence. Henrietta Schieblich, who rented Falleni a room after Birkett's death, said Falleni had told her his wife had left him and added, 'We had a jolly good row, and I gave her a crack on the head, and she cleared'. She also claimed Falleni had said he was going to kill Birkett's son on the night he took him to dig holes in the scrub. Another witness supported the son's evidence that Falleni, who couldn't read or write, had asked others to look for mentions of a murder in the newspapers in the weeks after Birkett's disappearance.

The prosecutor was given permission to treat Falleni's daughter Josephine as a hostile witness and submitted her earlier sworn statement to police as evidence:

"I first remember my mother when about seven years of age. She always wore men's clothing, and was known as Harry Crawford. I was brought up at Double Bay by Mrs. de Angelis, whom I used to call 'Granny.' Granny told me that Harry Crawford was my mother, and that my father was the captain of a boat. My mother was very cruel to me when I was a child, and often forgot me. Granny told me that my mother tried to smother me when I was a baby. Mrs. de Angelis died when I was about 12 years of age, and my mother took me to a little confectionery shop in Balmain, kept by a Mrs. Birkett, who had a son named Harry. My mother told me Mrs. Birkett had some money, and always thought my mother was a man. I said to my mother, 'She'll find you out one of these days.' My mother replied, 'Oh, I'll watch it. I would rather do away with myself than let the police find anything about me.' My mother told me always to call her father, and not let Mrs. Birkett nor anyone else know that she was a woman. I did not know that my mother was married to Mrs. Birkett, but they occupied the same bed-room. They quarrelled a great deal, and mother used to come out and say, 'More rows over you. I cannot get any sleep.' I replied to my mother, and she said, 'Oh, a lovely daughter I've got.' I said, 'What can you expect? A lovely mother I've got.' In 1917 I met my mother, who told me everything was unsettled and upside down, as Mrs. Birkett had discovered she was a woman. My mother seemed very agitated, and was always reticent about herself."

At the end of the hearing, Falleni was committed for trial and refused bail. A few days after the committal hearing, the magistrate, Mr. Gale, was criticised in a Sydney newspaper for personally escorting into the courtroom, and providing 'box seats' for, a popular actor and actress.

At Falleni's trial for murder at Darlinghurst courthouse in October 1920, the ‘Man-Woman case’ created a press sensation, with the accused appearing in the dock first in a man's suit and then in women's clothes. The Crown's case followed the evidence presented at the committal, although the prosecutor was reticent when 'referring to the relations between the accused and the deceased' because 'there were some matters to which he did not care to refer to in the presence of women'. He was rebuked by the presiding Chief Justice, Sir William Cullen, who responded that 'if women came to a criminal court they must not be considered for a moment'. The prosecutor presented a dildo found in a search of Falleni and Lizzie's home in Stanmore, as evidence that he was 'practical in deceipt' about his gender.

Evidence from other witnesses did not always support the Crown's case. While on his way to work, David Lowe saw a woman with a suitcase behaving in a 'half-witted' way, who disappeared into the scrub 200 yards from where the burned remains were found. Police-Inspector Mayes was one of those, at the original inquest, who suggested the body may have been of a woman who set herself on fire accidentally.

Falleni pleaded not guilty to the murder, but the jury only took two hours to reach their verdict, and he was convicted and condemned to death. Asked by Cullen if he had anything to say, Falleni consulted with his attorney before replying: " 'I have been three months in Long Bay Gaol. I am near to a nervous breakdown. I am not guilty, your Honor. I know nothing whatsoever of this charge. It is only through false evidence that I have been convicted."

In mid-October, Falleni lodged an appeal against the conviction, the basis of which was:

"...that the jury's verdict was against evidence, that the evidence tendered by the Crown was weak and merely circumstantial; that the case against the accused set up by the Crown was destroyed by the evidence of the Crown's medical witnesses; that the identification of the appellant with some person alleged by the Crown to have been seen in the neighbourhood of the place where a charred body was found was unsatisfactory, and that owing to nervous prostration at the trial, the appellant was physically unable to make a statement of facts, which would have answered the circumstantial evidence..."

The Court of Criminal Appeal dismissed the case finding that if the original jury 'came to the conclusion that the accused was the person who had brought about the death of the woman, no matter by what means, it was justified in finding a verdict of guilty'. Falleni's sentence was commuted to imprisonment for life but the matter of his gender identity and the supposed deception of it was made much of in the popular press, which portrayed him as a monster and a pervert.

Friends of Falleni and 'prison reform workers' petitioned 'on several occasions' for his release. In February 1931, reportedly following an hour-long visit with the prisoner, Minister for Justice Joe Lamaro granted Falleni his freedom on the basis that he was nearly sixty years old and 'not of robust health'. Upon leaving Long Bay, Falleni was taken by car 'for an unknown destination'. Questions were again raised by the press about the case, as there was no certainty as to the body being Birkett's, the skull fractures and the effect of the fire, the possibility of poison and the lack of 'definite evidence that Falleni had taken the woman's life'.

In April 1935, when Inspector Stuart Robson gave a speech upon taking on the role of officer in charge of the Broken Hill Police District, in which he recalled his involvement with the Falleni case:

"I was also responsible for the arrest of Eugenia Falleni, the famous man-woman. She was the child of an Italian skipper and he dressed her in male clothes and she worked as a cabin boy. She kept to male attire, and her exploits are well known. She was convicted for the murder of her 'wife', and was sentenced to life imprisonment. I arrested her when she was working as a man, breaking down rum in a Sydney hotel cellar. That was three years after the murder. I thought I had arrested a man, and it was not until she declined to undress that I thought there was something wrong. A doctor made the discovery. She was subsequently released and has completely disappeared."

Falleni had assumed the name "Mrs. Jean Ford" and became the proprietor of a boarding house in Paddington, Sydney. On 9 June 1938, he was struck by a motorcar in nearby Oxford Street, and died of his injuries the following day in Sydney Hospital. He was only identified through fingerprint records and the £100 he gained from the sale of the boarding house business, just before the accident, found in his bag. The inquest returned a verdict of accidental death. Falleni's funeral notice was announced under his final name and he was buried in the Church of England section of Rookwood Cemetery.

== Legacy ==
In the intervening years, after the publication by the press and popular crime writers of a large amount of speculation and various contradictory accounts of his life (many of them propagated by Falleni himself, who had grown up believing that impersonating a man was a criminal offence), the case was largely forgotten until the appearance of a detailed biography of Falleni, titled Eugenia: A Man, was written by Suzanne Falkiner in 1988, after which his story was taken up in Australia by a number of artists, playwrights and short film makers, museum and photography curators, and academics with an interest in gender studies.

A play based on the life of Falleni by New Zealand playwright Lorae Parry premiered in the US at the State University of New York at New Paltz on 1 March 2012. Also in 2012, Mark Tedeschi QC wrote a conjectural or partly fictionalised biography of Falleni, entitled Eugenia Falleni (Simon & Schuster). A new edition of Falkiner's book, summarising new information, was published in 2014. The case was also detailed in a 2016 episode of Felon True Crime Podcast.
