= Anna Daniels =

Australian radio/TV presenter

- Occupations: Author, comedian, radio producer, television presenter, actress

Anna Daniels is an Australian author, comedian, radio producer, television presenter and actress. She is arguably most notable for a botched radio interview with Academy Award-winning actor Russell Crowe, and for her current voice acting role in Bluey, where she voices the recurring character Janelle.

== Early life ==
One of five children in her family, Daniels grew up in the Queensland city of Rockhampton.

Daniels attended a local Catholic school, The Cathedral College, where she was school captain. She graduated in 1998. Since her graduation, Daniels has returned as a special guest on a number of occasions including as Guest of Honour at the school's "Scholar's Assembly" in 2011; to deliver a speech at the school's Academic Awards ceremony in 2015; and to launch her debut novel, Girl in Between in 2017.

After graduating from The Cathedral College, Daniels attended the Queensland University of Technology in Brisbane, where she graduated with a journalism degree majoring in creative writing in 2002.

== Career ==
=== Radio ===
Following her graduation from QUT, Daniels completed a six-month internship at ABC Radio Brisbane before returning to Rockhampton to commence work as a producer for ABC Capricornia for two years after which Daniels temporarily relocated to London for a brief period where she worked in a book store.

Returning to Australia in 2006, Daniels recommenced working for the ABC in Darwin as a field reporter for ABC Radio Darwin. It was during her time in the Northern Territory, Daniels began a collaborative partnership with comedian Anne Edmonds. The duo were eventually commissioned by the ABC to create an online sketch comedic series Tough at the Top which spawned their most successful sketch, Raylene the Racist.

Daniels moved to Melbourne in 2009, where she began work at ABC Radio Melbourne, producing the breakfast program, hosted by Red Symons.

==== Russell Crowe interview ====
When Daniels was working as a producer for ABC Capricornia in 2003, she recorded a now infamous 40-minute interview with actor Russell Crowe which took place during a chance meeting between Daniels and Crowe in the small Central Queensland town of Capella where Crowe was touring with his band, 30 Odd Foot of Grunts.

Daniels botched the interview so badly, she ultimately decided to edit it and have it broadcast as a comedic look at how not to conduct an interview. The comedy piece, entitled How Not To Interview Russell Crowe, went on to win the ABC's Comedy Segment of the Year at the annual ABC Local Radio Awards, held in Melbourne in 2004.

=== Television ===
Daniels has worked on various television programs including The Project on Network Ten, Queensland Weekender on the Seven Network and Landline on ABC Television. She currently voices recurring character Janelle, the mother of secondary character Lucky and his younger brother Chucky, in the animated series Bluey.

Daniels' most notable television work has been with The Project where she was initially employed as an associate producer before being elevated to producer. Daniels has regularly appeared as an on-screen reporter since she filmed a 'feel good' story about Rockhampton prior to the 2010-2011 Queensland floods which affected the city in early 2011. After executives at The 7pm Project saw the piece, they allowed to be aired on the program which led to Daniels covering other stories for the program as a "roving reporter".

=== Writing ===
In 2017, Daniels launched her debut novel, titled Girl in Between, which was published by Allen & Unwin.

The romantic comedy originated from a manuscript she wrote called Rocky Road which was short-listed for The Australian/Vogel Literary Award in 2016, but was beaten by Katherine Brabon's The Memory Artist.

== Filmography ==
=== Television ===
Year	Title	Role
2021–present	Bluey	Janelle
