= Suzanne Falkiner =

Australian writer (born 1952)

- Born: 1952 (age 73–74); Sydney, New South Wales, Australia
- Education: University of New South Wales; Columbia University; University of Technology, Sydney
- Occupation: Writer
- Website: suzannefalkiner.com

Suzanne Falkiner (born 1952) is an Australian writer.

== Biography ==
Born in Sydney, Australia, Falkiner grew up in western New South Wales. She graduated with a Bachelor of Arts degree from the University of New South Wales and later completed postgraduate courses in fiction, non-fiction and editing at Columbia University. In 2005 she was awarded a Doctorate of Creative Arts by the University of Technology Sydney. After travelling extensively and working in various publishing and editing positions, she currently lives in Sydney and works as a full-time writer.

== Bibliography ==
=== Fiction ===
- Rain in the Distance (1986) novel
- After the Great Novelist (1989) travel stories

=== Non-fiction ===
- Australian Aborigines: Shadows in a Landscape 1979 (with photographs by Laurence Le Guay): an essay on Aboriginal Australia
- Australians Today 1985 (with photographs by Lorrie Graham): a portrait of multicultural Australia
- Eugenia: A Man (1988) biography: the story of Eugenia Falleni, and the 'Man-Woman Case', about a transsexual accused of murder in 1920s Sydney. New edition with revisions and update chapter published by Xoum, Sydney, in 2014.
- The Writer's Landscape: Wilderness and Settlement (1992) an essay in two volumes on the role of landscape in defining Australian literature. Deals with the writings of early settlers, explorers and social commentators through to later writers and poets including Henry Lawson, Eve Langley, Douglas Stewart, Thea Astley, Patrick White, Randolph Stow, Elizabeth Jolley, Robyn Davidson
- Ethel: A Love Story (1996) biography: a portrait of early 20th-century Australian society
- Lizard Island: The Journey of Mary Watson (2001) biography, accompanied by a monograph on the artist Alan Oldfield and his narrative series of paintings 'The story of Mrs Watson 1881': explores the death of Mary Watson, her Chinese servant and her four-month-old baby son after their escape from Lizard Island in Far North Queensland, and the previously-unrecorded massacre of Aborigines that followed
- Joan in India (2008) biography: the story of Joan Falkiner, an Australian woman who married the Muslim ruler H.H. Taley Muhammed Khan, the Nawab of Palanpur, in 1939, and lived with him in Gujarat throughout the period leading to Indian Independence
- The Imago: E. L. Grant Watson & Australia (2011) biography, describes the Australian journeys of English biologist and writer Elliot Lovegood Grant Watson, and his subsequent works
- Mrs Mort's Madness (2014), the true story of a Sydney scandal from 1920, involving the murder of Claude Tozer by his lover Dorothy Mort. Mort was found not guilty on the ground of insanity.
- Mick: A Life of Randolph Stow, (2016) biography
- Rose The story of Rose de Freycinet, the first woman to circumnavigate the world and leave a written account of her journey, (2022) history, biography

=== As editor ===
- Room to Move: The Redress Press Book of Australian Short Stories (1985; United States, 1986)

== Awards and nominations ==
- 1980: Runner up in the Australian Vogel award
- 1981: Runner up in the Australian Vogel award for Rain in the Distance
- 1996: Shortlisted for the Nita B. Kibble Award in 1996 for Ethel: A Love Story
- 2001: Shortlisted (with Alan Oldfield) for the Queensland Premier's Literary Awards (History) for Lizard Island: The Journey of Mary Watson
- 2002: Shortlisted (with Alan Oldfield) for the NSW Premier's History Awards for Lizard Island: The Journey of Mary Watson
- 2017: Shortlisted for the National Biography Award for Mick: A life of Randolph Stow
- 2017: Shortlisted for the Prime Minister's Literary Award for Non-fiction for Mick: A life of Randolph Stow'
