= Josh Arnold (musician) =

Australian country singer

- Born: 1976 (age 49–50); Australia
- Genres: Country
- Occupations: Musician, songwriter, teacher's aide
- Instruments: Vocals, guitar
- Years active: 2001–present
- Member of: The Woolshed Band

Josh Arnold (born 1976) is a Golden Guitar-winning Australian country musician.

Arnold is known for his solo career which saw him release the albums Galvanize (2001), Scarifier (2003) and Fire in the Sun (2005).

At the 2002 Country Music Awards of Australia, Arnold and Lee Kernaghan won a Golden Guitar for their version of "Thank God I'm a Country Boy", a single from Galvanize.

In 2020, Arnold formed a new group called Josh Arnold & The Woolshed Band. Their debut EP entitled Raddle & Rise generated the single "The Woolshed".

While working as a teacher's aide in Toowoomba in 2010, Arnold launched a project called Small Town Culture with the University of Southern Queensland. Arnold has since visited hundreds of rural and remote towns throughout regional Queensland to collaborate with local schools, community groups and organisations to create original songs and music videos.
