= Malcolm Henry Ellis =

Australian journalist and biographer

Malcolm Henry Ellis, CMG (21 August 1890 – 18 January 1969) was an Australian journalist, historian and critic. He usually wrote as M. H. Ellis. His wife, Jean Ellis, founded the Penguin Club of Australia in 1937. His younger brother Ulrich Ellis was also a journalist and historian.

== Life ==
Ellis won praise during World War II for his column, "The Service Man", which appeared under the pseudonym "Ek Dum". Using radio reports and his knowledge of terrain, he described military campaigns in a realistic manner so that it was assumed he was present.

In the 1930s and '40s he wrote a series of anti-communist tracts (The Red Road (1932), Socialisation in Ten Years (1947) and The Garden Path (1949)) which warned of the growing influence of communism in the Australian labour movement, and of the nationalisation of banks.

Ellis regarded Manning Clark as a Communist "fellow traveller," and his criticism was so severe that he almost subverted the launching of the Australian Dictionary of Biography. In his review of the first volume of Clark's A History of Australia in the Sydney Bulletin, his excoriating review declared that it was "History without facts." It is, for many, the main legacy of his extensive works, which include biographies of key early Australian colonial figures, Francis Greenway, John Macarthur and Lachlan Macquarie.

== Private life ==
Ellis married Melicent Jane (Jean) Ellis in 1914. She had intended to be a nurse. Their first child was born in 1915. His wife was an excellent public speaker and in 1937 she and a friend founded the Penguin Club of Australia which taught women to have confidence when speaking in public. They divorced in 1939. In 1946 he married Gwendoline Mary Wheeler in Sydney.

== Awards ==
- 1942: awarded the S. H. Prior prize by The Bulletin for his John Murtagh Macrossan lectures at the University of Queensland on Macquarie
- 1956: appointed Companion of the Order of St Michael and St George (C.M.G.)
- 21 October 1966: honorary doctorate conferred by the University of Newcastle. The vice-chancellor, Professor James Auchmuty, praised him for contributing more than any other historian to 'knowledge of our country in the first half century of its existence'

== Books ==
- A Handbook for Nationalists (1918)
- The Long Lead (1927)
- Express to Hindustan (1929)
- The Red Road: The Story of the Capture of the Lang Party by Communists, Instructed from Moscow (1932)
- The Beef Shorthorn in Australia (1932)
- The Defence of Australia (1933)
- Socialisation in Ten Years (1947)
- Lachlan Macquarie: His Life, Adventures and Times (1947)
- Francis Greenway: His Life and Times (1949)
- The Garden Path: The Story of the Saturation of the Australian Labour Movement by Communism (1949)
- John Macarthur (1955)
- The Torch: A Picture of Legacy (1957)
- Metal Manufacturers Limited: A Golden Jubilee History, 1916-1966 (1966)
- A Saga of Coal: The Newcastle Wallsend Coal Company's Centenary Volume (1969)
