= The Battlers (novel) =

Book by Kylie Tennant

- First edition
- Author: Kylie Tennant
- Language: English
- Publisher: Victor Gollancz Ltd, UK
- Publication date: 1941
- Publication place: Australia
- Media type: Print – hardback and paperback
- Pages: 317
- Preceded by: Foveaux
- Followed by: Time Enough Later

The Battlers (1941) is a novel by Australian author Kylie Tennant. It won the ALS Gold Medal in 1942.

== Plot summary ==
The novel follows the journeys of a group of Australian men and women roaming the countryside looking for work during the Great Depression of the 1930s.

== Notes ==
- Epigraph: To the "Battlers"/I wonder where they are now?/They will never read this, never know it is written./Somewhere a dirty crew of vagabonds,/Blasphemous, generous, cunning and friendly,/Travels the track; and wherever it takes them,/Part of me follows".

== Reviews ==
Reviewer "R.K." in The Age, in an overview of the author's novels, stated: "she tells the story of several extraordinary characters who are ordinary enough 'on the tramp.' Here is the 'busker,' 'Snowy,' 'the 'postle' and — perhaps herself — 'the stray,' such a gathering as would provoke the pen of Priestley. There is something akin to the great English writer in the outlook of this young Australian. She lacks his boisterous, overflowing virility, his power to thrill with the common touch, but she has his appreciation of the ordinary man, his yearning for simplicity and hatred of cant. "

The News of Adelaide named the novel their book of the week with the reviewer finding: "Here is a good Australian story. Miss Tennant has fine humor, not slapstick variety, but with a subtle freshness and sparkle that few writers possess. It is not Wodehouse; it is not that Oxonian Anthony Armstrong; it is not anybody of whom I can think just now. It is Kylie Tennant, with a personality all her own, who entertains. amuses, and instructs."

== Adaptations ==
- The novel was adapted for Australian television in 1994, with the mini-series being directed by George Ogilvie from a script by Peter Yeldham.

== Awards and nominations ==
- 1942 winner ALS Gold Medal
