= Kylie Tennant =

Australian novelist and playwright

Kylie Tennant AO
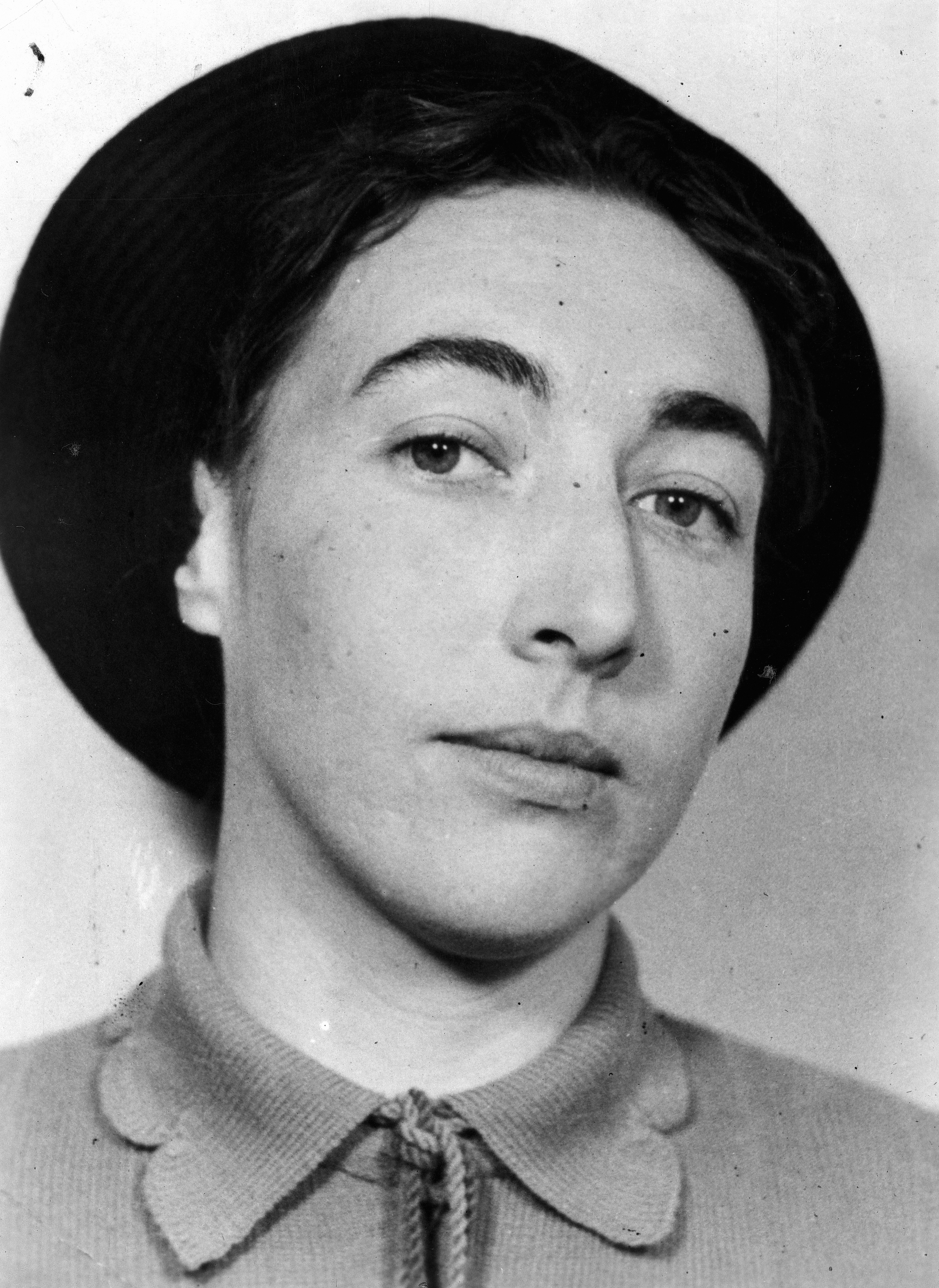
- Tennant in c.1945
- Born: Kathleen Kylie Tennant; 12 March 1912; Manly, New South Wales, Australia
- Died: 28 February 1988 (aged 75); Sydney, New South Wales, Australia
- Spouse: L. C. Rodd (m. 1933)
- Children: 2
- Writing career
- Years active: 1931–1988
- Notable works: The Battlers, All the Proud Tribesmen
- Notable awards: ALS Gold Medal 1942, Children's Book of the Year Award: Older Readers 1960

Kathleen Kylie Tennant AO (/ˈkaɪli/; 12 March 1912 – 28 February 1988) was an Australian novelist, playwright, short-story writer, critic, biographer, and historian.

== Early life and career ==
Tennant was born in Manly, New South Wales; she was educated at Brighton College in Manly and Sydney University, though she left without graduating. She was a publicity officer for the Australian Broadcasting Commission, as well as working as a journalist, union organiser, reviewer (for The Sydney Morning Herald), a publisher's literary adviser and editor, and a member of the Commonwealth Literary Fund advisory board. She married L. C. Rodd in 1933; they had two children (a daughter, Benison, in 1946 and a son, John Laurence, in 1951).

Her work was known for its well-researched, realistic, yet positive portrayals of the lives of the underprivileged in Australia. In a video interview filmed in 1986, three years before her death, for the Australia Council's Archival Film Series, Tennant told how she lived as the people she wrote about, travelling as an unemployed itinerant worker during the Depression years, living in Aboriginal communities and spending a short time in prison for research.

Two of Tennant's novels, Battlers and Ride on Stranger, set in the 1930s, have been made into television mini-series.

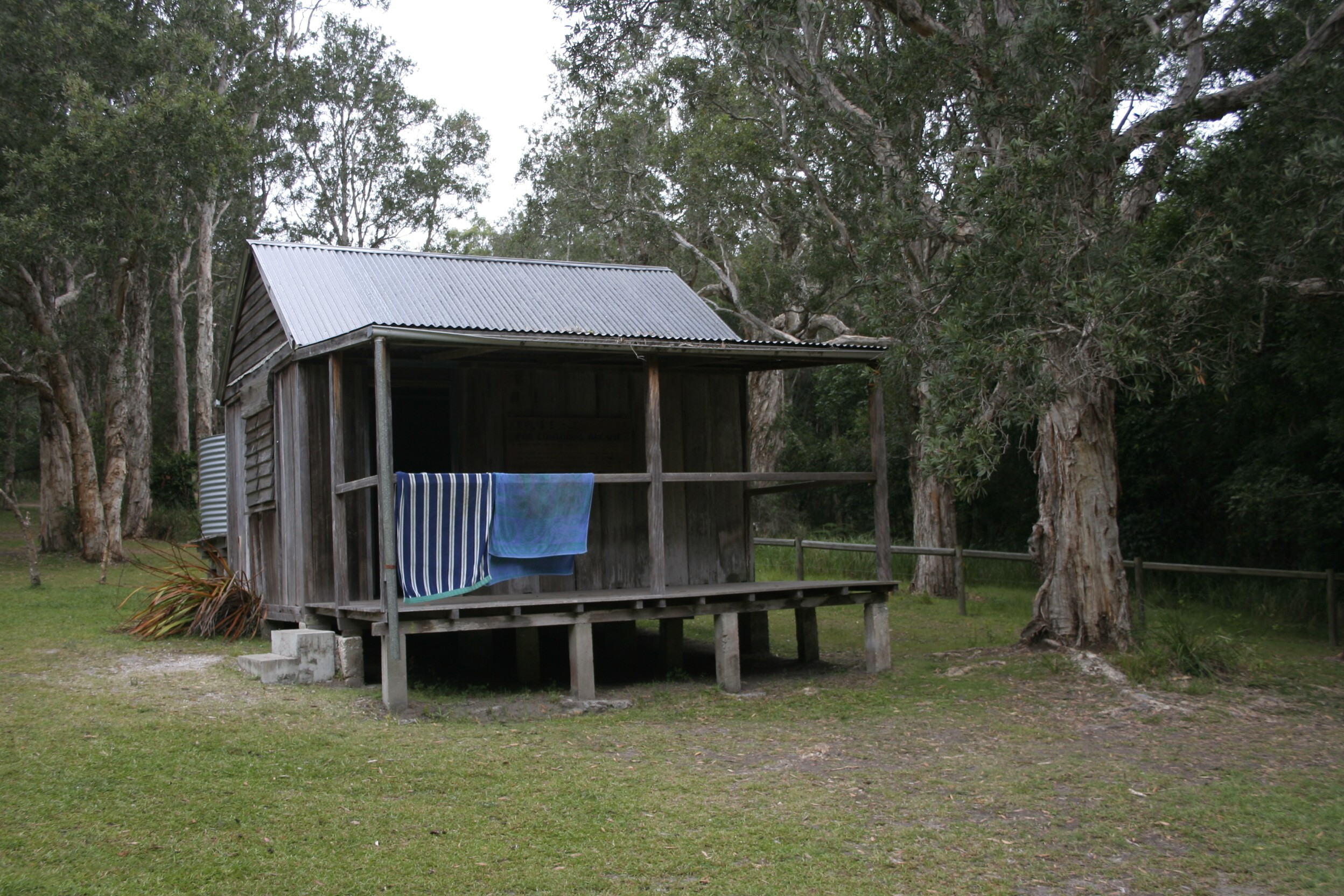
After World War II, Tennant worked in this hut, in Crowdy Bay National Park

"Kylie's Hut", the author's retreat in Crowdy Bay, was destroyed during the 2019–20 Australian bushfire season.

== Personal life ==
Tennant was raised in a devout Christian Science family and her mother was a Christian Science practitioner. She converted to Anglicanism upon her marriage, which her family supported.

== Awards ==
- 1935: S. H. Prior Memorial Prize awarded by The Bulletin magazine, for Tiburon
- 1940: S. H. Prior Memorial Prize (run by the Bulletin), for The Battlers, shared with Eve Langley, The Pea-Pickers, and Malcolm Henry Ellis's "John Murtagh Macrossan lectures".
- 1942: Australian Literature Society Gold Medal for The Battlers
- 1960: Children's Book Council Book Award for All the Proud Tribesmen
- 1980: Officer of the Order of Australia for services to literature

== Commemorations ==
Two streets are named for Tennant:

- Kylie Tennant Street, Franklin, ACT
- Kylie Tennant Close, Glenmore Park, NSW

== Bibliography ==
=== Novels ===
- Tiburon (1935. Sydney: Endeavour Press) — first published in serial form in The Bulletin
- Foveaux (1939. London: Gollancz; 1946. Sydney: Sirius)
- The Battlers (1941. London: Gollancz; New York: Macmillan; 1945. Sydney: Sirius)
- Time Enough Later (c.1942. New York: Macmillan; 1945. London: Macmillan). A humorous coming of age story about a young woman and her relationship with an artistic older man.
- Ride on Stranger (1943. New York: Macmillan; London: Gollancz; Sydney: Angus & Robertson)
- Lost Haven (1946. NY: Macmillan; Melbourne: Macmillan; London: Macmillan)
- The Joyful Condemned (1953. London: Macmillan; New York: St Martin's Press)
- The Honey Flow (1956. London: Macmillan; New York: St Martin's Press)
- Tell Morning This (1967. Sydney: Angus & Robertson) — complete version of The Joyful Condemned
- The Man on the Headland (1971. Sydney: Angus & Robertson)
- Tantavallon (1983. Melbourne: Macmillan) ISBN 0-947072-02-0

=== Short stories ===
- Ma Jones and Little White Cannibals (1967. London)

=== For children ===
- Long John Silver (1954. Sydney: Associated General Publications) — adapted from the screenplay by Martin Rackin
- All the Proud Tribesmen (1959. London: Macmillan; New York: St Martin's Press; 1960. Melbourne: Macmillan) — illustrated by Clem Seale. Children's Book Award (1960)
- Come and See: social studies for Third Grade (1960. Melbourne: Macmillan)
- We Find the Way: social studies for Fourth Grade (1960. Melbourne: Macmillan)
- Trail Blazers of the Air (1965. Melbourne: Macmillan; New York: St Martin's Press) — illustrated by Roderick Shaw

=== Plays ===
- Modern Plays for Schools 3 (John o' the Forest, Lady Dorothy and the Pirates, The Willow Pattern Plate, The Laughing Girl, Christmas at the Old Shamrock Hotel) (1950. London: Macmillan; New York: St Martin's Press)
- Tether a Dragon (1952. Sydney: Associated General Publications) — Commonwealth Jubilee Stage Play Prize
- Modern Plays for Schools 15 (The Bells of the City, The Magic Fat Baby, The Prince Who Met a Dragon, The Ghost Tiger, Hamaguchi Goh Ei) (1955. London: Macmillan; New York: St Martin's Press)
- The Bushrangers' Christmas Eve and other plays (The Tribe of the Honey Tree, The Ladies of the Guard, A Nativity Play, The Play of the Younger Son, The Emperor and the Nightingale) (1959. London: Macmillan; New York:St Martin's Press)
- Nex' Town (1957) - book for musical

=== Biography and history ===
- Australia: Her Story (1953. London: Macmillan; New York: St Martin's Press)
- Speak You So Gently: Lives among the Australian Aborigines (1959. London: Gollancz) — about the Rev Alf Clint
- Evatt: Politics and justice (1970. Sydney: Angus & Robertson)
- The Missing Heir (1986. Melbourne: Macmillan) — her autobiography

=== Criticism ===
- The Development of the Australian Novel (1958. Canberra: CLF)
- (with L.C. Rodd) The Australian Essay (1968. Melbourne: Cheshire)
