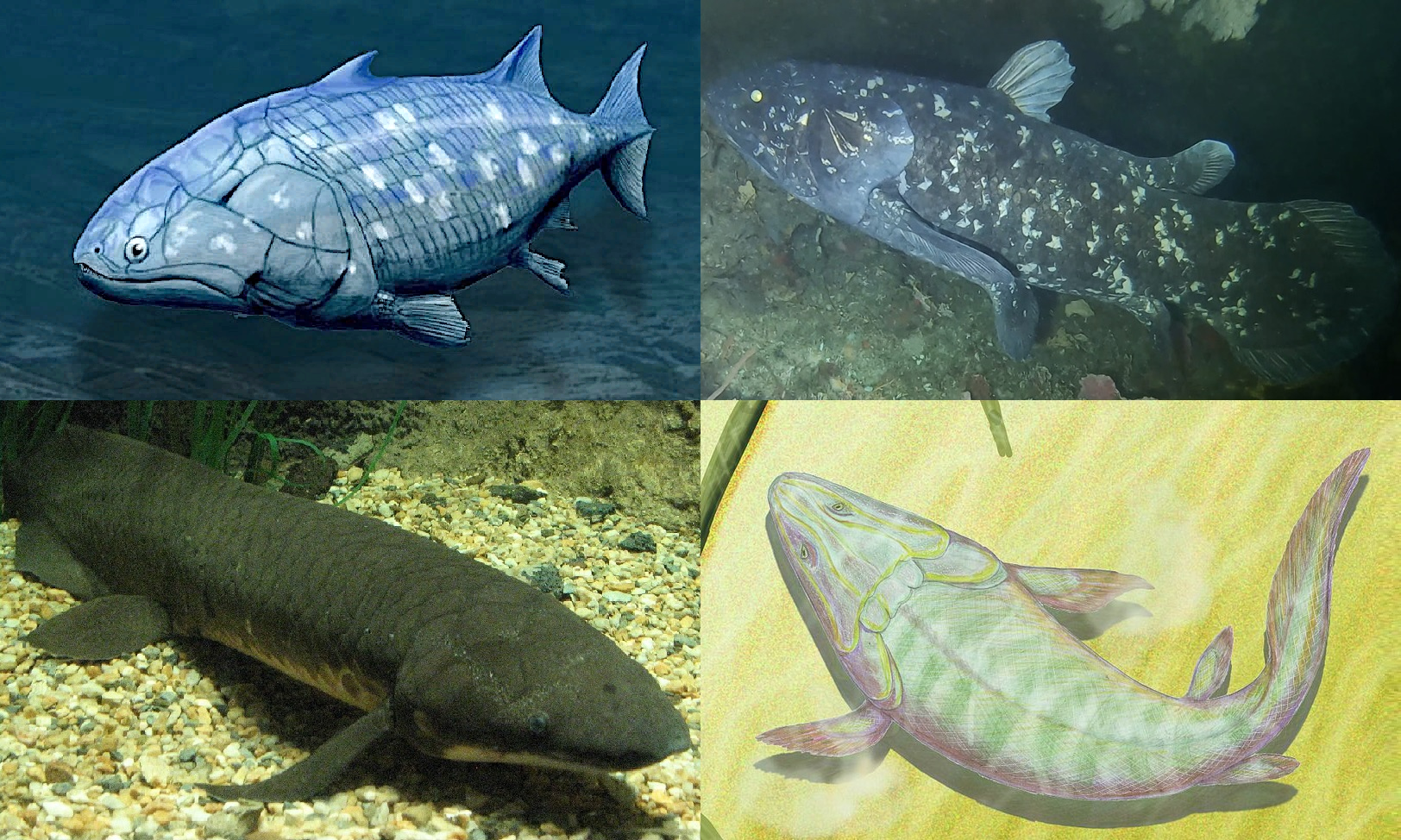
- From top to bottom and left to right, examples of sarcopterygians: Guiyu oneiros, West Indian Ocean coelacanth, Australian lungfish and the tetrapodomorph Panderichthys rhombolepis.

Scientific classification
- Kingdom: Animalia
- Phylum: Chordata
- Clade: Osteichthyes
- Clade: Sarcopterygii; Romer, 1955

Subgroups
- †Megamastax; †"Psarolepids"?; Guiyu; Sparalepis; Psarolepis; Achoania; Actinistia – coelacanths & relatives; †Onychodontiformes; Rhipidistia; Dipnomorpha – lungfish & relatives; Tetrapodomorpha – four-limbed vertebrates & relatives

Synonyms
- Crossopterygii

= Sarcopterygii =

Sarcopterygians Temporal range: Late Silurian–Present, 425–0 Ma

Clade of lobe-finned fish

Sarcopterygii (/ˌsɑːrkɒptəˈrɪdʒi.aɪ/; from Ancient Greek σάρξ (sárx) 'flesh' and πτέρυξ (ptérux) 'wing, fin') is a clade (traditionally a class or subclass) of vertebrate animals which includes a group of bony fishes and all four legged land animals, including humans. The common name for this clade is lobe-finned fish.

Lobe-finned fish have muscular limb buds (lobes) within their fins, which are supported by appendicular skeletons. This is in contrast to the other clade of bony fishes, the Actinopterygii, which have only skin-covered bony spines supporting the fins.

Sarcopterygii emerged in the Silurian and early Devonian periods consisting entirely of aquatic species, but today the vast majority of its species are land animals called tetrapods. This mostly terrestrial clade of vertebrates are now recognized as having evolved from sarcopterygian ancestors and are most closely related to lungfishes. The lobed fins evolved into limbs, and foregut diverticulum eventually evolved into air-breathing lungs. These changes made it possible for tetrapods to explore and eventually permeate terrestrial ecosystems. While it is technically correct to include tetrapod species with Sarcopterygii, the phrase "lobe-finned fish" normally refers to the aquatic species that are not tetrapods.

Most species of lobe-finned fish are now extinct, but during the Carboniferous and Permian periods these non-tetrapod sarcopterygians were dominant predators of freshwater ecosystems. The entire clade suffered significant decline after the Permian–Triassic extinction event known as the Great Dying. It is estimated that at least two thirds of tetrapod species went extinct during this time. The lobe-finned fish were hit even harder. Today, the only living non-tetrapod sarcopterygians are the two species of coelacanths and six species of lungfishes.

== Characteristics ==
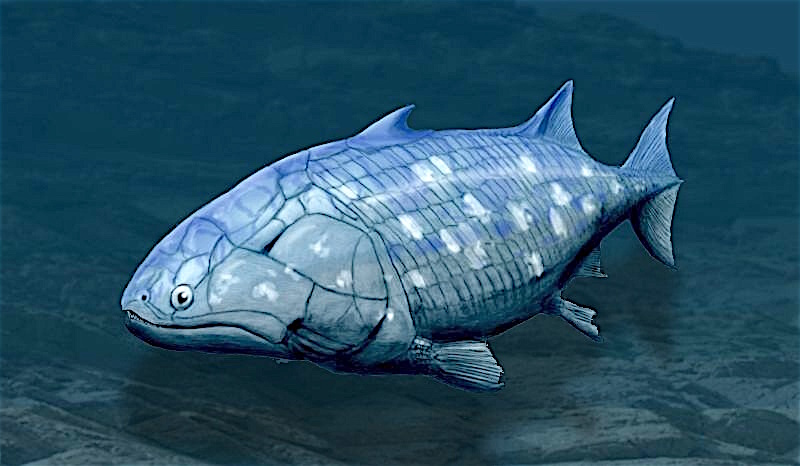
Guiyu oneiros, the earliest-known bony fish, lived during the Late Silurian, 419 million years ago). It has the combination of both ray-finned and lobe-finned features, although analysis of the totality of its features places it closer to lobe-finned fish.

Early lobe-finned fishes are bony fish with fleshy, lobed, paired fins, which are joined to the body by a single bone. The fins of lobe-finned fishes differ from those of all other fish groups in that each is borne on a fleshy, lobelike, scaly stalk extending from the body that resembles a limb bud. The scales of sarcopterygians are true scaloids, consisting of lamellar bone surrounded by layers of vascular bone, cosmine (similar to dentin), and external keratin. The physical structure of tetrapodomorphs, which bear a resemblance to tetrapods, provides valuable insights into the evolutionary shift from aquatic to terrestrial existence. Pectoral and pelvic fins have articulations resembling those of tetrapod limbs. The first tetrapod land vertebrates, basal amphibian organisms, possessed legs derived from these fins. Sarcopterygians also possess two dorsal fins with separate bases, as opposed to the single dorsal fin in ray-finned fish. The braincase of sarcopterygians primitively has a hinge line, but this is lost in tetrapods and lungfish. Early sarcopterygians commonly exhibit a symmetrical tail, while all sarcopterygians possess teeth that are coated with genuine enamel.

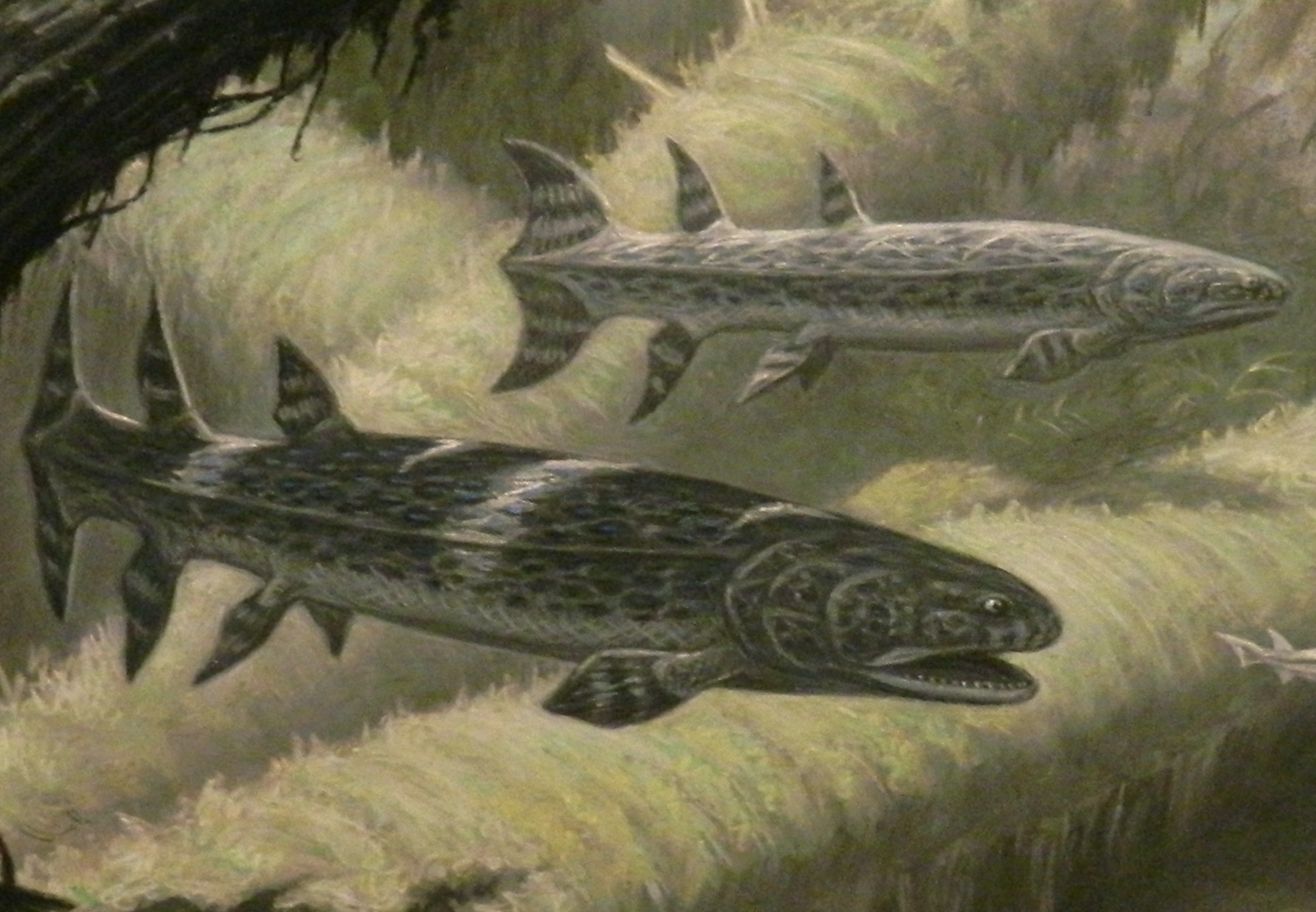
Tristichopterid Hyneria reached length up to 3.5 m (11 ft).

Most species of lobe-finned fishes are extinct. The largest known lobe-finned fish was Rhizodus hibberti from the Carboniferous period of Great Britain which reached up to 6 meters in length. Among the two groups of living species, the coelacanths and the lungfishes, the largest species is the West Indian Ocean coelacanth, reaching 2 m (6 ft 7 in) in length and weighing up 110 kg (240 lb). The largest lungfish is the marbled lungfish which can reach 2 m (6.6 ft) in length and weigh up to 50 kg (110 lb).

== Classification ==
Taxonomists who adhere to the cladistic approach include Tetrapoda within Sarcopterygii, sometimes under a Linnean rank such as infraclass or division. The fin-limbs found in lobe-finned fishes like the coelacanths display a strong resemblance to the presumed ancestral form of tetrapod limbs. Lobe-finned fishes seemingly underwent two distinct evolutionary paths, leading to their classification into two clades: the Rhipidistia (comprising the Dipnoi, or lungfish, and the Tetrapodomorpha, which includes the Tetrapoda) and the Actinistia (represented by coelacanths).

The extensive fossil record and numerous morphological and molecular studies have shown that lungfish and some fossil lobe-finned fish ("rhipidistians") are more closely related to tetrapods than they are to coelacanths; as a result tetrapods are nested within Sarcopterygii. This abides to cladistics in that in order for a group to be valid, it must have an ancestral species and all descendants of that common ancestor based on shared characteristics. As such mammals, sauropsids (birds and "reptiles"), and amphibians are highly derived sarcopterygians despite superficially looking nothing like the standard lobe-finned fish anatomically speaking. However, similarities can be noticed in their limb bones and tooth enamel. Additionally, lungfish and tetrapods share a divided atrium.

Multiple Linnean classifications have been proposed with the explicit intent to incorporate Sarcopterygii as a monophyletic taxon instead of maintaining its traditional paraphyletic definition.

=== Ahlberg (1991) ===
Class Osteichthyes

- Subclass Actinopterygii
- Subclass Sarcopterygii
  - Plesion Onychodontia
  - Infraclass Actinistia
  - Infraclass Rhipidistia
    - Superdivision Tetrapodomorpha
      - Plesion Rhizodontida
      - Plesion Osteolepiformes
      - Plesion Panderichthyidae
      - Division Tetrapoda
    - Superdivision Dipnomorpha
      - Plesion Porolepiformes
      - Plesion Powichthys
      - Plesion Youngolepis
      - Plesion Diabolepis
      - Division Dipnoi

=== Nelson et al. (2016) ===
Class Osteichthyes

- Subclass Actinopterygii
- Subclass Sarcopterygii
  - Infraclass Actinistia
  - †Infraclass Onychodontida
  - Infraclass Dipnomorpha
  - †Infraclass Rhizodontida
  - †Infraclass Osteolepidida
  - †Infraclass Elpistostegalia
  - Infraclass Tetrapoda

=== Betancur-Rodrigues et al. (2017) ===
Superclass Sarcopterygii

- Class Coelacanthimorpha
- Class Dipnotetrapodomorpha
  - Subclass Dipnomorpha
  - Subclass Tetrapodomorpha

Other classifications do not use Sarcopterygii as a ranked taxon but still reject traditional paraphyletic assemblages. In the scheme below, sarcopterygian groups are marked in bold letters.

=== Tedersoo (2017) ===
Phylum Craniata

- Class Cyclostomata
- Class Chondrichthyes
- Class Cladistia
- Class Actinopteri
- Class unspecified
- Class Ceratodontimorpha
- Class Amphibia
- Class Mammalia
- Class Sphenodontea
- Class Squamatea
- Class Testudinea
- Class Crocodylea
- Class Aves

=== Taxonomy ===
The classification below follows Benton (2004), and uses a synthesis of rank-based Linnaean taxonomy and also reflects evolutionary relationships. Benton included the clade Tetrapoda in the subclass Sarcopterygii in order to reflect the direct descent of tetrapods from lobe-finned fish, despite the former being assigned a higher taxonomic rank.

Clade	Example	Description
Actinistia	West Indian Ocean coelacanth	Actinistia, coelacanths, are a subclass of lobe-finned fishes, all but two of which are species known only through fossils. The subclass Actinistia contains the coelacanths, including the two living coelacanths: the West Indian Ocean coelacanth and the Indonesian coelacanth.
Dipnoi	Queensland lungfish	Dipnoi, commonly referred to as lungfish, but also known as salamanderfish, are a subclass of freshwater fish. Lungfish are best known for retaining characteristics primitive within the bony fishes, including the ability to breathe air, and structures primitive within the lobe-finned fishes, including the presence of lobed fins with a well-developed internal skeleton. Today, lungfish live only in Africa, South America, and Australia. While vicariance would suggest this represents an ancient distribution limited to the Mesozoic supercontinent Gondwana, the fossil record suggests advanced lungfish had a widespread freshwater distribution and the current distribution of modern lungfish species reflects extinction of many lineages following the breakup of Pangaea, Gondwana, and Laurasia.
Tetrapodomorpha	Advanced tetrapodomorph Tiktaalik	Tetrapodomorpha, tetrapods and their extinct relatives, are a clade of vertebrates consisting of tetrapods (four-limbed vertebrates) and their closest sarcopterygian relatives that are more closely related to living tetrapods than to living lungfish. Advanced forms transitional between fish and the early labyrinthodonts, like Tiktaalik, have been referred to as "fishapods" by their discoverers, being half-fish, half-tetrapods, in appearance and limb morphology. The Tetrapodomorpha contain the crown group tetrapods (the last common ancestor of living tetrapods and all of its descendants) and several groups of early stem tetrapods, and several groups of related lobe-finned fishes, collectively known as the osteolepiforms. The Tetrapodamorpha minus the crown group Tetrapoda are the stem tetrapoda, a paraphyletic unit encompassing the fish to tetrapod transition. Among the characters defining tetrapodomorphs are modifications to the fins, notably a humerus with convex head articulating with the glenoid fossa (the socket of the shoulder joint). Tetrapodomorph fossils are known from the early Devonian onwards, and include Osteolepis, Panderichthys, Kenichthys, and Tungsenia.

== Evolution ==
Evolution of lobe-finned fishes

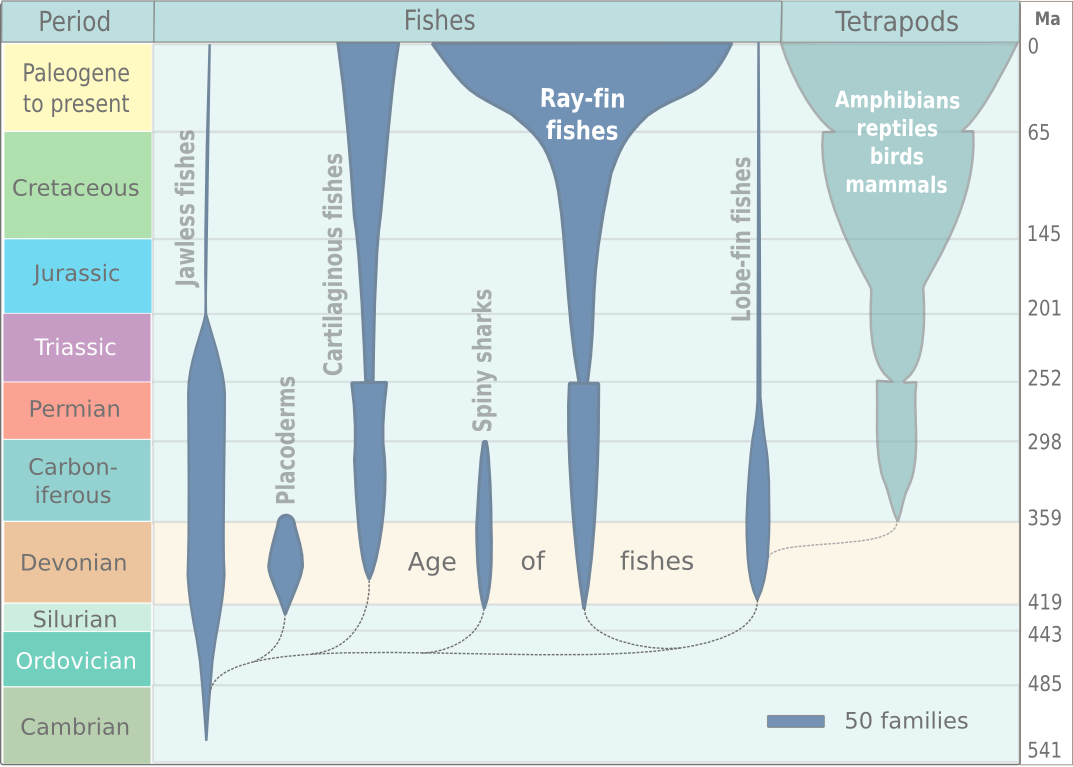
Spindle diagram for the evolution of lobe-finned fishes, tetrapods and other vertebrate classes

In Late Devonian vertebrate speciation, descendants of pelagic lobe-finned fish—like Eusthenopteron—exhibited a sequence of adaptations:
- Panderichthys, suited to muddy shallows;
- Tiktaalik with limb-like fins that could take it onto land;
- Early tetrapods in weed-filled swamps, such as:
  - Acanthostega, which had feet with eight digits,
  - Ichthyostega with limbs.
Descendants also included pelagic lobe-finned fish such as coelacanth species.

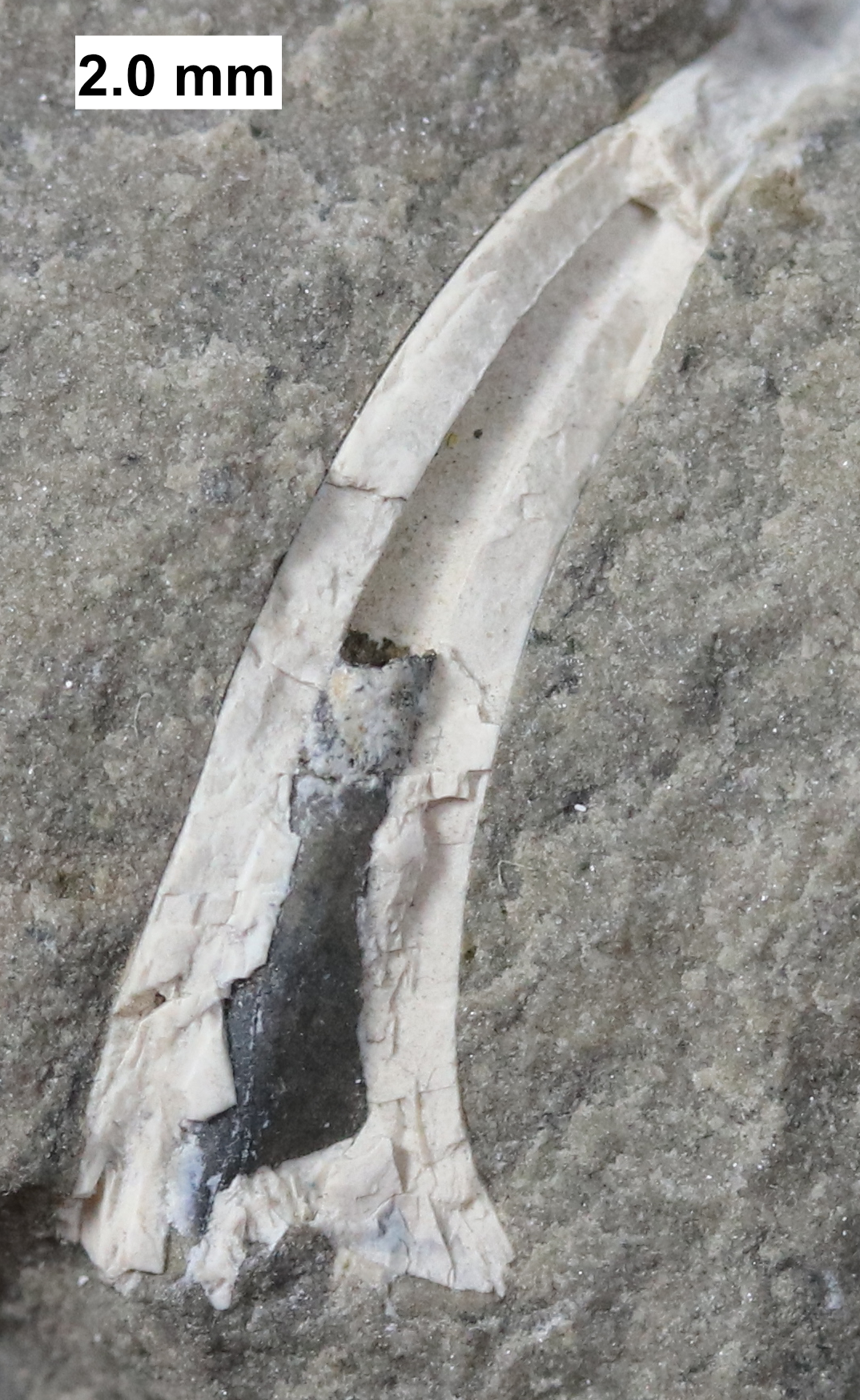
Tooth from the sarcopterygian Onychodus from the Devonian of Wisconsin

Lobe-finned fishes and their sister group, the ray-finned fishes, make up the clade Osteichthyes, characterized by the presence of swim bladders (which share ancestry with lungs) as well as the evolution of ossified endoskeleton instead of cartilages like the skeletons of acanthodians, chondrichthyians and most placoderms. There are otherwise vast differences in fin, respiratory and circulatory structures between the Sarcopterygii and the Actinopterygii, such as the presence of cosmoid layers in the scales of sarcopterygians. The earliest sarcopterygian fossils were found in the uppermost Silurian, about 418 Ma. They closely resembled the acanthodians (the "spiny fish", a taxon that became extinct at the end of the Paleozoic). In the early–middle Devonian (416–385 Ma), while the predatory placoderms dominated the seas, some sarcopterygians came into freshwater habitats.

In the Early Devonian (416–397 Ma), the sarcopterygians, or lobe-finned fishes, split into two main lineages: the coelacanths and the rhipidistians. Coelacanths never left the oceans and their heyday was the late Devonian and Carboniferous, from 385 to 299 Ma, as they were more common during those periods than in any other period in the Phanerozoic. Actinistians, a group within the lobe-finned fish, have been around for almost 380 million years. Over time, researchers have identified 121 species spread across 47 genera. Some species are well-documented in their evolutionary placement, while others are harder to track. The greatest boom in actinistian diversity happened during the Early Triassic, just after the Great Dying. Coelacanths of the genus Latimeria still live today in the open oceans and retained many primordial features of ancient sarcopterygians, earning them a reputation as living fossils.

The rhipidistians, whose ancestors probably lived in the oceans near river mouths and estuaries, left the marine world and migrated into freshwater habitats. They then split into two major groups: the lungfish and the tetrapodomorphs, and both of them evolved their swim bladders into air-breathing lungs. Lungfish radiated into their greatest diversity during the Triassic period; today, fewer than a dozen genera remain, having evolved the first proto-lungs and proto-limbs, adapting to living outside a submerged water environment by the middle Devonian (397–385 Ma). The tetrapodomorphs, on the other hand, evolved into the fully-limbed stegocephalians and later the fully terrestrial tetrapods during the Late Devonian, when the Late Devonian Extinction bottlenecked and selected against the more aquatically adapted groups among stem-tetrapods. The surviving tetrapods then underwent adaptive radiation on dry land and become the dominant terrestrial animals during the Carboniferous and the Permian periods.

=== Hypotheses for means of pre-adaptation ===
There are three major hypotheses as to how lungfish evolved their stubby fins (proto-limbs).

Shrinking waterhole
The first, traditional explanation is the "shrinking waterhole hypothesis", or "desert hypothesis", posited by the American paleontologist Alfred Romer, who believed that limbs and lungs may have evolved from the necessity of having to find new bodies of water as old waterholes dried up.

Inter-tidal adaptation
Niedźwiedzki, Szrek, Narkiewicz, et al. (2010) proposed a second, the "inter-tidal hypothesis": That sarcopterygians may have first emerged unto land from intertidal zones rather than inland bodies of water, based on the discovery of the 395 million-year-old Zachełmie tracks, the oldest discovered fossil evidence of tetrapods.

Woodland swamp adaptation
Retallack (2011) proposed a third hypothesis is dubbed the "woodland hypothesis": Retallack argues that limbs may have developed in shallow bodies of water, in woodlands, as a means of navigating in environments filled with roots and vegetation. He based his conclusions on the evidence that transitional tetrapod fossils are consistently found in habitats that were formerly humid and wooded floodplains.

Habitual escape onto land
A fourth, minority hypothesis posits that advancing onto land achieved more safety from predators, less competition for prey, and certain environmental advantages not found in water—such as oxygen concentration, (Note: Carroll, Irwin, & Green (2005), cited in) and temperature control (Note: Clack (2007), cited in)—implying that organisms developing limbs were also adapting to spending some of their time out of water. However, studies have found that sarcopterygians developed tetrapod-like limbs suitable for walking well before venturing onto land. (Note: King (2011), cited in) This suggests they adapted to walking on the ground-bed under water before they advanced onto dry land.

=== History through to the end-Permian extinction ===
The first tetrapodomorphs, which included the gigantic rhizodonts, had the same general anatomy as the lungfish, who were their closest kin, but they appear not to have left their water habitat until the late Devonian epoch (385–359 Ma), with the appearance of tetrapods (four-legged vertebrates). Tetrapods and megalichthyids are the only tetrapodomorphs which survived after the Devonian, with the latter group disappearing during the Permian.

Non-tetrapod sarcopterygians continued until towards the end of Paleozoic era, suffering heavy losses during the Permian–Triassic extinction event (251 Ma).

=== Phylogeny ===
The cladogram presented below is based on studies compiled by Janvier et al. (1997) for the Tree of Life Web Project, Mikko's Phylogeny Archive and Swartz (2012).

- Sarcopterygii
  - †Onychodontidae
  - Actinistia (coelacanths)
  - Rhipidistia
    - †Styloichthys changae Zhu & Yu, 2002
    - Dipnomorpha
      - †Porolepiformes
      - Dipnoi (lungfishes)
    - Tetrapodomorpha
      - ?†Tungsenia paradoxa Lu et al., 2012
      - †Kenichthys campbelli Chang & Zhu, 1993
      - - †Rhizodontiformes
        - - ?†Thysanolepidae
          - †Canowindridae
          - - †Osteolepiformes
            - Eotetrapodiformes
              - †Tristichopteridae
              - - †Tinirau clackae Swartz, 2012
                - - †Platycephalichthys Vorobyeva, 1959
                  - Elpistostegalia
                    - †Panderichthys rhombolepis Gross, 1941
                    - - †Elpistostegidae
                      - Stegocephalia
                        - †Elginerpeton
                        - - - †Metaxygnathus denticulus Campbell & Bell, 1977
                            - †Ventastega curonica
                          - Tetrapoda s.s.

- Sarcopterygii incertae sedis
  - †Guiyu oneiros Zhu et al., 2009
  - †Diabolepis speratus (Chang & Yu, 1984)
  - †Langdenia campylognatha Janvier & Phuong, 1999
  - †Ligulalepis Schultze, 1968
  - †Meemannia eos Zhu, Yu, Wang, Zhao & Jia, 2006
  - †Psarolepis romeri Yu 1998 sensu Zhu, Yu, Wang, Zhao & Jia, 2006
  - †Megamastax ambylodus Choo, Zhu, Zhao, Jia, & Zhu, 2014
  - †Sparalepis tingi Choo, Zhu, Qu, Yu, Jia & Zhaoh, 2017

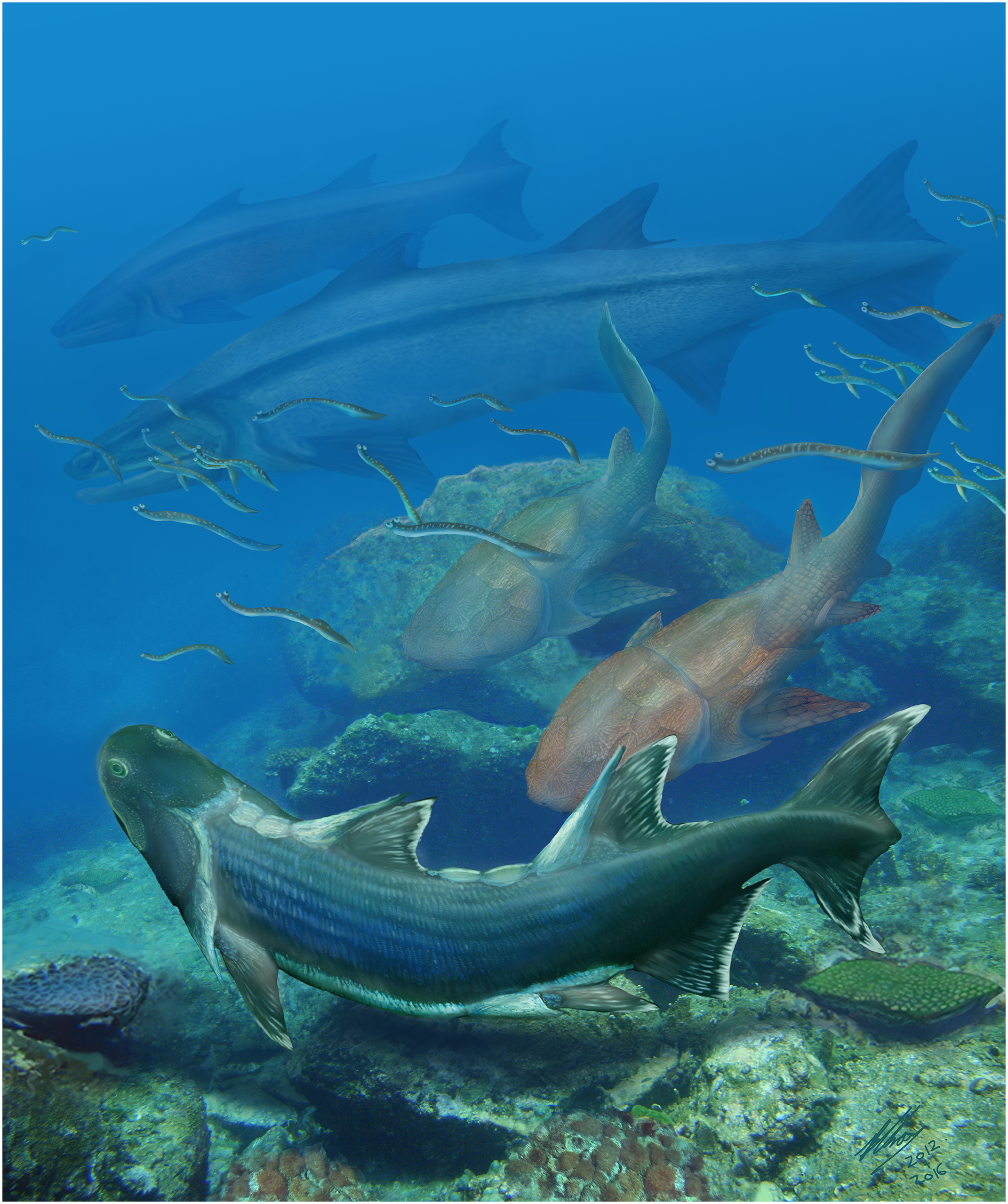
Life restoration of Sparalepis tingi and other fauna from the Silurian of Yunnan

- paraphyletic Osteolepida incertae sedis| (Note: The Osteolepida taxa were not addressed by Ahlberg & Johanson (1998).)
  - †Bogdanovia orientalis Obrucheva 1955 [has been treated as Coelacanthinimorph sarcopterygian]
  - †Canningius groenlandicus Säve-Söderbergh, 1937
  - †Chrysolepis
  - †Geiserolepis
  - †Latvius
    - †L. grewingki (Gross, 1933)
    - †L. porosus Jarvik, 1948
    - †L. obrutus Vorobyeva, 1977
  - †Lohsania utahensis Vaughn, 1962
  - †Megadonichthys kurikae Vorobyeva, 1962
  - †Platyethmoidia antarctica Young, Long & Ritchie, 1992
  - †Shirolepis ananjevi Vorobeva, 1977
  - †Sterropterygion brandei Thomson, 1972
  - †Thaumatolepis edelsteini Obruchev, 1941
  - †Thysanolepis micans Vorobyeva, 1977
  - †Vorobjevaia dolonodon Young, Long & Ritchie, 1992
- paraphyletic Elpistostegalia/Panderichthyida incertae sedis
  - †Parapanderichthys stolbovi (Vorobyeva, 1960) Vorobyeva, 1992
  - †Howittichthys warrenae Long & Holland, 2008
  - †Livoniana multidentata Ahlberg, Luksevic & Mark-Kurik, 2000
- Stegocephalia incertae sedis
  - †Antlerpeton clarkii Thomson, Shubin & Poole, 1998
  - †Austrobrachyops jenseni Colbert & Cosgriff, 1974
  - †Broilisaurus raniceps (Goldenberg, 1873) Kuhn, 1938
  - †Densignathus rowei Daeschler, 2000
  - †Doragnathus woodi Smithson, 1980
  - †Jakubsonia livnensis Lebedev, 2004
  - †Limnerpeton dubium Fritsch, 1901 (nomen dubium)
  - †Limnosceloides Romer, 1952
    - †L. dunkardensis Romer, 1952 (Type)
    - †L. brahycoles Langston, 1966
  - †Occidens portlocki Clack & Ahlberg, 2004
  - †Ossinodus puerorum emend Warren & Turner, 2004
  - †Romeriscus periallus Baird & Carroll, 1968
  - †Sigournea multidentata Bolt & Lombard, 2006
  - †Sinostega pani Zhu et al., 2002
  - †Ymeria denticulata Clack et al., 2012

== See also ==
- List of sarcopterygian genera
- Cladistic Classification of Class Sarcopterygii
