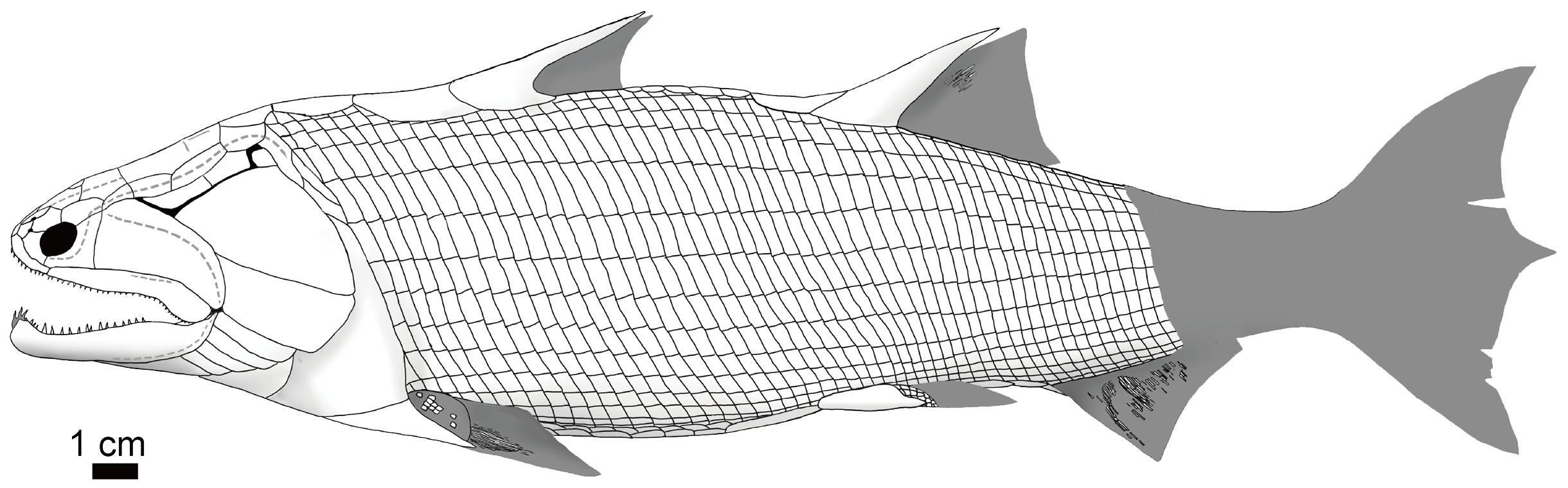
- Skeletal reconstruction

Scientific classification
- Kingdom: Animalia
- Phylum: Chordata
- Clade: Osteichthyes
- Genus: †Guiyu; Zhu et al., 2009
- Species: †G. oneiros

Binomial name
- †Guiyu oneiros Zhu et al., 2009

= Guiyu oneiros =

Guiyu Temporal range: Late Silurian, 425.6 Ma

Extinct species of bony fish

Guiyu oneiros is one of the earliest articulated bony fish discovered. Fossils of Guiyu have been found in what is now Qujing, Yunnan, China, in late Silurian marine strata, about 425 million years old. Guiyu is part of the Xiaoxiang fauna which is rich in fossils representing a marine ecosystem. Found in the late Ludlow-aged Kuanti Formation, the remains were dated using conodonts as index fossils. The Xiaoxiang fauna also includes galeaspids, placoderms and acanthodians.

== Discovery and naming ==
Guiyu was described by Chinese palaeontologist Zhu Min (朱敏) and others in 2009, based on a near-complete articulated specimen. The generic name Guiyu is a transliteration of the Mandarin 鬼魚 guǐyú "ghost fish" and the specific name oneiros is from Greek ὄνειρος "dream".

== Description ==
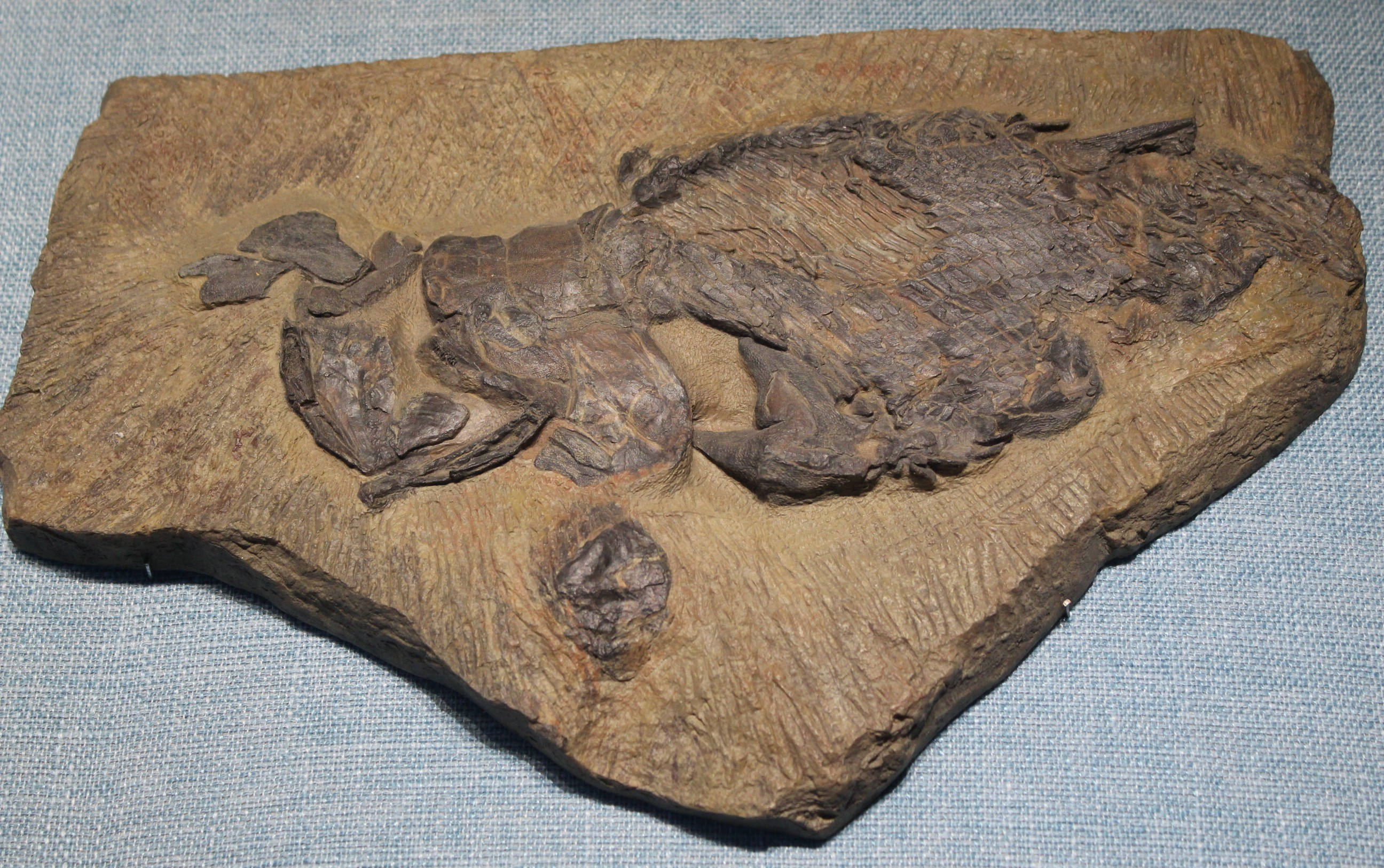
Specimen on display at the Paleozoological Museum of China

The holotype specimen is about 26 centimetres (10 in) in length and about 11 centimetres (4.3 in) in depth. The caudal fin has not been preserved, and the living fish is estimated to have been around 30 centimetres (12 in) long. The head made up about 23% of the body length, and the body had a streamlined shape. It possessed several primitive features characteristic of placoderms (jawed stem-gnathostomes) but missing in modern osteichthyans. While the pelvic girdle of modern osteichthyans is made exclusively of endochondral bone, the pelvis of Guiyu included dermal bones as well, including paired lateral plates and an unpaired median plate. The pectoral, pelvic and dorsal fins bore large spines, as seen in many placoderms and acanthodians (basal stem-chondrichthyans). Behind the skull roof there were three median dorsal plates (bones that made up part of the thoracic armour in most placoderms), with the third plate bearing the first dorsal fin spine. The skull bones, scales and other dermal bones were covered in ganoine, a tissue that also covers the scales and cranial bones in basal ray-finned fishes.

== Classification ==
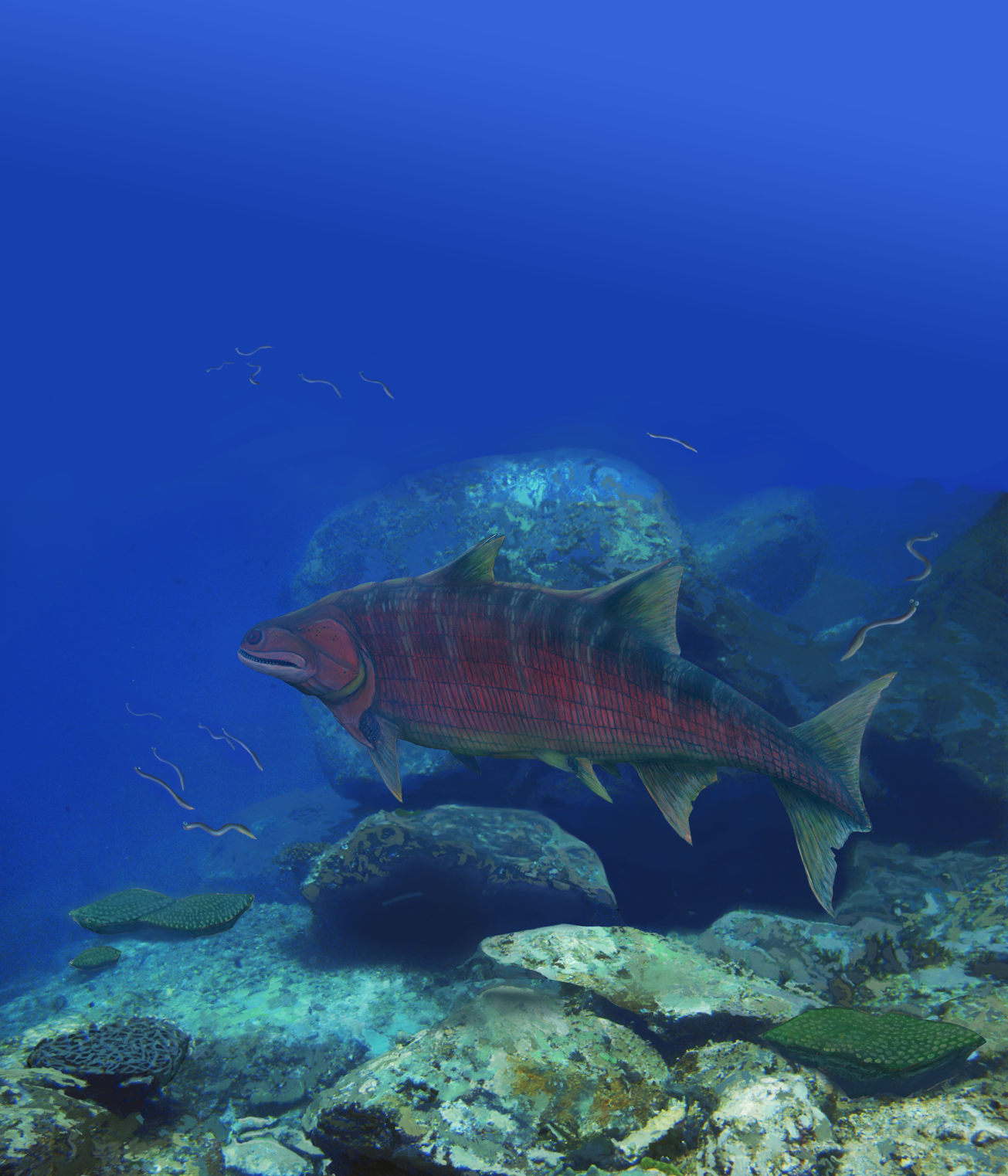
Life restoration

Guiyu was initially described as a basal lobe-finned fish with anatomical features of both ray-finned and lobe-finned fishes. Guiyu sheds light on the early diversification of bony fishes. This clade, the osteichthyans, splits in two clades: the lobe-finned fishes (sarcopterygians) and the ray-finned fishes (actinopterygians). If Guiyu was a sarcopterygian, this split must have already occurred by the late Silurian period, no later than 419 million years ago (original estimate) or 425 Ma (recent estimate). Guiyu has frequently been placed in a clade with three other primitive osteichthyans (Achoania, Psarolepis and Sparalepis); this clade has been informally dubbed the "psarolepids".

The cladogram below follows the analysis of Yu et al. (2010), which recovered Guiyu as a basal sarcopterygian:

- Sarcopterygii
  - - - - - Rhipidistia →Lungfish and Tetrapoda
          - Styloichthys
        - - Actinistia
            - Coelacanthiformes
            - Eoactinistia
          - Onychodontiformes
      - - - Achoania
          - Psarolepis
        - Guiyu
    - Meemannia
  - Ligulalepis

The many primitive features of Guiyu and other "psarolepids" have led palaeontologists to suggest that they were stem-group osteichthyans instead, lying outside the clade formed by actinopterygians and sarcopterygians. This theory had little support from phylogenetic analyses until the 2017 description of Ptyctolepis, a stem-sarcopterygian from the Early Devonian of China. The accompanying phylogenetic analysis recovered Guiyu and the other "psarolepids" as the sister group of crown-osteichthyans. A cladogram from that study is shown below:

- - Janusiscus
  - - Chondrichthyes
    - - Dialipina
      - - 'Ligulalepis'
        - - - Guiyu
            - - Sparalepis
              - - Achoania
                - Psarolepis
          - - Actinopterygii
              - Meemannia
              - - Cheirolepis
                - Other Actinopterygii
            - Sarcopterygii
              - Ptyctolepis
              - - - Onychodonts
                  - Coelacanths
                - - Dipnomorpha
                  - Tetrapodomorpha
