= Meemann Chang =

Chinese paleontologist

- 张弥曼
- Born: 17 April 1936 (age 90); Nanjing, Jiangsu, China
- Other names: Zhang Miman; Mee-mann Chang
- Education: Moscow University; Stockholm University
- Occupation: Paleontologist
- Awards: L'Oréal-UNESCO Awards for Women in Science (2018)
- Scientific career
- Fields: Vertebrate paleontology
- Workplaces: Institute of Vertebrate Paleontology and Paleoanthropology
- Doctoral students: Zhou Zhonghe
- Other notable students: Xiaobo Yu

Chinese name
- Simplified Chinese: 张弥曼
- Traditional Chinese: 張彌曼
Transcriptions
Standard Mandarin
- Hanyu Pinyin: Zhāng Mímàn

Meemann Chang (Chinese: 张弥曼; born 17 April 1936), also known as Zhang Miman, is a Chinese paleontologist at the Institute of Vertebrate Paleontology and Paleoanthropology (IVPP). She completed her undergraduate studies at Moscow University and completed her PhD thesis entitled 'The braincase of Youngolepis, a Lower Devonian crossopterygian from Yunnan, south-western China' at Stockholm University. She was the first woman to become head of IVPP in 1983. For her many career achievements, she received an honorary degree from the University of Chicago in 2011 and the Romer-Simpson Medal from the Society of Vertebrate Paleontology in 2016.

== Biography ==
Zhang was born into a wealthy and highly educated family in Nanjing, Jiangsu, on 17 April 1936, while her ancestral home is in Shengzhou, Zhejiang. Her father graduated from the University of Chicago. As a child, she was determined to become a doctor. After the Second Sino-Japanese War broke out, her family fled to different cities to take refuge. After initially living in Beibei, Sichuan, they then moved to Jiangxi, and finally they settled in Nantong.

After graduating from Shanghai Tongji High School in 1953, she was admitted to Beijing Institute of Geology (now China University of Geosciences (Beijing)). Soon after, she was sent to Moscow State University to study at the expense of the government. When she returned to China, she was dispatched to the Institute of Vertebrate Paleontology and Paleoanthropology of the Chinese Academy of Sciences. In 1965, she became a visiting scholar at the National Museum of Natural Science in Sweden. After the reform and opening up in 1980, she went to Sweden again and received her PhD from Stockholm University in 1982. She was director of the Institute of Vertebrate Paleontology and Paleoanthropology in 1983 and held that office until 1990. She became chairman of the Paleontological Society of China in 1993, and served until 1997.

In 2011, she was awarded an honorary doctor of science degree from the University of Chicago. On 5 October 2015, she received an honorary doctoral degree from the Richard Gilder Graduate School of the American Museum of Natural History. On 2 July 2021, asteroid 347336 was named after her.

== Contributions ==
Species named in her honour include the extinct sarcopterygian fish Meemannia, the theropod dinosaur Sinovenator changii, and the extinct ornithuromorph birds Archaeornithura meemannae and Meemannavis ductrix. There is also a unique organ of yunnanolepid antiarch placoderms named "Chang's Apparatus" after her.

Elliott, David K.; Maisey, John G.; Yu, Xiaobo; Miao, Desui (2010), Morphology, Phylogeny and Paleobiogeography of Fossil Fishes, Munich: Verlag Dr. Friedrich Pfeil, ISBN 978-3-89937-122-2, a special book volume on fossil fish, was published in her honour.

Chang notably first described and later re-described the fossil genus Paralycoptera, and also described the fossil genera Diabolepis and Youngolepis.

== Selected publications ==
- Liu, H. & Chang, M. First discovery of helicoprionid in China. Vertebrata PalAsiatica (1963).
- Chang, M New materials of Mesoclupea from southeastern China and on the systematic position of the genus. Vertebrata PalAsiatica (1963).
- Chang, M. & Chou, J. On the fossil fishes in Mesozoic and Cenozoic oil-bearing strata from east China and their sedimentary environment. Vertebrata PalAsiatica (1978).
- Chang, M. Palaeontology: Fossil fish up for election. Nature 403, 152–153 (2000).
- Chang, M., Miao, D., Chen, Y., Zhou, J. & Chen, P. Suckers (Fish, Catostomidae) from the Eocene of China account for the family's current disjunct distributions. Sci. China Ser. D-Earth Sci. 44, 577–586 (2001).
- Chang, M., Peiji, C., Yuanqing, W. & Yuan, W. Jehol Biota. Shanghai: Shanghai Scientific and (2003).
- Chen, G., Fang, F. & Chang, M. A new cyprinid closely related to cultrins+xenocyprinins from the mid-Tertiary of South China. J. Vertebr. Paleontol. 25, 492–501 (2005).
- Chang, M., Zhang, J. & Miao, D. A lamprey from the Cretaceous Jehol biota of China. Nature 441, 972–974 (2006).
- Wang, X. ... Chang, M. et al. Vertebrate paleontology, biostratigraphy, geochronology, and paleoenvironment of Qaidam Basin in northern Tibetan Plateau. Palaeogeogr. Palaeoclimatol. Palaeoecol. 254, 363–385 (2007).
- Chang, M. et al. Extraordinarily thick-boned fish linked to the aridification of the Qaidam Basin (northern Tibetan Plateau). Proceedings of the National Academy of Sciences 105, 13246–13251 (2008).
- Liu, J. & Chang, M. A new Eocene catostomid (Teleostei: Cypriniformes) from northeastern China and early divergence of Catostomidae. Sci. China Ser. D-Earth Sci. 52, 189–202 (2009).
- Xu, G.-H. & Chang, M. Redescription of †Paralycoptera wui Chang & Chou, 1977 (Teleostei: Osteoglossoidei) from the Early Cretaceous of eastern China. Zool. J. Linn. Soc. 157, 83–106 (2009).
- Wang, N. & Chang, M. Pliocene cyprinids (Cypriniformes, Teleostei) from Kunlun Pass Basin, northeastern Tibetan Plateau and their bearings on development of water system and uplift of the area. Sci. China Earth Sci. 53, 485–500 (2010).
- Chen, G. & Chang, M. A new early cyprinin from Oligocene of South China. Sci. China Earth Sci. 54, 481–492 (2011).
- Wang, N. & Chang, M. Discovery of fossil Nemacheilids (Cypriniformes, Teleostei, Pisces) from the Tibetan Plateau, China. Sci. China Earth Sci. 55, 714–727 (2012).

== Honours ==
- 1991 Member of the Chinese Academy of Engineering
- 1995 Foreign Fellow of the Linnean Society of London
- 2011 Foreign Fellow of the Royal Swedish Academy of Sciences
- 2015 Doctor of Science, Honoris Causa [Richard Gilder Graduate School of the American Museum of Natural History]
- 2016 Romer-Simpson Medal, Society of Vertebrate Paleontology
- 2018 and 2019 Asian Scientist 100, Asian Scientist

== Awards ==
On November 13, 2017, Chang was awarded the L'Oréal-UNESCO Awards for Women in Science. She was nominated for "her pioneering work on fossil records leading to insights on how aquatic vertebrates adapted to life and land." In November 2017, Chang was also awarded the Ho Leung Ho Lee Foundation Achievement Prize.
