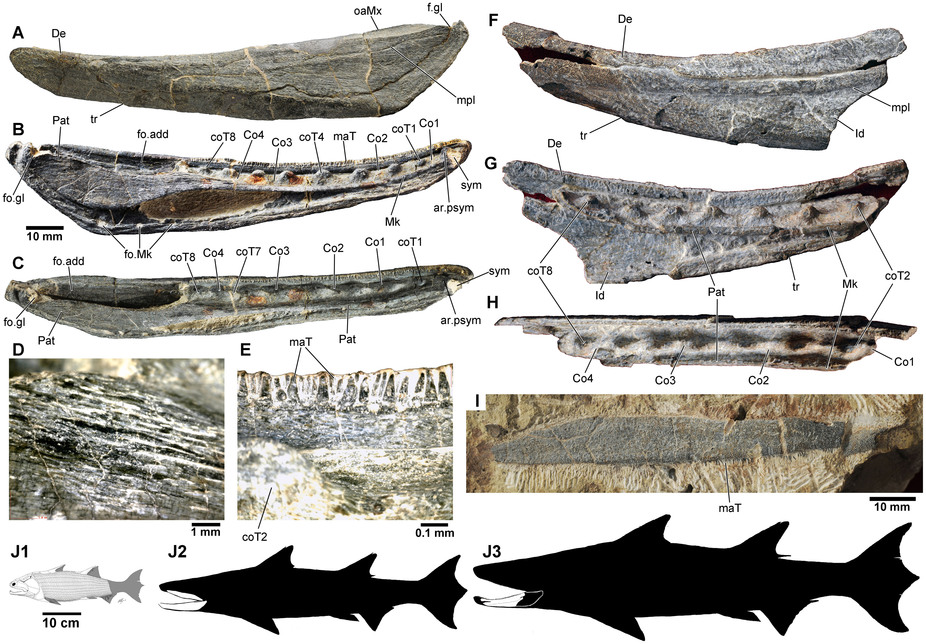
- Megamastax fossils and estimated body length charts

Scientific classification
- Kingdom: Animalia
- Phylum: Chordata
- Clade: Eugnathostomata
- Clade: Osteichthyes
- Genus: †Megamastax; Choo et al., 2014

Type species
- †Megamastax amblyodus Choo et al., 2014

= Megamastax =

Megamastax Temporal range: Late Silurian, 423 Ma

Extinct genus of bony fishes

Megamastax (meaning "big mouth") is a genus of stem bony fish which lived during the late Silurian period, about 423 million years ago, in China. Before the discovery of Megamastax, it was thought that jawed vertebrates (gnathostomes) were limited in size and variation before the Devonian period. When first described, Megamastax was known only from jaw bones, but more recently, articulated head and trunk remains were also found. It is estimated that it reached about 1 metre (3 ft 3 in) long.

== Discovery and naming ==
Fossils of Megamastax were found in a layer of the Kuanti Formation in Qujing, Yunnan, China. The holotype of Megamastax amblyodus is IVPP V18499.1, a complete left mandible. Two additional specimens, IVPP V18499.2 (a partial left mandible) and IVPP V18499.3 (a right maxilla) have been referred to the species.

The generic name of Megamastax is Greek for "big mouth", derived from megalos (big) and mastax (mouth). The species name, amblyodus, translates to "blunt tooth".

== Description ==
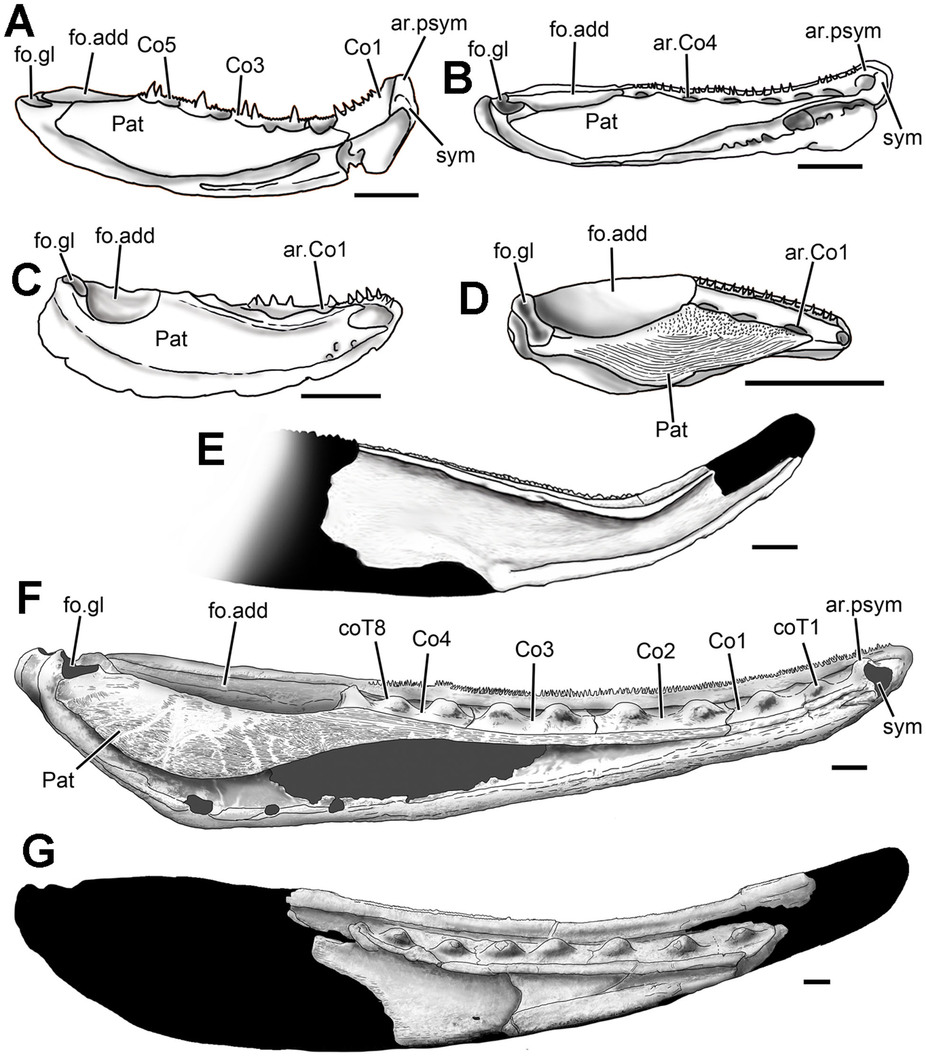
The lower jaws of Megamastax (F, G) compared to other Silurian jawed fish

Although Megamastax resembles sarcopterygians (lobe-finned fish) in having cosmine on its jaws, coronoid plates, a prearticular bone, and a biconcave glenoid, it is unique among early jawed fish for its jaw and teeth structure. Although most early osteichthyans have only one row of sharp marginal teeth along the edge of the jaw, Megamastax has two rows of small marginal teeth. While the original description concludedMegamastax uniquely had a row of large, blunt teeth fused to four coronoid bones on the inside edge of each mandible, it now appears that those features were really blunt attachment bases supporting tooth plates. Similar genera such as Psarolepis and Guiyu have sharp fangs on their five coronoids while poroplepiformes and tetrapodomorphs have tusk-like teeth and three coronoids.

Using the body plans of Devonian osteichthyans as a guide, it can be estimated that the mandibles of Megamastax occupy between a fifth and a seventh of the total body length. If this is true, then IVPP V18499.1 had a length of .65–.9 metres (2 ft 2 in – 2 ft 11 in) and IVPP V18499.2 had a length of .87–1.22 metres (2 ft 10 in – 4 ft 0 in). Given these large estimates, Megamastax was the largest known Silurian vertebrate.

== Paleobiology ==
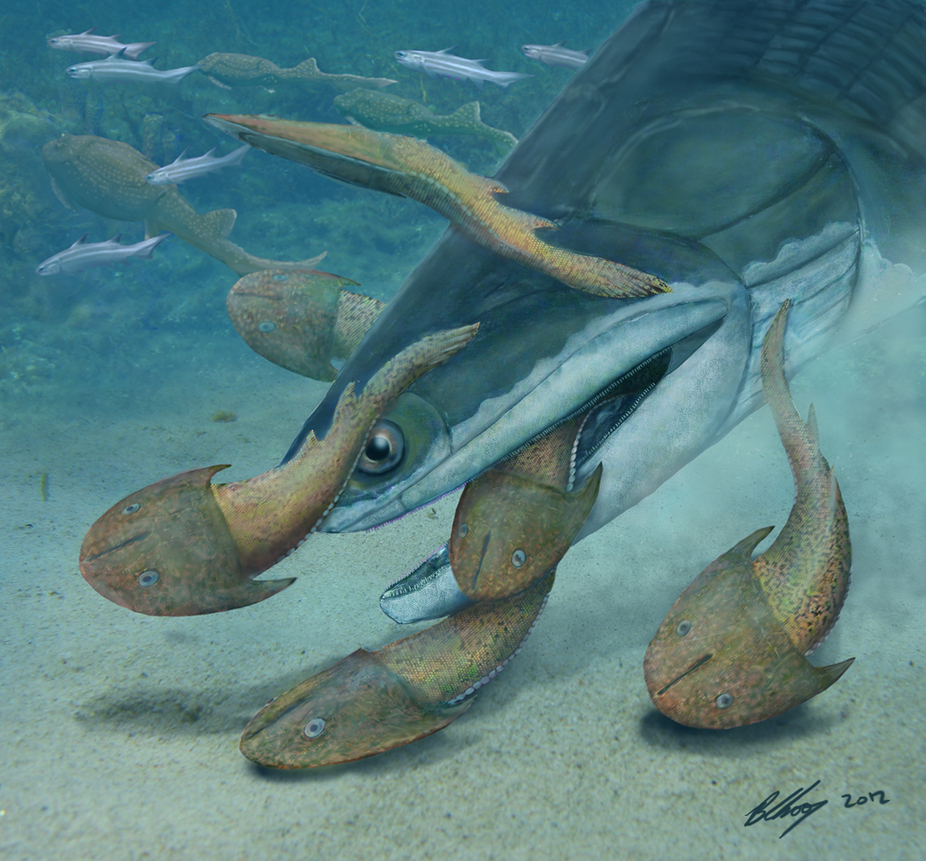
Life restoration of Megamastax feeding on Dunyu

With rounded coronoid teeth, Megamastax could have fed on hard-shelled animals. Extant fish with crushing teeth, such as wolf eels and horn sharks, generally have such teeth at the front of the jaw, separate from the coronoids. Although Megamastax differs from these fish by having its teeth and coronoids run the entire length of the jaw, this could simply be a result of having a different method of prey capture. While low body sizes for Silurian vertebrates has traditionally been seen as a result of the Silurian having low levels of atmospheric oxygen (as large vertebrates are susceptible to hypoxia), recent analyses have shown that terrestrial plant life was more well established in the Silurian than once thought, providing a previously unknown source of oxygen. In addition, new Paleozoic atmospheric models indicate that oxygen levels were actually around modern levels by the end of the Silurian period. Although it is not certain that Megamastax's large size is a result of this atmospheric trend, the presence of such a large fish at this period does weaken the argument that a lack of large Silurian vertebrates can be used as evidence of low oxygen levels.

== Paleoecology ==
Various hard-shelled animals were present in the late Silurian of China, including brachipods, molluscs, trilobites, and even armored fish like placoderms and galeaspids. Due to its large size and predatory lifestyle, Megamastax could be considered the first vertebrate apex predator.
