= Guiyu =

Guiyu may refer to:

- Guiyu oneiros (鬼鱼), extinct bony fish
- Guiyu (town) (贵屿镇), town in Chaoyang District, Shantou, Guangdong, China
