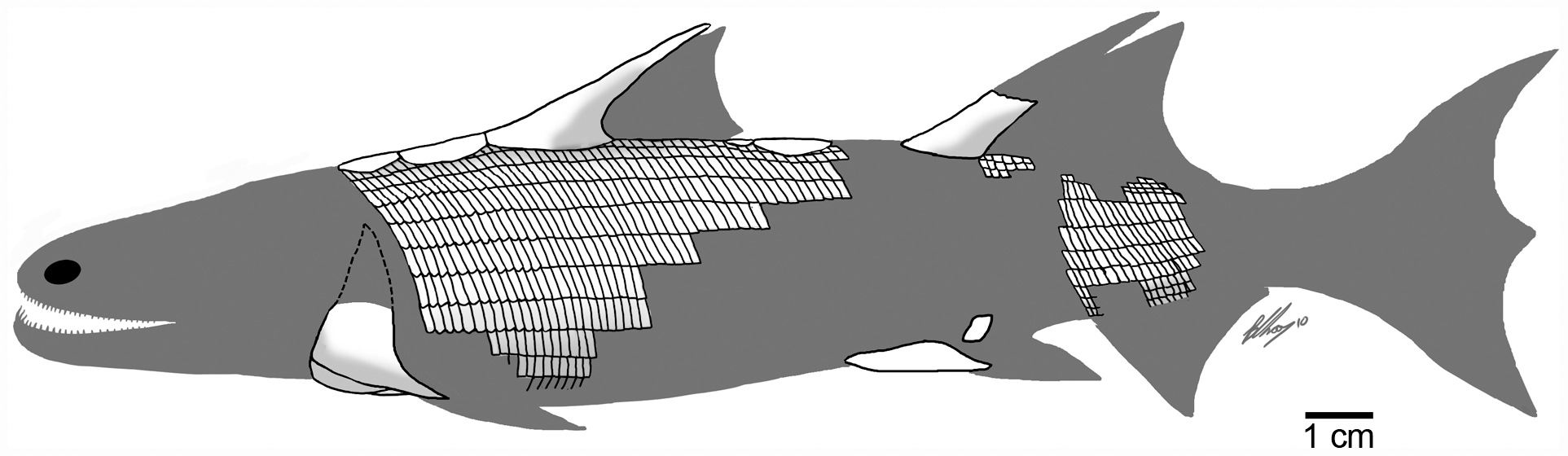
- Reconstruction of holotype of Sparalepis tingi

Scientific classification
- Kingdom: Animalia
- Phylum: Chordata
- Clade: Osteichthyes
- Genus: †Sparalepis; Choo, Zhu, Qu, Yu, Jia & Zhao, 2017
- Species: †S. tingi

Binomial name
- †Sparalepis tingi Choo, Zhu, Qu, Yu, Jia & Zhao, 2017

= Sparalepis =

Sparalepis Temporal range: Late Silurian, 423 mya

Extinct genus of bony fishes

Sparalepis is an extinct genus of osteichthyan fish that lived during the Late Silurian period of Yunnan, China around 423 million years ago. It contains a single species, Sparalepis tingi. It is a member of the Xiaoxiang Fauna.

== Discovery ==
It was discovered from Southwestern China, Yunnan in the Kuanti Formation. The holotype specimen includes partial post cranium material and associated cleithrum, interclavicle and pelvic girdle.

The genus name is from the Persian word "spara" meaning shield and from the Greek word "lepis" meaning scale. This is reference to the scales resemblance to depictions of rectangular wicker shields carried by the Sparabara infantry of the Achaemenid empire. The species name is named in honor of V. K. Ting, a Chinese geologist was a pioneer in geology of Yunnan.

== Description ==
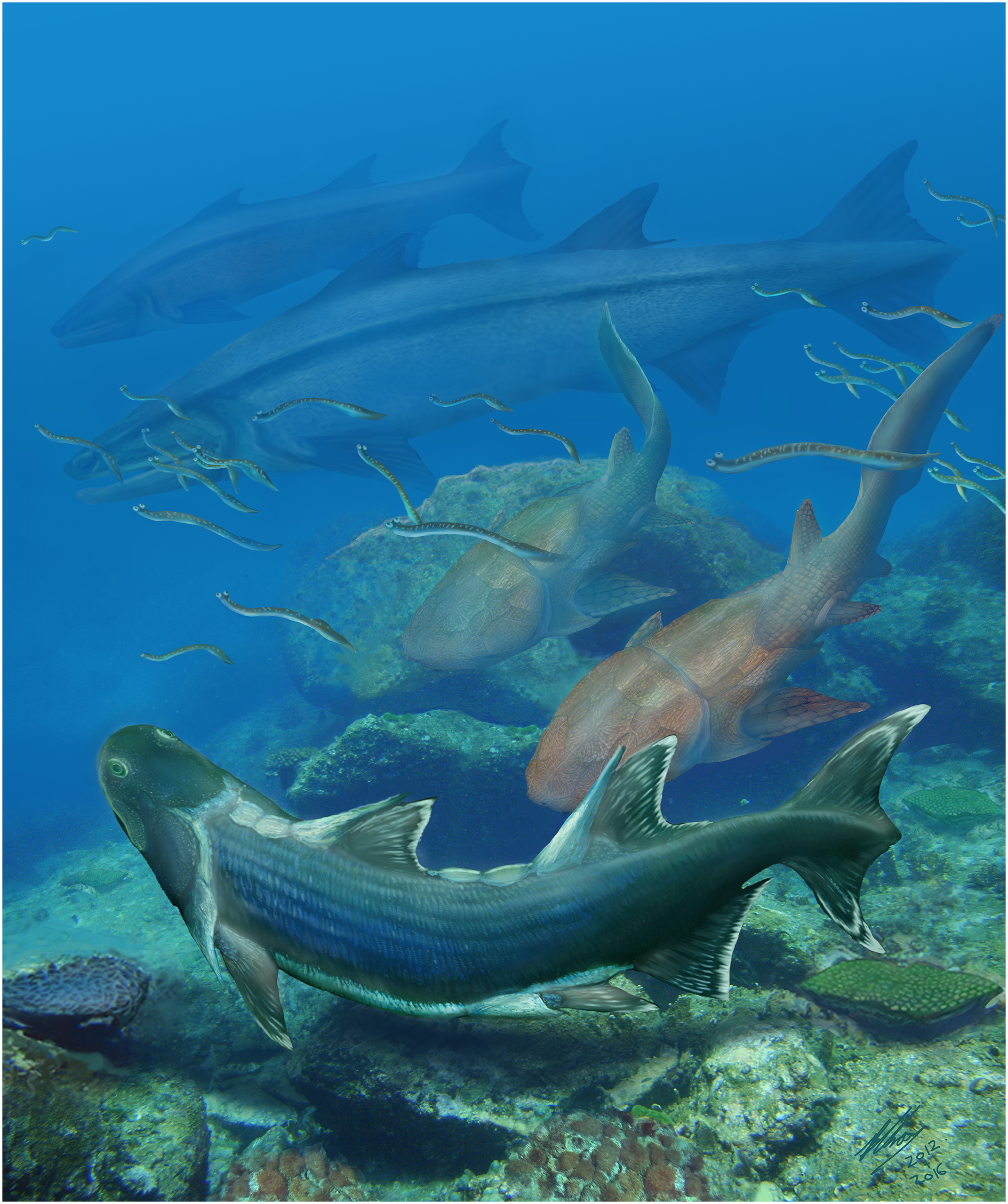
Life restoration of Sparalepis tingi (foreground) with other fauna from the Kuanti Formation.

It had large median dorsal plates with those immediately towards the front to each the two dorsal fins bearing a large spine. The scales and bony plates of Sparalepis are composed of glossy enamel ornamented with coarse sub-parallel ridges. The scales are also unusually tall, thick and narrow with some towards the front having an interlocking mechanism on both the outer and inner surfaces. There are large pore openings within the inter-ridge furrows on the appendicular girdles, gulars and median dorsal plates but absent on the scales.

== Phylogeny ==
Phylogenetic analysis show that it displays similarities to both Guiyu and Psarolepis placing it as a member of the Psarolepids. This has place Sparalepis as a sister genus to Psarolepis and Achoania with all three splitting from Guiyu. It can be distinguished from these other genera through several ways. First, the spine distinguishes Sparalepis from all other known osteichthyans except for Guiyu and Psarolepis. It can be further distinguished from Guiyu with its prominent linear ridges, pore openings on the dermal surfaces of all the large bones and ridge scutes and smaller size. These pores are also distinct from those of Psarolepis which have a porous cosmine-like surface.
