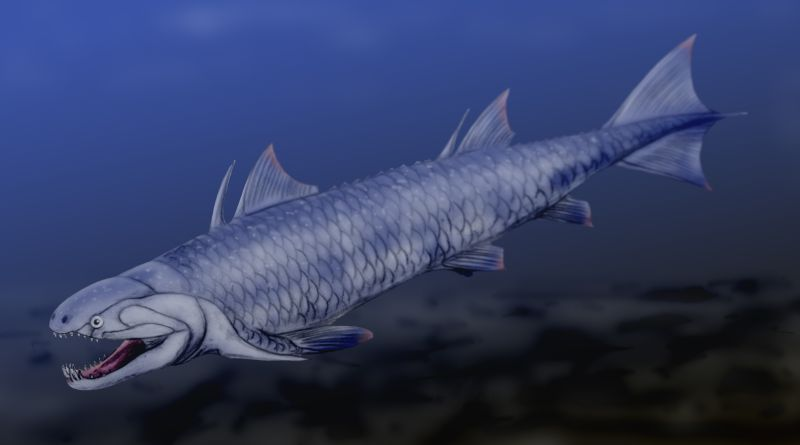
- Life reconstruction of Psarolepis romeri

Scientific classification
- Kingdom: Animalia
- Phylum: Chordata
- Clade: Osteichthyes
- Genus: †Psarolepis; Yu, 1998
- Species: †P. romeri

Binomial name
- †Psarolepis romeri Yu, 1998

= Psarolepis =

Psarolepis Temporal range: Devonian 418–397 Ma

Extinct genus of bony fishes

Psarolepis (/sæˈrɒlɪpɪs/; psārolepis, from Greek ψαρός 'speckled' and λεπίς 'scale') is an extinct monospecific genus of bony fish which lived from around 418 to 397 million years ago (Pridoli to Lochkovian stages). Fossils of Psarolepis have been found mainly in South China and described by paleontologist Xiaobo Yu in 1998. It is not known certainly in which group Psarolepis belongs, but paleontologists agree that it probably is a basal genus and seems to be close to the common ancestor of lobe-finned and ray-finned fishes. In 2001, paleontologist John A. Long compared Psarolepis with onychodontiform fishes and refer to their relationships.

== Description ==
Psarolepis had a pair of 'parasymphysical tooth whorls', teeth which extend up at the front of the lower jaw. The head was made of several thick dermal plates and covered with deep pock-marks and large pores. Another trait is a large pectoral spine, just in front of the pectoral fin, extending back from the shoulder girdle, and a dorsal spine located in front of a median fin behind the head, which gives the fish a shark-like form.

The pock-marked head of Psarolepis was made of plates containing a layer of porcelain-like cosmine. Because the cosmine layer obscures the suture lines of the skull, it is difficult to study the exact bone structure. The snout was strangely humped and the nostrils were located above the eyes, which were just above the upper jaw.

The most spectacular findings were the fin spines. Two are known: one extending back from the shoulder girdle and another which is associated with the dorsal fin. These fin spines are found only in primitive jawed fishes and are apparently absent from the most primitive sharks, but present in abundance in more derived forms.

Psarolepis had teeth at the very front of the snout with large fangs on the tooth plate. Outstanding feature are the 'parasymphysical tooth whorls' which place the fish in the order of Onychodontida. The premaxilla and the dentary had large inner teeth and irregular array of tiny outer teeth.

== Discovery ==
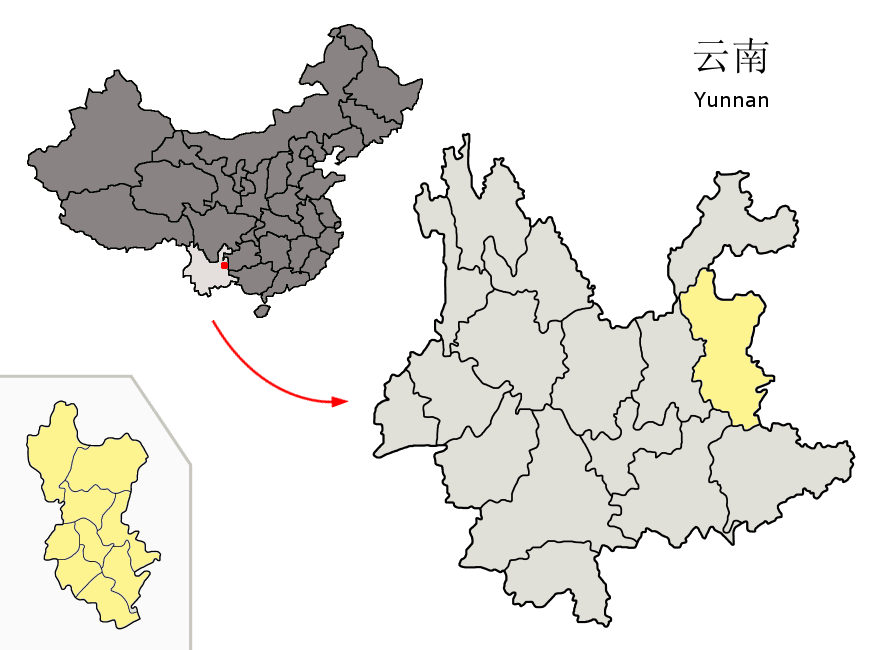
Location of Qujing Prefecture (yellow) within Yunnan province of China, where the fossils of Psarolepis were discovered.

Most of the fossils of Psarolepis were discovered at the same locality of the Yulongsi, Xishancun and Xitun Formations, about 10 kilometres (6.2 mi) northwest of the city of Qujing, Yunnan, China. With this discovery other prehistoric lobe-finned fishes came to light such as Youngolepis and Diabolepis. The remains of Psarolepis were collected in 1981 and 1984 by paleontologist Min Zhu and colleagues and dated from Early Devonian and Late Silurian periods. Other fossils, also dated from Late Silurian, have been found in Vietnam but the description of the fish was based on the materials from China because they were better preserved.

== History and classification ==
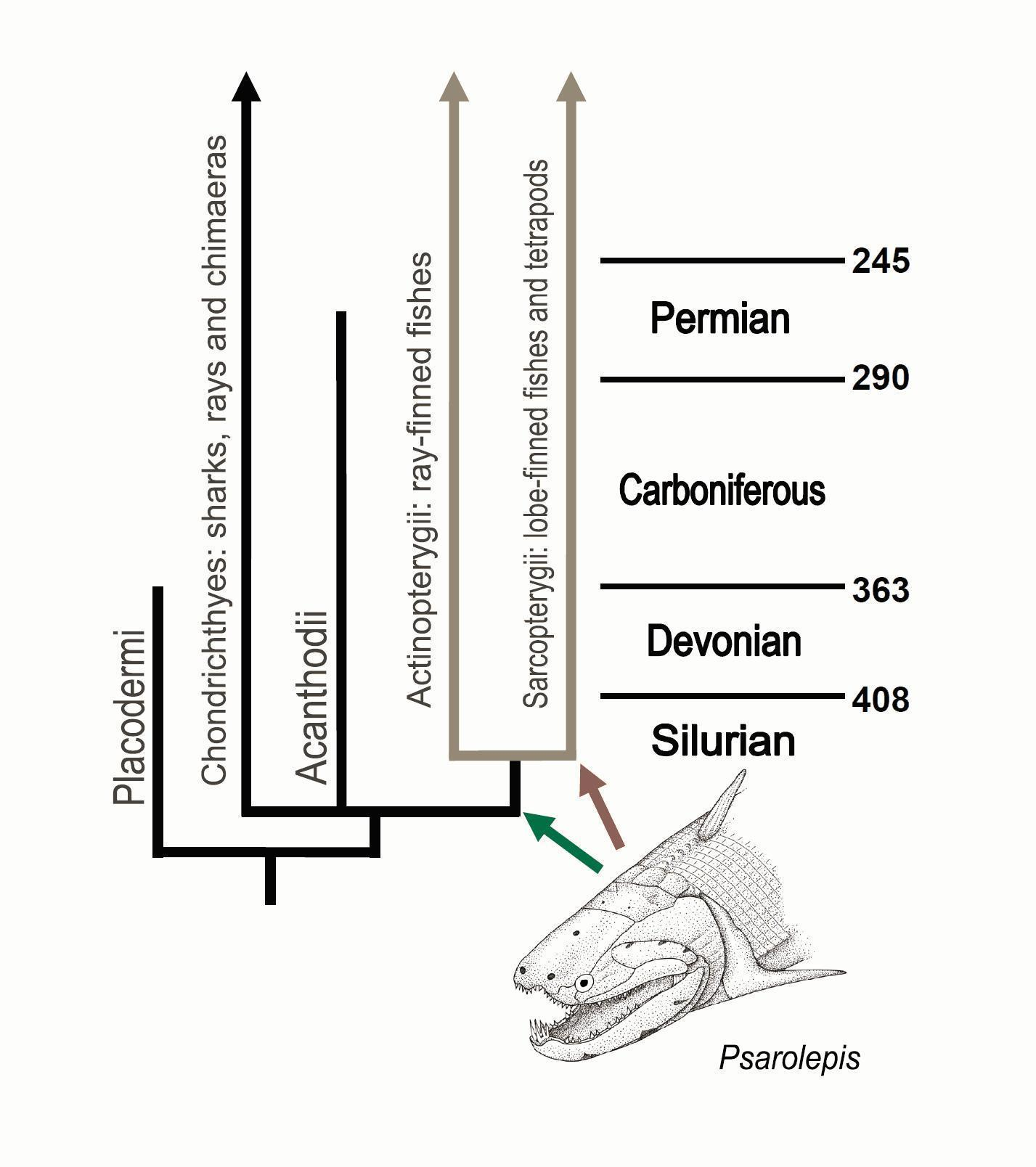
Fish relationships and the ambiguous position of Psarolepis. The red arrow shows Psarolepis as basal lobe-finned and the green arrow locates the fish as the basalmost bony fish.

When Psarolepis was described for the first time in 1998, it was placed in the group of sarcopterygians (lobe-finned fishes) because the skull and jaws resemble those of primitive lungfishes. In 1999 Zhu et al. were unable to locate Psarolepis in the cladogram because they did not know if it was the most primitive lobed-finned fish or the most primitive bony fish.

There are some characteristics that bony fish do not have, such as the median spine located behind the head, which is known in sharks and acanthodians, and the pectoral spine extending back from the shoulder girdle which is found in some placoderms and acanthodians. Later, in 2001, Zhu and Schultze gave more basis to the theory that Psarolepis was probably a basal bony fish.

The same year Long re-examined the phylogenetic position of the fish and pointed out several similarities between Psarolepis and Onychodontiform fishes. He also noted that the presence of a rotational tooth whorl combined with the other characteristics in the skull, and possibly in the shoulder girdle, show that Psarolepis is better placed as a sister taxon to Onychodus as the most basal member of the group of Onychodontiforms. Moreover, Long, referring to new fossils collected from Gogo Formation, Western Australia, said that Psarolepis and Onychodus are both basal bony fish and are more primitive than other lobe-finned groups.
