= Dialipina =

Dialipina Temporal range: Lochkovian to Emsian

Scientific classification
- Kingdom: Animalia
- Phylum: Chordata
- Clade: Osteichthyes
- Order: †Dialipiniformes; Nelson, Grande & Wilson, 2016
- Family: †Dialipinidae; Schultze, Arratia & Shen, 2026
- Genus: †Dialipina; Schultze, 1968

Type species
- †Dialipina salgueiroensis Schultze, 1968

Species
- †D. markae Schultze, 1992; †D. salgueiroensis Schultze, 1968

Extinct genus of bony fishes

Dialipina is an extinct genus of prehistoric marine bony fish from the Early Devonian. It is the only member of the order Dialipiniformes and the family Dialipinidae. It contains two species, both known from the high Arctic of Asia and North America. It was initially thought to be and sometimes still is treated as an early, basal actinopterygian, but recent phylogenetic analyses suggest that it may instead be a stem-osteichthyan.

The following species are known:

- †D. markae Schultze, 1992 - Lochkovian of Kotelny Island, Russia
- †D. salgueiroensis Schultze, 1968 (type species) - Emsian of the Northwest Territories, Canada (Bear Rock Formation)

The early Devonian stem-gnathostome Janusiscus was described from remains from the Siberian mainland that were previously attributed to D. markae.

D. salgueiroensis was initially described in 1968 by Hans-Peter Schultze from isolated scales identified from the Canadian Arctic, and initially interpreted as a paleoniscoid ray-finned fish. Later studies in the same region identified more specimems, including some complete skeletons, allowing for a much better understanding of its anatomy. Based on analyses of complete specimens, Dialipina was different from any other known bony fish, having two dorsal fins and a three-lobed (triphycercal) caudal fin, and appeared to not belong to either ray-finned or lobe-finned fish. In 2026, several authors, including Schultze, would re-analyze the anatomy of Dialipina and taxonomically revise it.

== See also ==
- Prehistoric fish
- List of prehistoric bony fish
