= Alfred Romer =

American paleontologist

Alfred Romer ForMemRS
- Alfred Romer in 1965
- Born: Alfred Sherwood Romer; December 28, 1894; White Plains, New York
- Died: November 5, 1973 (age 78); Cambridge, Massachusetts
- Education: Amherst College; Columbia University
- Awards: Mary Clark Thompson Medal (1954); Daniel Giraud Elliot Medal (1956); Hayden Memorial Geological Award (1962); Penrose Medal (1962); Paleontological Society Medal (1966); Linnean Medal (1972); Wollaston Medal (1973)
- Scientific career
- Fields: Paleontology
- Workplaces: Museum of Comparative Zoology
- Thesis: The Locomotor Apparatus of Certain Primitive and Mammal-like Reptiles (1922)
- Doctoral advisor: William King Gregory
- Author abbrev. (zoology): Romer

Alfred Sherwood Romer (December 28, 1894 – November 5, 1973) was an American paleontologist and biologist and a specialist in vertebrate evolution.

== Biography ==
Alfred Romer was born in White Plains, New York, the son of Harry Houston Romer and his wife, Evalyn Sherwood. He was educated at White Plains High School.

He studied at Amherst College for his Bachelor of Science Honours degree in biology, then at Columbia University for an M.Sc. in biology and a doctorate in zoology in 1921. Romer joined the department of geology and paleontology at the University of Chicago as an associate professor in 1923. He was an active researcher and teacher. His collecting program added important Paleozoic specimens to Chicago's Walker Museum of Paleontology. In 1934 he was appointed professor of biology at Harvard University. In 1946, he became director of the Harvard Museum of Comparative Zoology (MCZ). Romer was elected to the American Academy of Arts and Sciences in 1937. In 1951, he was elected to the American Philosophical Society. In 1954 Romer was awarded the Mary Clark Thompson Medal from the National Academy of Sciences, of which he was a member. He was awarded the academy's Daniel Giraud Elliot Medal in 1956. In 1961, Romer received the Golden Plate Award of the American Academy of Achievement.

== Evolutionary research ==
Romer was a keen practical student of vertebrate evolution. Comparing facts from paleontology, comparative anatomy, and embryology, he taught the basic structural and functional changes that happened during the evolution of fishes to ancestral terrestrial vertebrates and from these to all other tetrapods. He always emphasized the evolutionary significance of the relationship between form and function of animals and their environment.

Through his textbook Vertebrate Paleontology, Romer laid the foundation for the traditional classification of vertebrates. He drew together the then widely scattered taxonomy of the different vertebrate groups and combined them into a single scheme, emphasizing orderliness and overview. Based on his research into early amphibians, he reorganised the labyrinthodontians. Romer's classification has been followed by many subsequent authors, notably Robert L. Carroll, and is still in use.

== Namesakes ==
=== Taxonomic patronyms ===
In honor of Alfred Romer, several taxonomic patronyms were given in animals:

- Romeriida is the name for a clade that contains the diapsids and their closest relatives.
- Romeria is a genus of early captorhinids.
- Romeriscus is a genus from the early Pennsylvanian (Late Carboniferous) initially described as the oldest known amniote, but this is because limnoscelids were, at that time, considered amniotes by some authors. A subsequent study showed that the fossil lacks diagnostic characters and can only be assigned to Tetrapoda.
- Romerodus is a genus of eugeneodont fish.
- Dromomeron romeri is a species of non-dinosaurian dinosauromorph named in July 2007. The genus name means 'running femur,' and the species name honors the paleontologist, a key figure in evolution research. The finding of these fossils was hailed as a breakthrough proving dinosaurs and other dinosauromorphs "lived together for as long as 15 to 20 million years."

=== Romer's gap ===
Romer was the first to recognise the gap in the fossil record between the tetrapods of the Devonian and the later Carboniferous period, a gap that has borne the name Romer's gap since 1995.

=== Romerogram ===
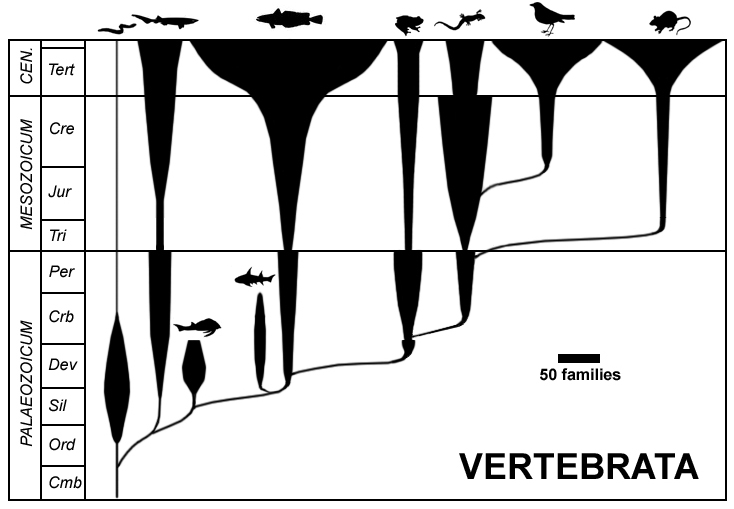
A romerogram of the vertebrates at class level, with the width of spindles indicating number of families.

A romerogram, also called spindle diagram, or bubble diagram, is a diagram popularised by Alfred Romer. It represents taxonomic diversity (horizontal width) against geological time (vertical axis) in order to reflect the variation of abundance of various taxa through time.

== Books ==
- Romer, A.S. 1933. Vertebrate Paleontology. University of Chicago Press, Chicago. (2nd ed. 1945; 3rd ed. 1966)
- Romer, A.S. 1933. Man and the Vertebrates. University of Chicago Press, Chicago. (2nd ed. 1937; 3rd ed. 1941; 4th ed., retitled The Vertebrate Story, 1949)
- Romer, A.S. 1949. The Vertebrate Body. W.B. Saunders, Philadelphia. (2nd ed. 1955; 3rd ed. 1962; 4th ed. 1970)
- Romer, A.S. 1949. The Vertebrate Story. University of Chicago Press, Chicago. (4th ed. of Man and the Vertebrates)
- Romer, A.S. 1956. Osteology of the Reptiles. University of Chicago Press, Chicago.
- Romer, A.S. 1968. Notes and Comments on Vertebrate Paleontology. University of Chicago Press, Chicago.
- Romer, A.S. & T.S. Parsons. 1977. The Vertebrate Body. 5th ed. Saunders, Philadelphia. (6th ed. 1985)
