= Diabolepis =

Diabolepis Temporal range: Lochkovian

Scientific classification
- Kingdom: Animalia
- Phylum: Chordata
- Class: Dipnoi
- Order: †Diabolepidiformes
- Family: †Diabolepididae; Schultze, 1993 (name only)
- Genus: †Diabolepis; Chang & Yu, 1987
- Species: †D. speratus

Binomial name
- †Diabolepis speratus (Chang & Yu, 1984)

Synonyms
- †Diabolichthys Chang & Yu, 1984 (preoccupied)

Extinct genus of fishes

Diabolepis is an extinct genus of very primitive marine lungfish which lived during the Early Devonian period. It contains a single species, D. speratus of Yunnan, China, from the mid-late Lochkovian of the Xitun Formation. It is one of the oldest known lungfish genera. It is the only member of the family Diabolepididae and the order Diabolepidiformes, although neither of these parent taxa have been officially described, despite their names being in scientific usage.

== Taxonomy ==
Diabolepis was originally described as Diabolichthys, but this name was found to be preoccupied by a now-outdated genus name given to the manta ray in the 19th century, thus necessitating a new genus name.

It is generally considered the most basal known dipnoan, although some other studies instead find Youngolepis to be more basal. In addition, some studies do not find it to be a lungfish, but rather a more basal dipnotetrapodomorph. However, other studies have continued to recover it as an early lungfish.

== Characteristics ==
A rather small fish, the fossil has risen to prominence as it has four nares like most fish, while modern lungfish have only two, the hindmost pair having moved on to the palate serving as choanae. This proved that the internal nares of lungfish had evolved independently of those in tetrapods. This has made the internal nares a case of parallel evolution rather than a homology between lungfish and tetrapods.

Diabolepis has a prominent snout; the more recurvature the snout, the greater is the proportion of the premaxilla that is included within the mouth cavity. The teeth within the premaxilla are folded with polyplocodont structure. The maxilla was either toothless or absent or there may have been a gap between the premaxilla and the maxilla. There is an intracranial joint or ventral fissure, two external nostrils, and separate ectopterygoids. One or several bones lie lateral to the anterior end of the postparietals. The skull roof has an incipient "B" bone between the postparietals. The rest of the skull roof has a tendency towards fragmentation into small bones. The endocranium is divided. The anterior nostril lies at the mouth margin. There can only be a narrow space between nostril and mouth, and an interrupted canal has been scored for Diabolepis.
