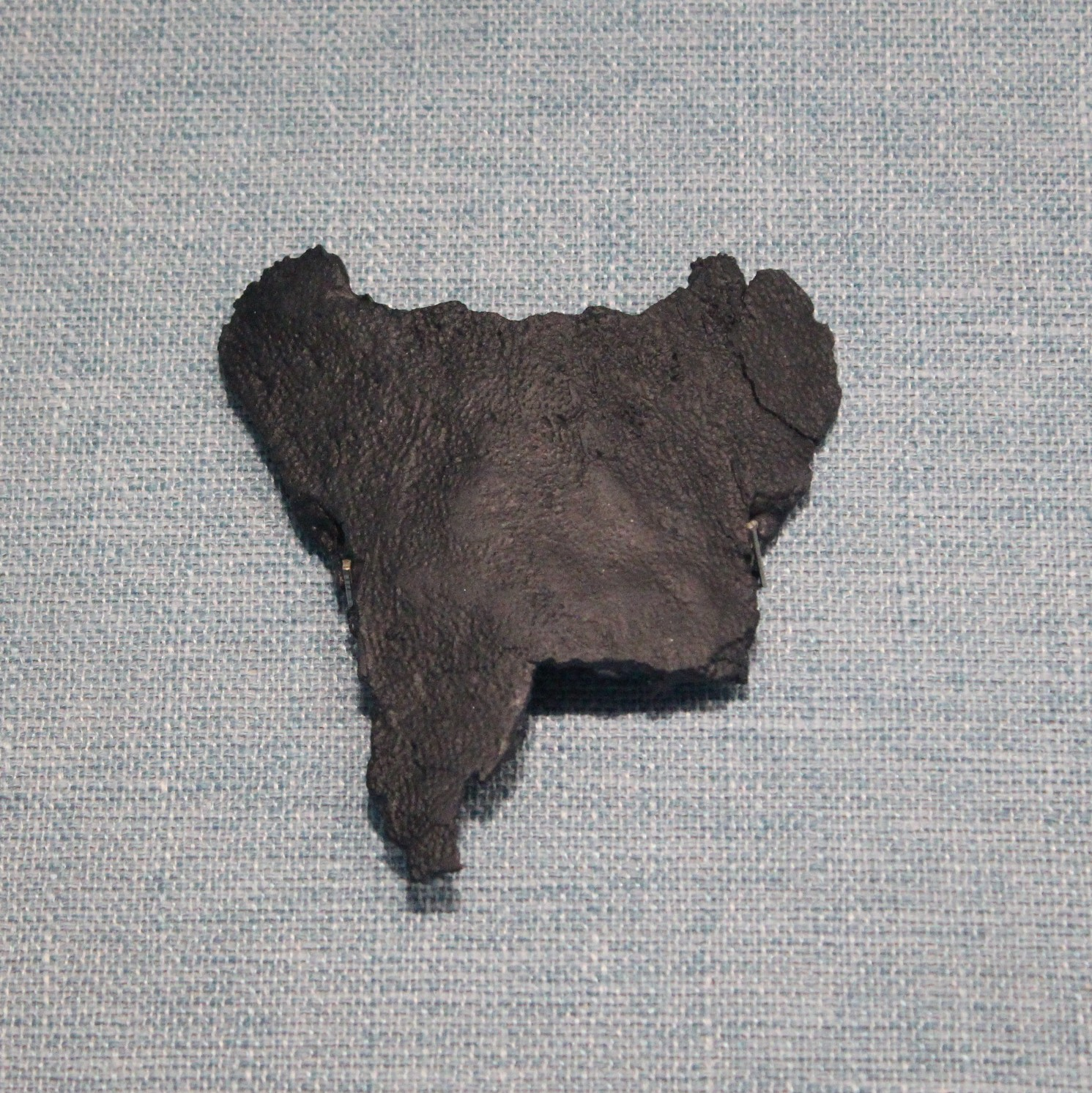
- Fossil cast at the Baoding Natural History Museum

Scientific classification
- Kingdom: Animalia
- Phylum: Chordata
- Class: Actinopterygii
- Genus: †Meemannia
- Species: †M. eos

Binomial name
- †Meemannia eos Zhu, Yu, Wang, Zhao & Jia, 2006

= Meemannia =

Meemannia Temporal range: Devonian

Extinct genus of fishes

Meemannia is a genus of extinct bony fish from the early Devonian period. It was initially classified as a lobe-finned fish; however, a restudy conducted by Lu et al. (2016) indicates that it was actually an early-diverging ray-finned fish. It was found in Yunnan, China. As preserved, it consists mainly of skull roofing bones and a partial otic region of the braincase. Its anatomy is unique in a number of features that resemble ray-finned fishes (Actinopterygii), and more generalized jawed vertebrates.

It was described in the May 4, 2006 edition of Nature, and named after Meemann Chang.
