= Cosmine =

Material in the scales of lobe-finned fishes

Cosmine is a spongy, bony material that makes up the dentine-like layers in the scales of the lobe-finned fishes of the class Sarcopterygii. Fish scales that include layers of cosmine are known as cosmoid scales.

== Description ==
As traditionally described, cosmine consists of a layer of dentine covered by a continuous sheet of enamel. Pulp cavities, which secrete dentine tubules, are surrounded by a complex polygonal network of 'pore cavities' which pierce the overlying enamel layer, giving cosmine its characteristic dotted appearance. The pulp cavities and pore chambers are connected by a complex, reticulated pore canal network which continues into a layer of vascular bone beneath the dentine. The exact configuration of the pore canal network and shape of the pore chambers differs between various taxa, although the general organization into a single layer of enamel over dentine with pore canals with vascular bone underneath remains consistent, at least within the Sarcopterygii.

== History ==
Cosmine was first described in the Osteolepiform Megalichthys hibberti by Williamson in 1849, in a purely descriptive, pre-Darwinian, non-evolutionary framework. Goodrich expanded on Williamson's descriptions, hypothesizing a transition from a monoodontode scale (like a chondryicthian placoid scale) to a complex polyodontode scale through fusion of discrete units. Gross' 1956 monograph provided the most elaborate description of cosmoid tissues detailing differences between the shape and configuration of pore canals within different clades of lobe finned fishes. Further descriptions of cosmine growth and development were advanced by Tor Ørvig, dealing specifically with the pattern of squamation, or scale formation across the body of a fish. Ørvig rationalized the observed patterns of cosmine in the fossil record with putative losses of the tissue in coelacanths and extant lungfish proposing that coelacanths, for example, retained a juvenile scale morphology through pedomorphosis. Keith Thomson later analyzed specific growth structures on the cosmine sheet- 'blisters' or 'islands' where cosmine had broken down, and deduced an electroceptive function for the pore chambers. Comparisons with electroceptive organs in extant sarcopterygians, however, have contradicted Thomson's functional hypothesis.

== Phylogenetics ==
New fossils from China have altered current understanding of early fish evolution. Many of these fossils have been identified on the basis of histological characteristics, such as Meemannia eos, classified as an early diverging sarcopterygian on the basis of a pore canal system similar to cosmine. However, later studies on cranial characters have indicated that Meemannia is likely a basal actinopterygian. Newer imaging studies including synchrotron tomography show that pore canal systems in association with dentine occur outside the crown sarcopterygian clade, implying an older synapomorphy of Osteichthyes as opposed to a definitive sarcopterygian trait. The exact phylogenetic significance of cosmine (as classically described) remains unclear.

== See also ==
- Dentin
- Ganoine
