= Styloichthys =

Styloichthys Temporal range: Early Devonian, Lochkovian
- View of snout and orbit region of Styloichthys

Scientific classification
- Kingdom: Animalia
- Phylum: Chordata
- Class: Actinistia
- Order: Coelacanthiformes
- Genus: †Styloichthys; Zhu & Yu, 2001

Type species
- Styloichthys changae Zhu & Yu, 2001
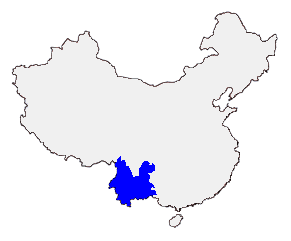
- Styloichthys range (in blue)

Extinct genus of fishes

Styloichthys (Greek: stylo "pillar" and ichthys "fish"; "Pillar fish") is a prehistoric sarcopterygian, lobe-finned fish which lived during the Early Devonian (Lochkovian) period of East Yunnan, South China.

Because it is clear that the jaws and skull of Styloichthys share many derived features with coelacanthiformes it is placed as the oldest coelacanth.

== Description ==
Styloichthys is characterized by large pores on the cosmine surface. These pores are often spoon-shaped and arranged in parallel grooves. There is a jagged margin between ethmosphenoid and otoccipital shields, an otoccipital with a wide flat surface carrying no vestibular fontanelle.

The snout bends sharply downward and is slightly concave. The lower jaw has a ventrally protruding flange formed by prearticular and meckelian bone.

Also characteristic of Styloichthys is the lyre-shaped trajectory of the supraorbital canal, a fenestra ventralis, small internasal cavities, three coronoids in the lower jaw, an eyestalk and a slender postorbital pila which connects the basipterygoid process and the side of the braincase wall.

== Anatomical characteristics ==
=== Orbit region ===
The feature exceptional of Styloichthys is the recessed teardrop-shaped eyestalk area behind the optic canal.

The well defined natural margin of this unfinished area is indicated by surrounding periosteal lining which dips slightly into the unfinished recess. This corresponds to the eyestalk attachment reported in basal bony fishes.

A small depression serves for eye muscle attachment ventral to the eyestalk area.

=== Lower Jaw ===
Indication of three semilunar pockets along a shallow groove between the dentary and the prearticular shows that the lower jaw has three coronoids. It is unique in that it has a very large adductor fossa, a convex ventral flange, and a prearticular of minute denticles dorsally and undulating parallel ridges ventrally.
