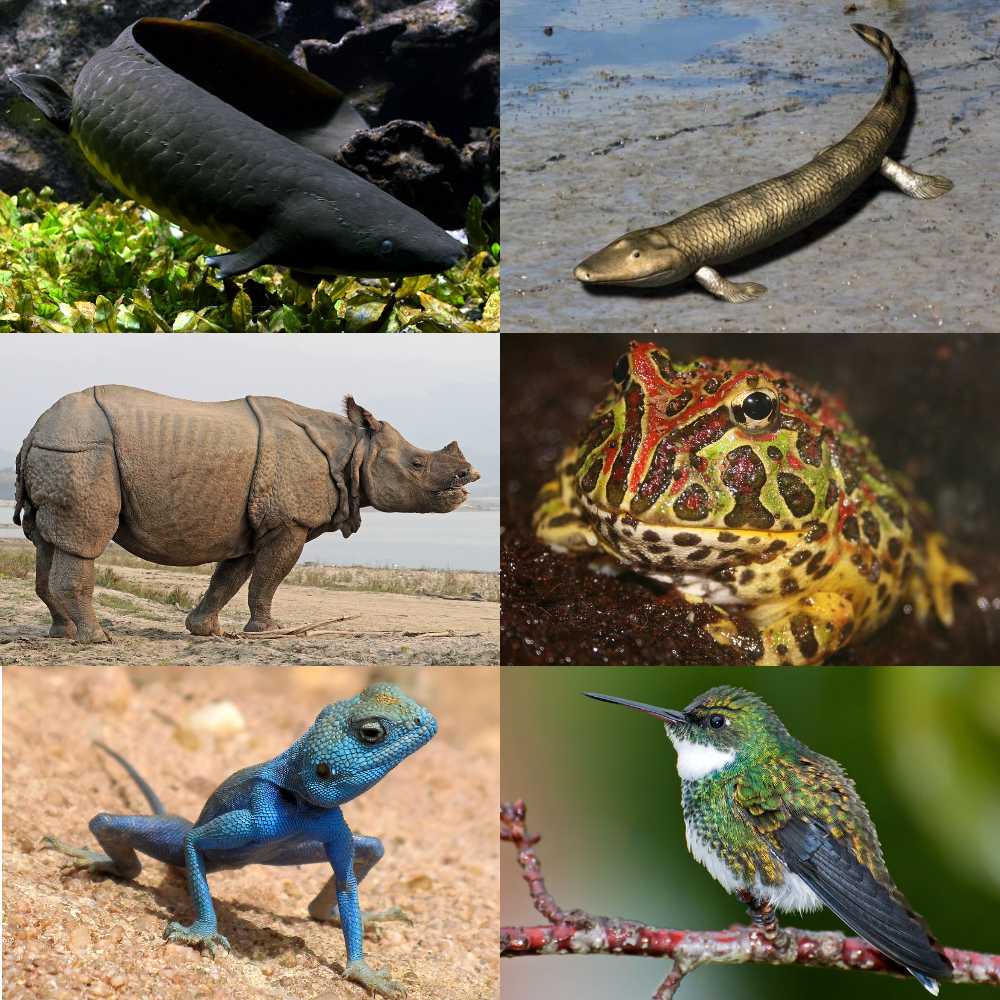
- Diversity of Rhipidistia

Scientific classification
- Kingdom: Animalia
- Phylum: Chordata
- Clade: Sarcopterygii
- Clade: Rhipidistia

Subgroups
- Dipnomorpha; †Porolepiformes; Dipnoi (lungfish); Tetrapodomorpha

= Rhipidistia =

Rhipidistians Temporal range: Early Devonian - Present, 416–0 Ma

Clade of vertebrates

Rhipidistia, also known as Dipnotetrapodomorpha, is a clade of lobe-finned fishes which includes the tetrapods and lungfishes. Rhipidistia formerly referred to a subgroup of Sarcopterygii consisting of the Porolepiformes and Osteolepiformes, a definition that is now obsolete. However, as cladistic understanding of the vertebrates has improved over the last few decades, a monophyletic Rhipidistia is now understood to include the whole of Tetrapoda and the lungfishes.

Rhipidistia includes Porolepiformes and Dipnoi. Extensive fossilization of lungfishes has contributed to many evolutionary studies of this group. Evolution of autostylic jaw suspension, in which the palatoquadrate bone fuses to the cranium, and the lymph pumping "lymph heart" (later lost in mammals and flying birds), are unique to this group. Another feature shared by lungfish and tetrapods is the divided atrium, though it evolved convergently.

The precise time at which the choana of tetrapods evolved is debated, with some considering early rhipidistians as the first choanates. The feature is also present in modern lungfish but is probably a case of convergent evolution. The basal stem-lungfish Diabolepis did not possess it. Instead, it had four nostrils (two anterior and two posterior) like most fish. However, its posterior nares are very close to the lip, meaning a ventral 'displacement' of the posterior nostril can be considered a synapomorphy of the lungfish-tetrapod clade. The complete choana then seems to have developed independently in the two surviving clades.

== Etymology ==
The word "Rhipidistia" is from Ancient Greek: ῥιπίδιον, romanized: rhipídion, lit. 'small bellows'.

The word "Dipnotetrapodomorpha" is from Greek: δίπνοος, romanized: dipnoos, lit. 'with two breathing structures' (from δι- meaning "twice", and πνοή meaning "breathing, breath"); from Ancient Greek: τετρα-, romanized: tetra-, lit. 'four', the combining form of the numeral τέτταρες (tettares); from Ancient Greek: -ποδ-, romanized: -pod-, the combining form of πούς (pous) meaning "foot"; and from Ancient Greek: -μορφος, romanized: -morphos, the combining form of μορφή (morph) meaning "physical shape".

== Phylogeny ==
The cladogram presented below is based on studies compiled by Philippe Janvier and others for the Tree of Life Web Project, and Swartz 2012.

- Sarcopterygii
  - †Onychodontidae
  - Actinistia (coelacanths)
  - Rhipidistia
    - †Styloichthys
    - Dipnomorpha
      - †Porolepiformes
      - Dipnoi (lungfishes)
    - Tetrapodomorpha
      - ?†Tungsenia
      - †Kenichthys
      - - †Rhizodontiformes
        - - ?†Thysanolepidae
          - †Canowindridae
          - - †Osteolepiformes
            - Eotetrapodiformes
              - †Tristichopteridae
              - - †Tinirau
                - - †Platycephalichthys
                  - Elpistostegalia
                    - †Panderichthys
                    - - †Elpistostegidae
                      - Stegocephalia
                        - †Elginerpetontidae
                        - - - †Metaxygnathus
                            - †Ventastega
                          - Tetrapoda
