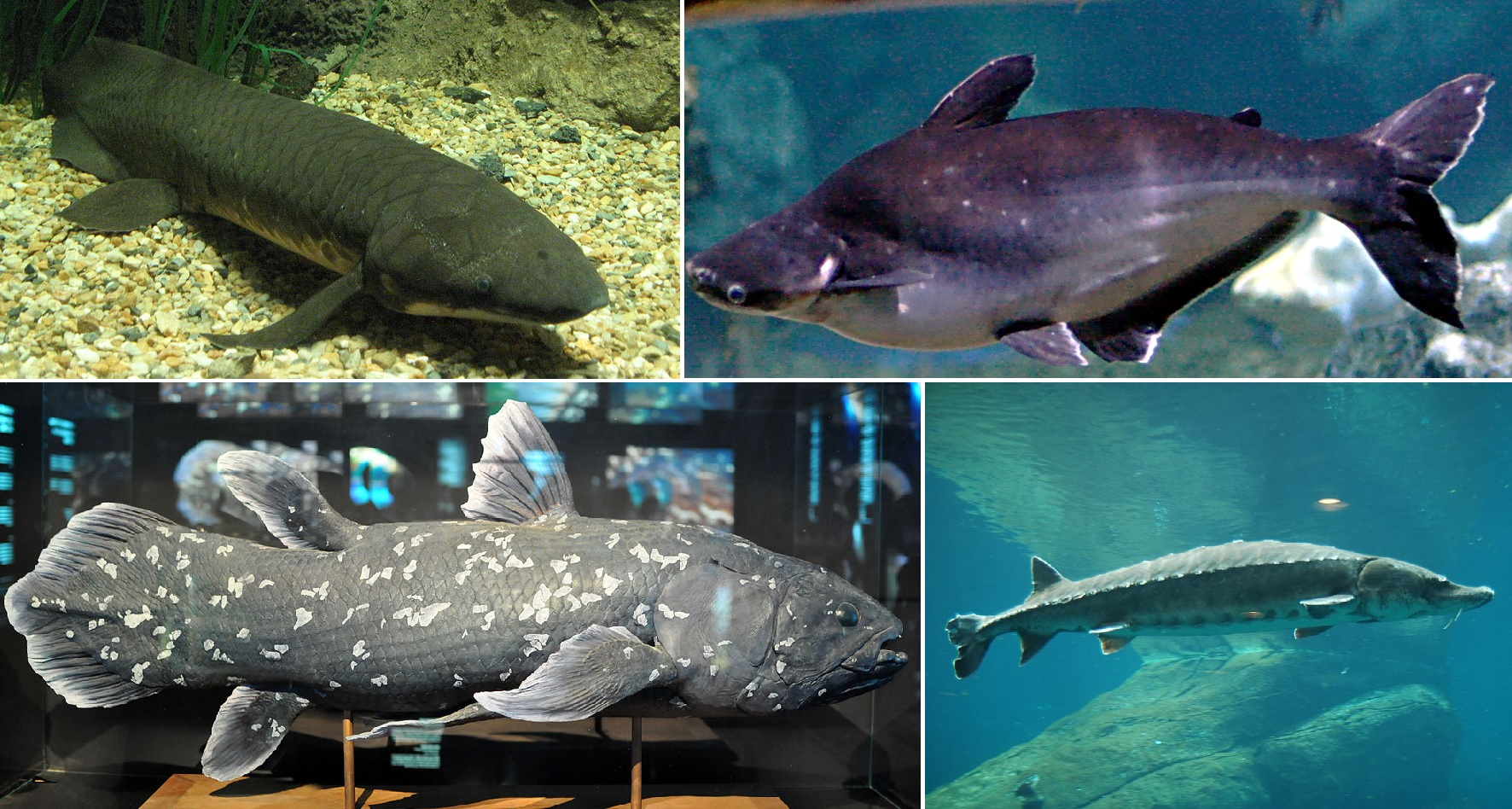
- Example of Osteichthyes: left: Queensland lungfish and West Indian Ocean coelacanth (two sarcopterygians), right: iridescent shark and American black sturgeon (two actinopterygians)

Scientific classification
- Kingdom: Animalia
- Phylum: Chordata
- Clade: Olfactores
- Subphylum: Vertebrata
- Infraphylum: Gnathostomata
- Clade: Eugnathostomata
- Clade: Osteichthyes; Huxley, 1880

Subgroups
- †Andreolepis; †Dialipina; †Eosteus; †Ligulalepis; †Lophosteus; †Megamastax; ?†"Psarolepids"; Guiyu; Sparalepis; Psarolepis; Achoania; Actinopterygii (ray-finned fish); Sarcopterygii (lobe-finned fish, including tetrapods)

Synonyms
- Euteleostomi

= Osteichthyes =

Osteichthyes Temporal range: Early Silurian–Present, 436–0 Ma

Diverse clade of vertebrate animals

Osteichthyes (/ˌɒstiːˈɪkθiːz/ ost-ee-IK-theez; from Ancient Greek ὀστέον (ostéon) 'bone' and ἰχθύς (ikhthús) 'fish'), also known as osteichthyans or commonly referred to as the bony fish, is a diverse clade of vertebrate animals that have endoskeletons primarily composed of bone tissue, encompassing both the conventional bony fishes and, in a cladistic sense, all tetrapods, including mammals and reptiles. They can be contrasted with the Chondrichthyes (cartilaginous fish) and the extinct placoderms and acanthodians, which have endoskeletons primarily composed of cartilage. The vast majority of extant fish are members of Osteichthyes, being an extremely diverse and abundant group consisting of 45 orders, over 435 families and 28,000 species.

The group is divided into two main clades, the ray-finned fish (Actinopterygii, which makes up the vast majority of extant fish) and the lobe-finned fish (Sarcopterygii, which gave rise to all land vertebrates). The oldest known fossils of bony fish are about 436 million years old from the early Silurian period, which are also transitional fossils showing a tooth pattern that is in between the tooth rows of sharks and true bony fishes. Despite the name, these early basal bony fish had not yet evolved ossification and their skeletons were still mostly cartilaginous, and the main distinguishing feature that set them apart from other fish clades were the development of foregut pouches that eventually evolved into the swim bladders and lungs, respectively.

Osteichthyes is broadly equivalent to Euteleostomi. In paleontology the terms are synonymous. In ichthyology the difference is that Euteleostomi presents a cladistic view which includes the terrestrial tetrapods that evolved from lobe-finned fish. Until recently, the view of most ichthyologists has been that Osteichthyes were paraphyletic and include only fishes. However, since 2013 widely cited ichthyology papers have been published with phylogenetic trees that treat the Osteichthyes as a clade including tetrapods.

== Characteristics ==
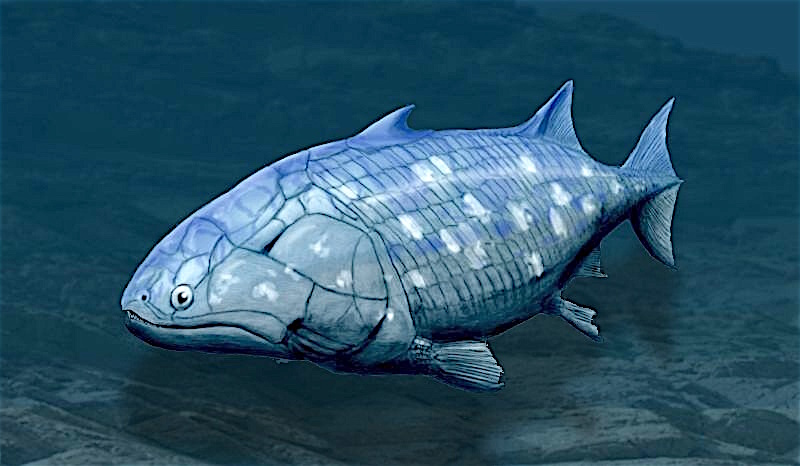
Guiyu oneiros, one of the earliest known bony fish, lived during the Late Silurian, 425 million years ago.

Bony fish are characterized by a relatively stable pattern of cranial bones, rooted, medial insertion of mandibular muscle in the lower jaw. The head and pectoral girdles are covered with large dermal bones. The eyeball is supported by a scleral ring of four small bones, but this characteristic has been lost or modified in many modern species. The labyrinth in the inner ear contains large otoliths. The braincase, or neurocranium, is frequently divided into anterior and posterior sections divided by a fissure.

Early bony fish had simple respiratory diverticula (an outpouching on either side of the esophagus) which helped them breathe air in low-oxygen water as a form of supplementary enteral respiration. In ray-finned fish these have evolved into swim bladders, the changing sizes of which help to alter the body's specific density and buoyancy. In elpistostegalians, a crown group of lobe-finned fish that gave rise to the land-dwelling tetrapods, these respiratory diverticula became further specialized for obligated air breathing and evolved into the modern amphibian, reptilian, avian and mammalian lungs. Early bony fish did not have fin spines like most modern fish, but instead had the fleshy paddle-like fins similar to other non-bony clades of fish, although the lobe-finned fish evolved articulated appendicular skeletons within their paired fins, which gave rise to tetrapods' limbs. They also evolved a pair of opercula (gill covers), which can actively draw water across the gills so they can breathe without having to swim.

Bony fish do not have placoid scales like cartilaginous fish, but instead have scales that lie underneath the epidermis and do not penetrate it. The three categories of scales in Osteichthyes are cosmoid scales, ganoid scales, and teleost scales. Teleost scales are then divided into two subgroups which are cycloid scales and ctenoid scales. All of these scales have a base of bone that they all originate from; the main difference is that teleost scales have only one layer of bone. Ganoid scales have lamellar bone, and vascular bone that lies on top of the lamellar bone, then enamel that lies on top of both layers of bone. Cosmoid scales have the same two layers of bone that ganoid scales have except that they have dentin in between the enamel and vascular bone.

== Classification ==
...it is increasingly widely accepted that tetrapods, including ourselves, are simply modified bony fishes, and so we are comfortable with using the taxon Osteichthyes as a clade, which now includes all tetrapods...

— Fishes of the World (5th ed)

Traditionally, Osteichthyes was considered a class, recognised on the presence of a swim bladder, only three pairs of gill arches hidden behind a bony operculum, and a predominantly bony skeleton. Under this classification system, Osteichthyes was considered paraphyletic with regard to land vertebrates, as the common ancestor of all osteichthyans includes tetrapods amongst its descendants. While the largest subclass, Actinopterygii (ray-finned fish), is monophyletic, with the inclusion of the smaller subclass Sarcopterygii, Osteichthyes was regarded as paraphyletic.

This has given way to the current cladistic classification which splits the Osteichthyes into several clades. Under this scheme Osteichthyes is monophyletic, as it includes the tetrapods making it a synonym of the clade Euteleostomi. Most bony fish belong to the ray-finned fish (Actinopterygii).

In ichthyology the difference between Euteleostomi and Osteichthyes is that the former presents a cladistic view, i.e. that the terrestrial tetrapods evolved from lobe-finned fish (Sarcopterygii). Until recently, the view of most ichthyologists has been that Osteichthyes were paraphyletic and include only bony fishes. However, since 2013 widely cited ichthyology papers have been published with phylogenetic trees that treat the Osteichthyes as a clade including tetrapods, making the terms Euteleostomi and Osteichthyes synonymous.

Clade	Example	Description
Actinopterygii	ray-finned fish	Actinopterygii, members of which are known as ray-finned fishes, is a class of the bony fishes. The ray-finned fishes are so called because they possess lepidotrichia or "fin rays", their fins being webs of skin supported by bony or horny spines ("rays"), as opposed to the fleshy, lobed fins that characterize the clade Sarcopterygii which also possess lepidotrichia. These actinopterygian fin rays attach directly to the proximal or basal skeletal elements, the radials, which represent the link or connection between these fins and the internal skeleton (e.g., pelvic and pectoral girdles). In terms of numbers, actinopterygians are the dominant class of vertebrates, comprising nearly 99% of the over 30,000 species of fish (Davis, Brian 2010). They are ubiquitous throughout freshwater and marine environments from the deep sea to the highest mountain streams. Extant species can range in size from Paedocypris, at 8 mm (0.3 in), to the massive giant sunfish, at 2,700 kg (6,000 lb), and the long-bodied giant oarfish, at up to 8 m (26 ft) (or possibly 11 m (36 ft)).
Sarcopterygii	lobe-finned fish and tetrapods	Sarcopterygii (fleshy fin), members of which are known as lobe-finned fish, is an unranked clade of the bony fishes. Traditionally, it is a class or subclass that excludes Tetrapoda, a group of typically terrestrial vertebrates that descends from lobe-finned fish. However, under modern cladistic classification schemes, Sarcopterygii is a clade that includes the tetrapods. The living sarcopterygians are the coelacanths, lungfish, and tetrapods. Early lobe-finned fishes had fleshy, lobed, paired fins, joined to the body by a single bone. Their fins differ from those of all other fish in that each is borne on a fleshy, lobelike, scaly stalk extending from the body. Pectoral and pelvic fins have articulations resembling those of tetrapod limbs. These fins evolved into legs of the first tetrapod land vertebrates, amphibians. They also possess two dorsal fins with separate bases, as opposed to the single dorsal fin of actinopterygians (ray-finned fish). The braincase of sarcoptergygians primitively has a hinge line, but this is lost in tetrapods and lungfish. Many early lobe-finned fishes have a symmetrical tail. All lobe-finned fishes possess teeth covered with true enamel.

== Phylogeny ==
A phylogeny of living Osteichthyes, including the tetrapods, is shown in the cladogram below. Whole-genome duplication took place in the ancestral Osteichthyes.

- Osteichthyes/ Euteleostomi
  - Sarcopterygii (lobe‑fins)
    - Actinistia
      Coelacanthiformes
    - Rhipidistia
      - Dipnoi
        Ceratodontiformes
      - Tetrapodomorpha
        Tetrapoda
  - Actinopterygii (ray‑fins)
    - Cladistia
      Polypteriformes
    - Actinopteri
      - Chondrostei
        Acipenseriformes
      - Neopterygii
        - Holostei
          - Ginglymodi
            Lepisosteiformes
          - Halecomorphi
            Amiiformes
        - Teleostei
          - Elopomorpha
            - Elopiformes
            - - Albuliformes
              - - Notacanthiformes
                - Anguilliformes
          - Osteoglossocephalai
            - Osteoglossomorpha
              - Osteoglossiformes
              - Hiodontiformes
            - Clupeocephala
              - Otomorpha
                - Otocephala
                  Clupeiformes
                - - Alepocephali
                    Alepocephaliformes
                  - Ostariophysi
                    - Anotophysa
                      Gonorynchiformes
                    - Otophysa
                      - Cypriniformes
                      - - Characiformes
                        - - Gymnotiformes
                          - Siluriformes
              - Euteleosteomorpha
                - Lepidogalaxiiformes
                - - - Protacanthopterygii
                      - Argentiniformes
                      - - Galaxiiformes
                        - - Salmoniformes
                          - Esociformes
                  - - Stomiatii
                      - Osmeriformes
                      - Stomiatiformes
                    - Neoteleostei

== Biology ==
All bony fish possess gills. For the majority this is their sole or main means of respiration. Lungfish and other osteichthyan species are capable of respiration through lungs or vascularized swim bladders. Other species can respire through their skin, intestines, and/or stomach.

Osteichthyes are primitively ectothermic (cold blooded), meaning that their body temperature is dependent on that of the water. But some of the larger marine osteichthyids, such as the opah, swordfish and tuna have independently evolved various levels of endothermy. Bony fish can be any type of heterotroph: numerous species of omnivore, carnivore, herbivore, filter-feeder, detritivore, or hematophage are documented.

Some bony fish are hermaphrodites, and a number of species exhibit parthenogenesis. Fertilization is usually external, but can be internal. Development is usually oviparous (egg-laying) but can be ovoviviparous, or viviparous. Although there is usually no parental care after birth, before birth parents may scatter, hide, guard or brood eggs, with sea horses being notable in that the males undergo a form of "pregnancy", brooding eggs deposited in a ventral pouch by a female.

== Examples ==
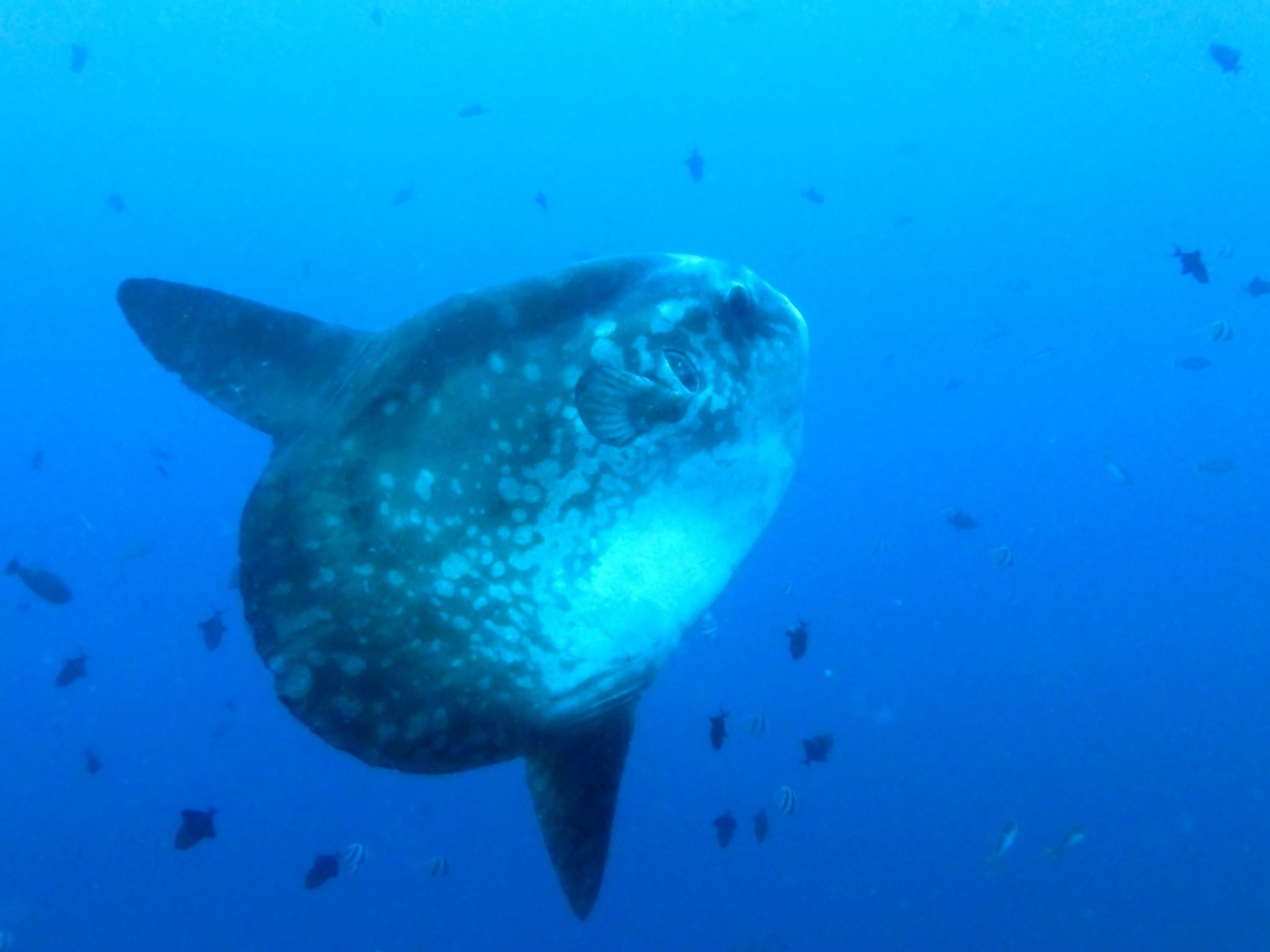
The giant sunfish is the heaviest non-tetrapod bony fish in the world.

The giant sunfish is the heaviest non-tetrapod bony fish in the world. In late 2021, Portuguese fishermen found a dead sunfish near the coast of Faial Island, Azores. At 2,744 kilograms (6,049 lb) in weight, 3.6 metres (12 ft) in height, and 3.5 metres (11 ft) in length, it was the biggest giant sunfish ever captured.

The longest is the king of herrings, a type of oarfish. Other very large bony fish include the Atlantic blue marlin, some specimens of which have been recorded as in excess of 820 kilograms (1,810 lb), the black marlin, some sturgeon species, and the giant and goliath grouper, both of which can exceed 300 kilograms (660 lb) in weight. In contrast, Paedocypris progenetica and the stout infantfish can measure less than 8 millimetres (0.31 in). The beluga sturgeon is the largest species of freshwater bony fish extant today, and Arapaima gigas is among the largest of the freshwater fish. The largest non-tetrapod bony fish ever was Leedsichthys, which dwarfed the beluga sturgeon as well as the ocean sunfish, giant grouper and all the other extant non-tetrapod bony fishes.

== Comparison with cartilaginous fishes ==
Comparison of cartilaginous and bony fishes
Characteristic	Sharks (cartilaginous)	Bony fishes
Habitat	Mainly marine	Marine, freshwater and land (most tetrapods)
Shape	Usually dorso-ventrally flattened	Usually bilaterally flattened
Exoskeleton	Separate dermal placoid scales	Overlapping dermal cosmoid, ganoid, cycloid or ctenoid scales
Endoskeleton	Cartilaginous	Mostly bony
Caudal fin	Heterocercal	Heterocercal or diphycercal
Pelvic fins	Usually posterior.	Mostly anterior, occasionally posterior.
Intromittent organ	Males use pelvic fins as claspers for transferring sperm to a female	Do not use claspers, though some species use their anal fins as gonopodium for the same purpose
Mouth	Large, crescent shaped on the ventral side of the head	Variable shape and size at the tip or terminal part of the head
Jaw suspension	Hyostylic	Hyostylic and autostylic
Gill openings	Usually five pairs of gill slits which are not protected by an operculum.	Five pairs of gill slits protected by an operculum (a lateral flap of skin).
Type of gills	Larnellibranch with long interbranchial septum	Filiform with reduced interbranchial septum
Spiracles	The first gill slit usually becomes spiracles opening behind the eyes.	No spiracles
Afferent branchial vessels	Five pairs from ventral aorta to gills	Only four pairs
Efferent branchial vessels	Nine pairs	Four pairs
Conus arteriosus	Present in heart	Absent
Cloaca	A true cloaca is present only in cartilaginous fishes and lobe-finned fishes.	In most bony fishes, the cloaca is absent, and the anus, urinary and genital apertures open separately
Stomach	Typically J-shaped	Shape variable. Absent in some.
Intestine	Short with spiral valve in lumen	Long with no spiral valve
Rectal gland	Present	Absent
Liver	Usually has two lobes	Usually has three lobes
Swim bladder	Absent	Usually present
Brain	Has large olfactory lobes and cerebrum with small optic lobes and cerebellum	Has small olfactory lobes and cerebrum and large optic lobes and cerebellum
Restiform bodies	Present in brain	Absent
Ductus endolymphaticus	Opens on top of head	Does not open to exterior
Retina	Lacks cones	Most fish have double cones, a pair of cone cells joined to each other.
Accommodation of eye	Accommodate for near vision by moving the lens closer to the retina	Accommodate for distance vision by moving the lens further from the retina
Ampullae of Lorenzini	Present	Absent
Male genital duct	Connects to the anterior part of the genital kidney	No connection to kidney
Oviducts	Not connected to ovaries	Connected to ovaries
Urinary and genital apertures	United and urinogenital apertures lead into common cloaca	Separate and open independently to exterior
Eggs	A small number of large eggs with plenty of yolk	A large number of small eggs with little yolk
Fertilisation	Internal	Usually external
Development	Ovoviviparous types develop internally. Oviparous types develop externally using egg cases	Normally develop externally without an egg case

== See also ==
- Ostracoderm - armoured jawless fish.
- Entelognathus
- Bianchengichthys
- Prehistoric fish

== Sources ==
- Helfman, G.S.; Facey, D.E. (1997). The Diversity of Fishes. Blackwell Sciences. ISBN 978-0-86542-256-8.
