= Achoania =

Achoania Temporal range: Early Devonian (Lochkovian)

Scientific classification
- Kingdom: Animalia
- Phylum: Chordata
- Clade: Osteichthyes
- Genus: †Achoania; Zhu, Yu & Ahlberg, 2001
- Species: †A. jarvikii

Binomial name
- †Achoania jarvikii Zhu, Yu & Ahlberg, 2001

Extinct genus of bony fishes

Achoania is an extinct genus of primitive marine bony fish which lived during the Early Devonian period. It is known from a skull discovered in the Xitun Formation of Yunnan, China. While originally considered to be a lobe-finned fish, later studies suggested that it may be a stem-group Osteichthyes instead.

The morphology of the eye socket suggests that Achoania had an eyestalk connecting each eye to its head. This feature is rarely seen in most early bony fish, although it is also present in Psarolepis.
