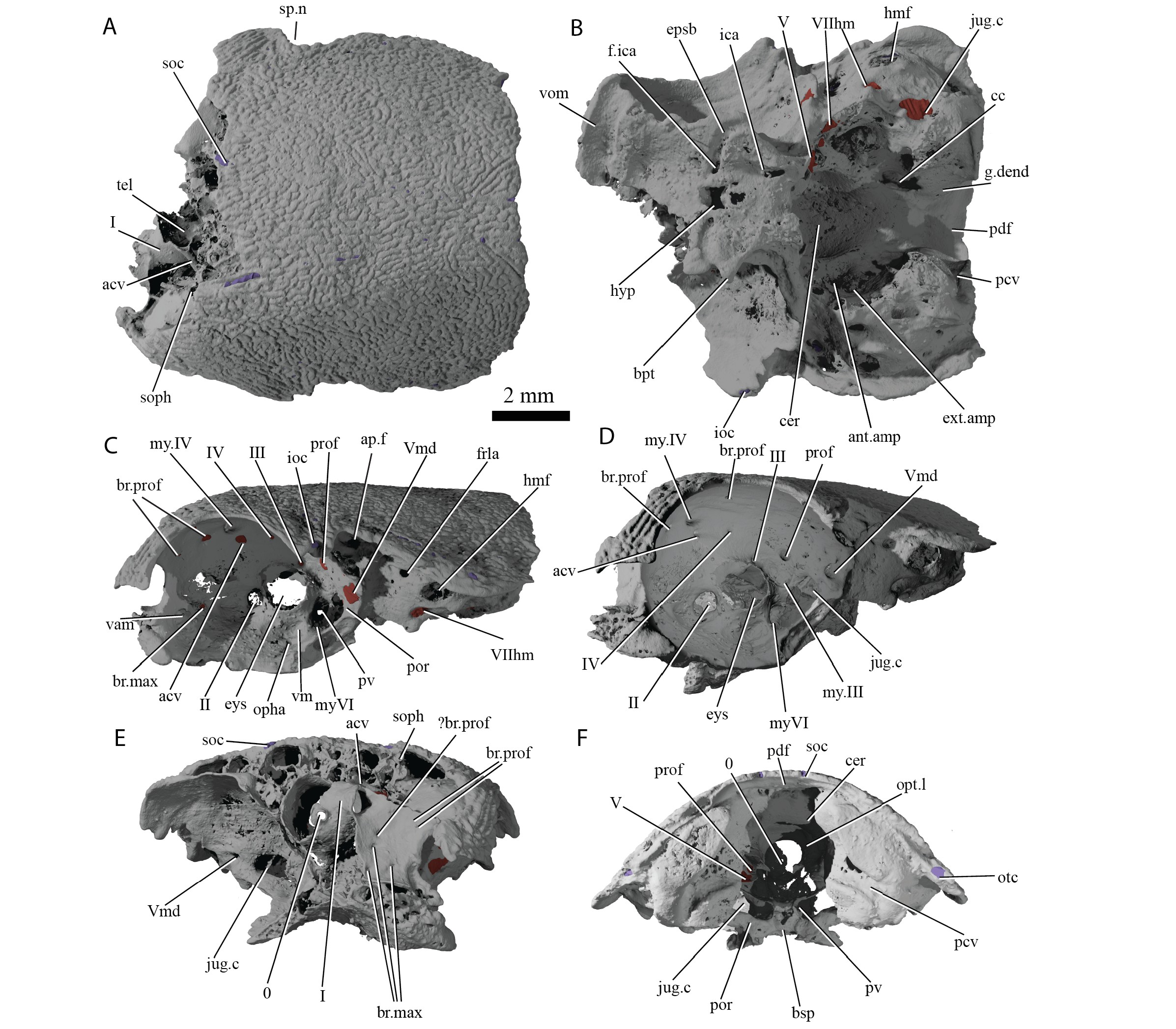
- Skull of Ligulalepis toombsi

Scientific classification
- Kingdom: Animalia
- Phylum: Chordata
- Clade: Osteichthyes
- Genus: †Ligulalepis; Schultze 1968

Type species
- †Ligulalepis toombsi Schultze 1968

Species
- †?L. sinensis Burrow, Turner & Wang 2009; †L. toombsi Schultze 1968; †L. yunnanensis Wang & Dong 1989

= Ligulalepis =

Ligulalepis Temporal range: Ludlow–Emsian

Extinct genus of osteichthyans

Ligulalepis is an extinct genus of stem-osteichthyans which lived from the Silurian to the Early Devonian.

The following species are known:

- †L. toombsi Schultze, 1968 - Early Devonian (Emsian) of New South Wales, Australia (Taemas Formation)
- †?L. sinensis Burrow, Turner & Wang, 2000 [scale] - Early Devonian of Sichuan, China (Ganxi Formation)
- †L. yunnanensis Wang & Dong, 1989 - Late Silurian (Ludlow) of Yunnan, China (Miaokao Formation)

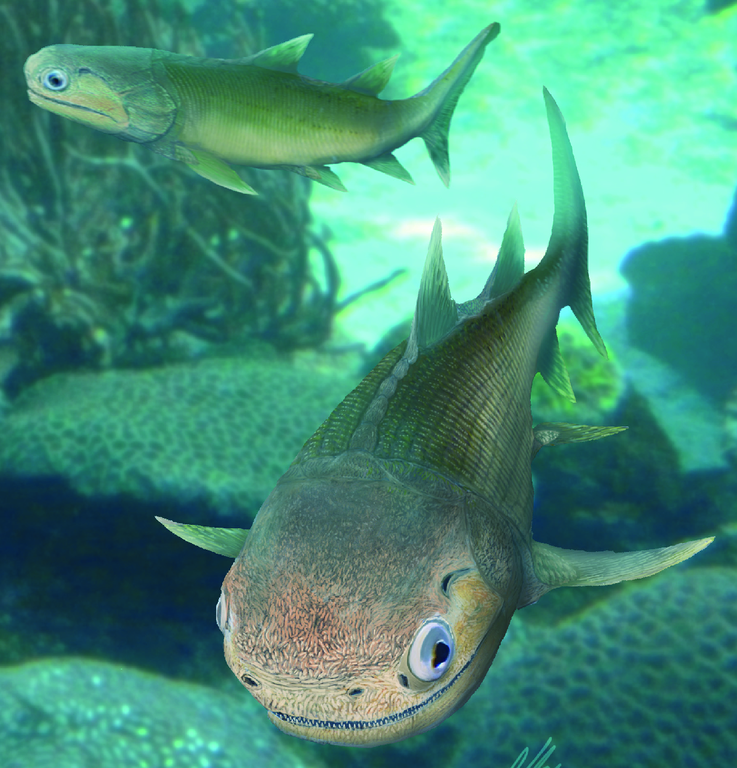
Life restoration of L. toombsi

Ligulalepis was first described from isolated scales found in the Murrumbidgee Group limestones of New South Wales (Emsian age) by Hans-Peter Schultze (1968) and further material described by Burrow (1994). A nearly complete skull found in the same general location was described in Nature by Basden et al. (2000) claiming the genus was closely related to basal ray-finned fishes (Actinopterygii). In 2015 Flinders University student Benedict King found a more complete new skull of this genus which was formally described by Clement et al. (2018), showing Ligulalepis to be on the stem of all osteichthyans.

== See also ==
- Prehistoric fish
- List of prehistoric bony fish
