= Xiaobo Yu =

Dr. Xiaobo Yu is a Chinese palaeontologist and professor on biological sciences. Yu is credited with first describing the lobe-finned fish Psarolepis romeri, a transitional species between fish and amphibians. Yu is currently a professor at Kean University in Union, New Jersey.
