= Xishancun Formation =

Geologic formation in Yunnan, China

The Xishancun Formation is a geological formation located at Qujing, Yunnan, South China. Xishancun Formation has remains of petalichthyid and galeaspid fish and it represents the Early Devonian period (Early Lochkovian) of China. A new species of Galeaspida was discovered in the formation.

== See also ==
- List of fossil sites (with link directory)
