= Romeriscus =

Scientific classification
- Kingdom: Animalia
- Phylum: Chordata
- Clade: Tetrapoda
- Class: incertae sedis
- Genus: †Romeriscus; Baird & Carroll, 1968
- Species: †R. periallus

Binomial name
- †Romeriscus periallus Baird & Carroll, 1968

Genus of prehistoric tetrapod

Romeriscus is a dubious genus of tetrapod, found in the Lower Pennsylvanian Port Hood Formation in Nova Scotia. The genus contains a single species, Romeriscus periallus, from a single specimen, YPM-PU16 482, which comprises cranial and postcranial remains.

Romeriscus was first described in 1967 by Donald Baird and Robert Carroll, who classified it as a limnoscelid based on their interpretation of its skull structure. In 1992, this claim was refuted by Michel Laurin and Robert Reisz, who state that the poor preservation of the skull makes such a claim impossible, and that due to its poor condition, the frontal and postfrontal portions of the skull cannot be properly identify the species as a limnoscelid. Laurin & Reisz concluded that Romeriscus cannot conclusively be classified as a limnoscelid or amniote. Instead, they classified it as Tetrapoda incertae sedis, and a dubious taxon. They noted that microsaur or lepospondyl affinities could not be excluded, but that it likely is not a temnospondyl.
