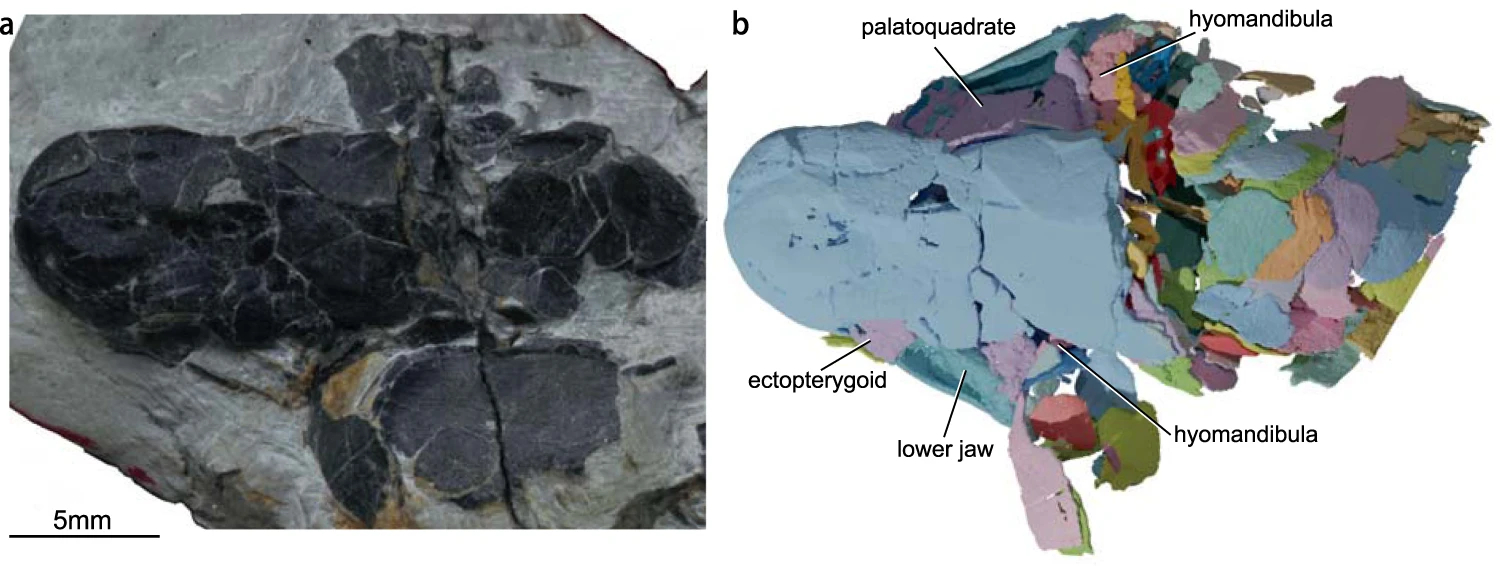
- Photograph (a) & virtual rendering (b) of specimen IVPP V28375 in dorsal view

Scientific classification
- Kingdom: Animalia
- Phylum: Chordata
- Class: Dipnoi
- Genus: †Youngolepis

Type species
- †Youngolepis praecursor Chang & Yu, 1981

= Youngolepis =

Youngolepis Temporal range: Early Devonian

Extinct genus of lungfish

Youngolepis is a genus of prehistoric lungfish which lived during the Early Devonian period (Lochkovian to Pragian stages, about 407-416 million years ago). Fossils of Y. praecursor have been found in the Xitun Formation of China & the Bac Bun Formation of Trang Xa, Vietnam. Some additional fossil specimens from the Xishancun Formation of China have been referred to Youngolepis sp. & represent the oldest known occurrence of the genus. In addition, Y. praecursor is also found in the Xujiachong formation
