= Mandagery Sandstone =

Lagerstätte formation in Canowindra, Australia

- Stratigraphic range: Late Devonian (Frasnian or late Famennian)
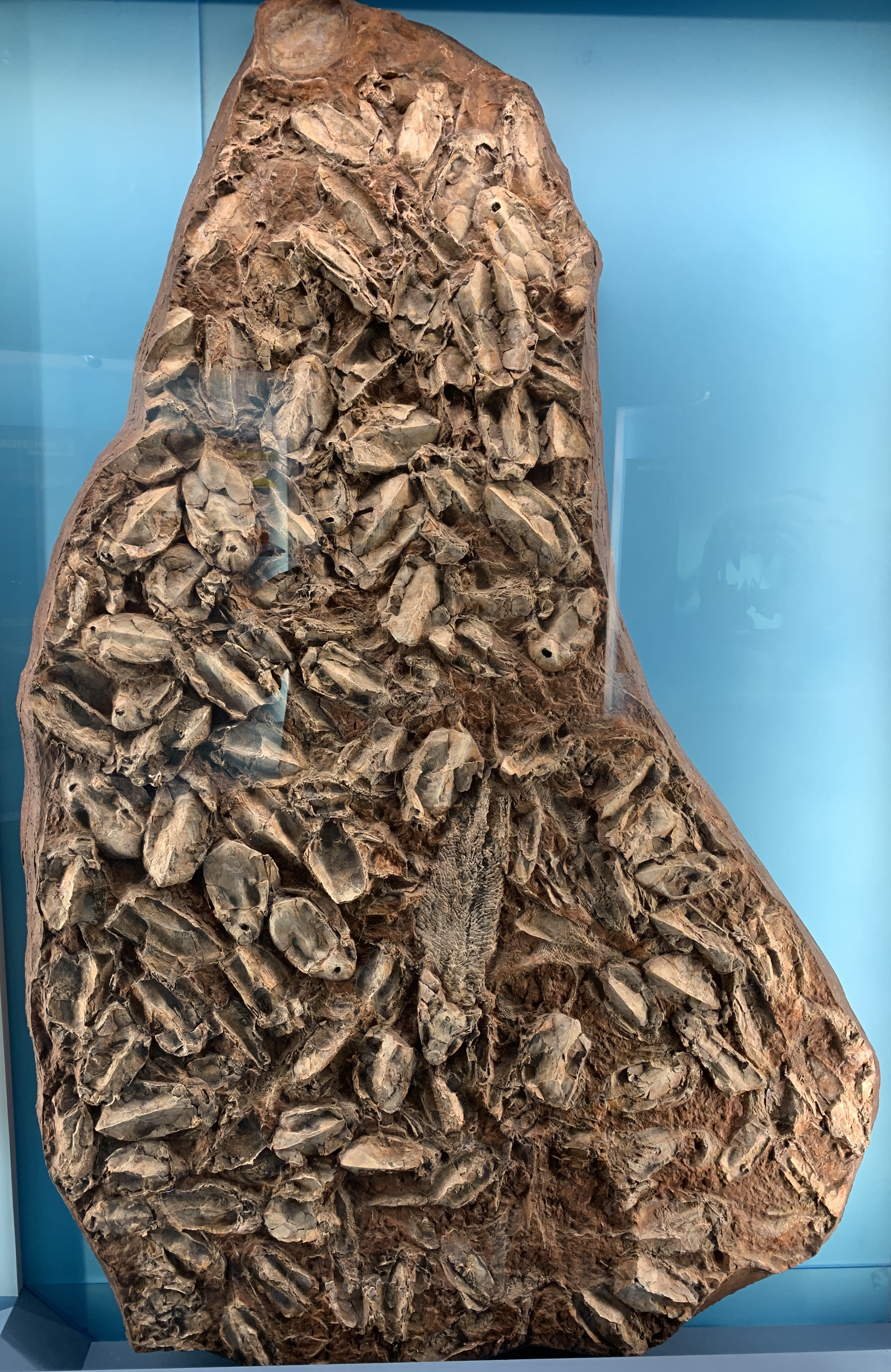
- Cast of the slab found in 1955, that preserves 114 fish individuals, which died when their freshwater pond dried up. Most of the individuals in the slab are the placoderms Remigolepis walkeri and Bothriolepis yeungae. One sarcopterygian individual is present, Canowindra grossi, the largest fish in the slab. Two small and inconspicuous juvenile Groenlandaspis are also preserved.
- Type: Geological formation
- Unit of: Nangar Subgroup, Hervey Group
- Underlies: Bumberry Formation, Pipe Formation
- Overlies: Kadina Formation, Hunter Siltstone Formation, Clagger Sandstone

Lithology
- Primary: Sandstone, Siltstone

Location
- Location: Canowindra, New South Wales
- Coordinates: 33°34′S 148°40′E
- Region: New South Wales
- Country: Australia
- Mandagery Sandstone (Australia) Mandagery Sandstone (New South Wales)

The Mandagery Sandstone is a Late Devonian geological formation in New South Wales, Australia. It is one of several famed Australian lagerstätten, with thousands of exceptional fish fossils found at a site near the town of Canowindra.

A sandstone block containing 114 fish was discovered in 1955 about 10 km west of Canowindra, on the road to Gooloogong. The Canowindra site was rediscovered by paleontologist Alex Ritchie in 1993, and over 3000 fish fossils have been catalogued and stored at the Australian Museum in Sydney and the local Age of Fishes Museum in Canowindra. Antiarch placoderms make up the majority of specimens recovered; Bothriolepis and Remigolepis are the most abundant fossils, followed by the arthrodire Groenlandaspis. About 20 sarcopterygian (lobe-finned fish) fossils have also been found, including new taxa such as Canowindra, Mandageria, Cabonnichthys, Soederberghia and Gooloogongia. Fossils are preserved as natural moulds in the hard sandstone, filled by a mixture of sandstone, clay, and rare fragments of remaining bone. The detail of preservation is high, with individual armor plates, scales, and the internal structures of major bones all visible in latex casts produced from the moulds.

The Mandagery Sandstone is part of the Hervey Group, a cluster of deformed Paleozoic sediments located near the center of the Lachlan Fold Belt in New South Wales. It is mostly fine-grained red orthoquartzite sandstone, arranged into a number of short sequences. Towards the top of each sequence, the red sandstone is supplanted by thin beds of white sandstone and red siltstone. Cross-bedding and mudcracks indicate that the sandstone was deposited close to the shore. U-Pb dating has estimated that the Canowindra locality is from the Late Famennian (363 ± 3 Ma).

== Paleobiota ==
Color key: Taxon / Reclassified taxon / Taxon falsely reported as present / Dubious taxon or junior synonym / Ichnotaxon / Ootaxon / Morphotaxon

Notes
Uncertain or tentative taxa are in small text
~~crossed out~~ taxa are discredited.

Placoderms of the Mandagery Sandstone
Genus	Species	Clade	Images
Bothriolepis	B. yeungae	Antiarchi, Bothriolepididae	
Groenlandaspis	G. sp.	Arthrodira, Groenlandaspididae	
Remigolepis	R. walkeri	Antiarchi, Remigolepidae	A diagram of Remigolepis walkeri.

Sarcopterygians of the Mandagery Sandstone
Genus	Species	Clade	Images
Cabonnichthys	C. burnsi	Rhipidistia, Tristichopteridae	Skull restoration of Cabonnichthys.
Canowindra	C. grossi	Tetrapodomorpha, Canowindridae	A specimen of Canowindra surrounded by placoderms.
Gooloogongia	G. loomesi	Rhizodontiformes incertae sedis	A restoration of Gooloogongia.
Mandageria	M. fairfaxi	Tetrapodomorpha, Tristichopteridae	The skull of Mandageria.
Soederberghia	S. simpsoni	Dipnoi, Rhynchodipteridae	

Invertebrates of the Mandagery Sandstone
Genus	Species	Clades	Images
Apsilingula	A. parkesensis	Lingulida, Lingulidae	
Kasibelinurus	K. amicorum	Xiphosura, Kasibelinuridae	The holotype of Kasibelinurus amicorum.
Lingula	L. gregaria	Lingulida, Lingulidae	Lingula anatina shell.

Plants of the Mandagery Sandstone
Genus	Species	Clade	Images
Archaeopteris	A. macilenta	Archaeopteridales, Archaeopteridaceae	Reconstruction of A. macilenta.
Leptophloeum	L. australe	Lycopodiophyta, incertae sedis	Leptophloeum fossil.

== See also ==
- Canowindra
- Age of Fishes Museum
- Mandageria
- Canowindra (fish)
- Gooloogongia
