= Hunter Siltstone =

Geologic formation in New South Wales, Australia

- Stratigraphic range: Late Devonian (Famennian) 372.1–358.8 Ma
- Type: Geological formation
- Unit of: Beargamil Subgroup, Hervey Group
- Underlies: Mandagery Sandstone
- Overlies: Peaks Sandstone

Lithology
- Primary: Siltstone, shale
- Other: Sandstone

Location
- Location: Grenfell, New South Wales
- Coordinates: 33°54′0″S 148°09′0″E
- Region: New South Wales
- Country: Australia
- Hunter Siltstone (Australia) Hunter Siltstone (New South Wales)

The Hunter Siltstone is a geological unit of the Hervey Group, located near Grenfell, New South Wales, Australia. The formation dates back to the Famennian stage Late Devonian epoch, with the Grenfell fish fauna representing the youngest known Devonian non-marine assemblage of eastern Australia.

Its strata comprie of red siltstones and shales, with a degree of fine-grained red siltstones, which make up high profile valleys in between the strike ridges of the Mandagery and Peaks Sandstones.

It records several sarcopterygians, such as the tristichopterid ‘cf. Eusthenodon sp. indet.’, formerly known as Eusthenodon gavini., the lungfish Adelargo schultzei, an indeterminate species of Groenlandaspis, and the rhipidistian Grenfellia meemannae. Several localities in the middle part of the Hunter Silstone have produced phyllolepid placoderms like Bothriolepis and Remigolepis, This is in contrast to the Grenfell fossil site, located at the uppermost layers of the formation, which instead has non-phyllolepid placoderms like Grenfellaspis, the only known sinolepid outside of Asia.

== Fossil content ==
Placoderms of the Hunter Siltstone
Genus	Species	Clade	Images
Bothriolepis	B. grenfellensis	Antiarchi, Bothriolepididae	Reconstruction of Bothriolepis africana.
Grenfellaspis	G. branagani	Antiarchi, Sinolepidae	
Groenlandaspis	G. sp.	Arthrodira, Groenlandaspididae	A restoration of Groenlandaspis pennsylvanica.
Remigolepis	R. redcliffensis	Antiarchi, Remigolepidae	Reconstruction of the related Remigolepis zhongweiensis.

Sarcopterygians of the Hunter Siltstone
Genus	Species	Clade	Images
Adelargo	A. schultzei	Dipnoi incertae sedis	
Grenfellacanthus	G. zerinae	Ischnacanthiformes, Ischnacanthidae	
Grenfellia	G. meemannae	Rhipidistia incertae sedis	
Holoptychius	H. sp.	Porolepiformes, Holoptychiidae	A restoration of Holoptychius sp.
Yambira	Y. thomsoni	Osteolepiformes, Osteolepididae	
cf. Eusthenodon (Formerly Eusthenodon gavini)	sp. indet.	Tetrapodomorpha, Tristichopteridae	Reconstruction of Eusthenodon.
Holoptychiidae indet.	sp. indet.	Porolepiformes, Holoptychiidae	
