= Mount Ritchie =

Mountain in Oates Land, Antarctica

Mount Ritchie (78°32′S 158°25′E) is a mountain rising over 1600 m in the southeast part of Warren Range, Antarctica. The feature is 5.6 km (3 nmi) northeast of Wise Peak on the west side of Deception Glacier. It was named by the Victoria University of Wellington Antarctic Expedition (VUWAE), 1970–71, after Alex Ritchie, curator of fossils at the Australian Museum, Sydney, a member of the VUWAE party that discovered important sites of fossil fish in this Skelton Neve area.

== Geology ==
Mount Ritchie consists of a thick sequence of well-exposed, sedimentary strata of the Beacon Supergroup capped by a summit composed of an erosional remnant of a dolerite sill belonging to the Ferrar Dolerite sills. The dolerite summit of Mount Ritchie is underlain by 250 metres (820 ft) of the Weller Coal Measures. It is composed of fossiliferous interbedded Permian sandstone, siltstone, shale, and coal. This geologic unit was deposited by ancient braided rivers and streams. Beneath the Weller Coal Measures lies as much as 85 metres (279 ft) of Metschel Tillite. It consists of glacial diamictite, sandstone, and shale. At and just above the contact with undeformed strata of the underlying Aztec Siltstone, the Metschel Tillite is deformed into textbook, imbricately stacked, soft-sediment thrust sheets up to 15 metres (49 ft) thick. These thrust sheets were caused by the north-eastward advance of grounded ice into a glaciomarine setting during a Late Paleozoic icehouse glacial epoch.

Underlying the Metschel Tillite and forming the base of Mount Ritchie is over 217 metres (712 ft) of late Devonian Aztec Siltstone. It consists of locally fossiliferous, interbedded shale, siltstone, and crossbedded sandstone of which the upper few meters are locally deformed by glaciotectonic deformation. Typically, the siltstones and shales range from a few centimeters to several meters thick. The sandstones vary in thickness between 0.1 and 15 metres (0.33 and 49.21 ft). These sedimentary strata contain calcrete, fining-upward cycles, red beds, rootlet horizons, mudcracks, and conchostracan fossils, which indicates that they were deposited in floodplains and channels of rivers and streams.

== Fossils ==
Mount Ritchie is an important late Devonian vertebrate fossil site in Antarctica. On Mount Ritchie, the Aztec Siltstone has yielded a varied fauna of fossil vertebrates and conchostracans. The vertebrate fossils include a set of acanthodid acanthodiform jaws (Gyracanthides ?), placoderms (Bothriolepis macphersoni and Pambulaspis antarctica), and other fossil fish. In addition, abundant fossil fish were excavated from near the top of the Aztec Siltstone, including Bothriolepis, Groenlandaspis, and Turinia gondwana. Associated with these fossil fish were palynomorphs including Geminospora lemurata. Among the researchers who have collected and studied fossil vertebrates from Mount Ritchie include the eponymous A. Ritchie.

The Wellner Coal Measures at Mount Ritchie contain abundant Permian leaf, root, petrified wood, and other plant fossils.
