= Darbyshire =

Darbyshire is a surname. Notable people with the surname include:

- Alfred Darbyshire (1839–1908), English architect
- Ann Darbyshire (1926–2007), Canadian printmaker
- Beatrice Darbyshire (1901–1988), Australian artist
- Carolyn Darbyshire (aka Carolyn Darbyshire-McRorie and Carolyn McRorie) (born 1963), Canadian curler
- George Christian Darbyshire (1820–1898), English and Australian civil engineer
- Janet Darbyshire (born ?), British epidemiologist and science administrator
- Maureen Darbyshire (born c. 1952), English actress
- Michael Darbyshire (c. 1917–1979), British television actor
- Richard Darbyshire (1960–2025), English singer and songwriter
- Russell Darbyshire (1880–1948), British Anglican priest
- Sam Darbyshire (born 1989), British television actor
- Thomas Darbyshire (1518–1604), English churchman and Jesuit
- Thomas Darbyshire, birth name of Tommy Cannon (born 1938), English actor and comedian

== See also ==
- Darbyshire railway station, located in Victoria, Australia
- Mount Darbyshire, a bare rock mountain in the Antarctic
