= Grenfell fossil site =

Paleontological site in NSW, Australia

Coordinates: 33°54′S 148°09′E

The Grenfell fossil site is a paleontological site of late Devonian age in the central west of New South Wales, Australia. It was discovered in the late 1970s and lies near the town of Grenfell, some 370 km west of Sydney, and has been the subject of ongoing investigations by the Australian Museum.

The Grenfell site is important as the youngest locality for Devonian fossils in New South Wales, containing a diverse range of placoderm, acanthodian and sarcopterygian fishes. The fossils are found in the Hunter Siltstone Formation, of which there are extensive outcrops in the hills around Grenfell. The fish are mainly disarticulated but not extensively damaged, indicating transport after death by running water for a short distance.

== Fossil fauna ==
Sarcopterygians found include cf. Eusthenodon sp. indet (formerly Eusthenodon gavini), Yambira thomsoni, Grenfellia meemanae, Adelargo schultzei and Holoptychius sp. The placoderm genera Groenlandaspis sp. and Grenfellaspis branagani are also known, as is the acanthodian Grenfellacanthus zerinae is also present.
