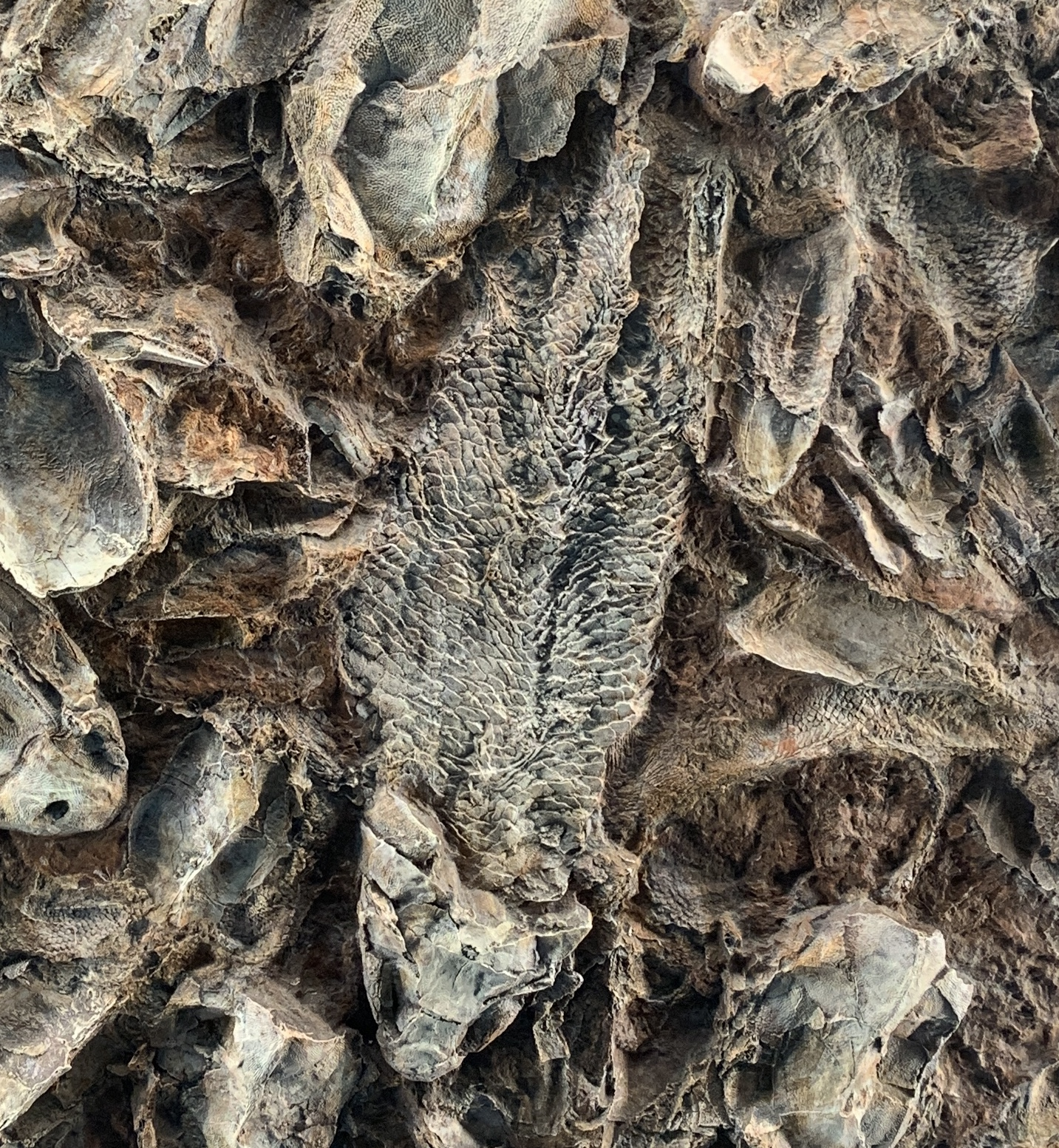
- C. grossi, surrounded by antiarch placoderms Remigolepis walkeri and Bothriolepis yeungae. Cast. Mandagery Sandstone, Canowindra, New South Wales (Australia)

Scientific classification
- Domain: Eukaryota
- Kingdom: Animalia
- Phylum: Chordata
- Clade: Sarcopterygii
- Clade: Tetrapodomorpha
- Family: †Canowindridae
- Genus: †Canowindra; Thomson, 1973
- Species: †C. grossi

Binomial name
- †Canowindra grossi Thomson, 1973

= Canowindra grossi =

Canowindra grossi Temporal range: Late Devonian

Extinct genus of tetrapodomorphs

Canowindra is a prehistoric lobe-finned fish which lived during the Late Devonian period (about 374 to 359 million years ago). The genus is known from only a single well preserved specimen, dubbed Canowindra grossi, after Professor Walter Gross, who spent his career studying lobe-finned fish, and after the Australian town in which it was found, Canowindra. Canowindra grossi was apparently comparatively small in size (about 50 cm) and belongs to the family of Canowindridae.
