= Darbishire =

Darbishire is a surname. Notable people with the surname include:

- Arthur Dukinfield Darbishire (1879–1915), British zoologist
- Charles Darbishire (1875–1925), British politician and East India merchant
- Godfrey Darbishire (1853–1889), English rugby player
- Helen Darbishire (1881–1961), English literary scholar
- Henry Astley Darbishire (1825–1899), British architect
- Robert Dukinfield Darbishire (1826–1908), English lawyer and philanthropist

== Fictional characters ==
- Charles Edwin Jeremy Darbishire, the school friend of John Jennings in the Jennings novels by Anthony Buckeridge

== Other ==
- Darbishire Quad, a building and quad of Somerville College, Oxford

== See also ==
- Darbyshire
- Derbyshire, English county
