= Hamner Nunatak =

Hamner Nunatak (78°33′S 157°56′E) is a nunatak lying west of the Warren Range, Antarctica, 5 nautical miles (9 km) west-northwest of Wise Peak. It was named by the Advisory Committee on Antarctic Names in 1964 for Karl C. Hamner, a biologist at McMurdo Station, 1960–61.
