= Alex Ritchie =

Australian palaeontologist (1935–2023)

- Born: 1935
- Died: 2023 (aged 87–88); Canberra
- Scientific career
- Fields: Paleontology

Alex Ritchie (1935-2023) was a palaeontologist at the Australian Museum in Sydney and the Australian National University in Canberra. He was a member of the Antarctic Expedition that discovered important sites of fossil fish in Antarctica, including Mount Ritchie, which is named after him.

== Biography ==
Alex Ritchie was born in Scotland in 1935. He grew up in a small village on the outskirts of Edinburgh. His father was an oil shale miner and his mother was a nurse's aid. During the winters, and with rationing still in place, he was regularly sent out to search for coal in the 'bings' (slag heaps) surrounding his home. One day he came across a fossil, which became a lifelong passion. He emigrated to Australia in 1968, and took up a position at the Australian Museum in Sydney.

In 1970-1971, Ritchie was a member of the Victoria University of Wellington Antarctic Expedition. The Skelton Neve area was known to have fossils, but earlier finds were fragmentary. The University sent a group of specialist to collect as many well-preserved fossils as they could find. In particular, Ritchie searched for the fossilised jaw of a sarcopterygian, an air breathing lobe-finned fish that gave rise to first tetrapods. He not only found a jaw bone, which he extracted with a jackhammer, but a plethora of Devonian fossils of fish that shed new light on continental drift. Among his discoveries were the fossilised bony plates of a strange armoured fish that Ritchie initially thought was an original discovery, but which he subsequently identified as Groenlandaspis a Devonian freshwater placoderm that had been found in Greenland in 1929-1931. The site where many of the expedition's discoveries were made was named Mount Ritchie in his honour in 2000.

Ritchie kept 16 mm film footage of the expedition which lay on a shelf at his home in Canberra for many years, but it was unwatched because he did not have the equipment to view it. In 2018 he took it to the National Film and Sound Archive in Canberra, which had the equipment, and showed it in its 250-seat Arc Cinema.

In 1993, Ritchie led an expedition to Canowindra, New South Wales, where roadwork in 1955 had uncovered a large rock slab covered with unusual impressions. The expedition removed 70 tonnes of rock to uncover over 3,000 Devonian fish fossils, some of which had never been seen before. Specimens included fish with lungs and with five-fingered limbs. Ritchie helped establish the Canowindra Age of Fishes Museum, one of only two fish fossil museums in the world, which he visited with David Attenborough.

During the 1980s, Ritchie clashed with creationist, religious fanatics who believed the world was created in seven days, who wanted to get have their beliefs taught in schools. Ritchie was one of many scientists who debunked their beliefs.

Ritchie moved to Canberra in 2007 to be closer to his daughter Shona and grandchildren. He became an emeritus at the Australian National University there.

He died in November 2023.
