= Soederberghia =

Soederberghia Temporal range: Late Devonian

Scientific classification
- Domain: Eukaryota
- Kingdom: Animalia
- Phylum: Chordata
- Clade: Sarcopterygii
- Class: Dipnoi
- Family: †Rhynchodipteridae
- Genus: †Soederberghia; Lehman, 1959

Species
- †S. groenlandica (type) Lehman, 1959; †S. simpsoni Ahlberg et al., 2001

Extinct genus of fishes

Soederberghia is an extinct genus of prehistoric lungfish that lived during the late Devonian period.

Soederberghia probably had a widespread range because fossils have been discovered in North America, Greenland and Australia.

The long-snouted Soederberghia shares many relationships with the lungfish Rhynchodipterus.

The genus is named after paleontologist Gunnar Säve-Söderbergh.
