= Age of Fishes Museum =

Natural history museum in Canowindra, Australia

Front of the museum building in 2020

Internationally recognised architect John Andrews designed the museum building

The Age of Fishes Museum is one of only two (the other one, its sister museum, is at Miguasha in Quebec, Canada) Devonian fish fossil museums in the world and is a National Heritage site due to its international scientific significance. Located in Canowindra, New South Wales, Australia, it was established in 1998. The Museum was designed by Australian architect, John Andrews. The museum houses a huge collection of Devonian fish fossils found at the Mandagery Sandstone in the Canowindra area.

In 1955, roadworks near Canowindra uncovered a large rock slab covered with unusual impressions, which was then placed to the side of the road whilst roadworks continued. A local apiarist later found this slab and, believing it to contain fossils, contacted the Australian Museum about it. In 1993 paleontologist Alex Ritchie led a dig at the site of the initial fossil discovery. That dig led to the removal of 70 tonnes of rock slab and revealed over 3,000 fish fossils from the Devonian period. The dig site has led to several new discoveries and tells the story of events that occurred over 360 million years ago.

In 2018 the museum was awarded a gold medal in the Specialised Tourism Services category at the Country and Outback Regional Tourism Awards

== See also ==
- American Museum of Natural History
- Natural History Museum, London
