= Warren Range =

Mountain range in Antarctica

Warren Range (78°28′S 158°16′E) is an Antarctic mountain range about 15 nautical miles (28 km) long just west of Boomerang Range, with which it lies parallel, in Oates Land. Discovered by the Northern Survey Party of the Commonwealth Trans-Antarctic Expedition (1956–58), which called the highest summit "Mount Warren" after Guyon Warren, a member of the party in 1957–58. To avoid confusion with another mountain of the same name, the name Warren has instead been applied to the whole range.

== Features ==
Geographical features include:

- Deception Glacier
- Mount Guyon
- Mount Ritchie
- Skelton Icefalls
- Wise Peak

Nearby features are:

- Hamner Nunatak
- Mount Darbyshire
