= Mount Guyon =

Mountain in Oates Land, Antarctica

Mount Guyon (78°25′S 158°17′E) is a bluff-type mountain with a small summit area, 2,541 metres (8,337 ft) high. It rises at the west side of Deception Glacier and forms the highest elevation in the Warren Range in Antarctica. The Northern Party of the Commonwealth Trans-Antarctic Expedition (1956–58) called this feature "Mount Warren" after Guyon Warren, a member of the field party in 1957–58. That name was not adopted in order to avoid confusion with another Mount Warren, so the name Mount Guyon was approved in keeping with the spirit of the original naming.
