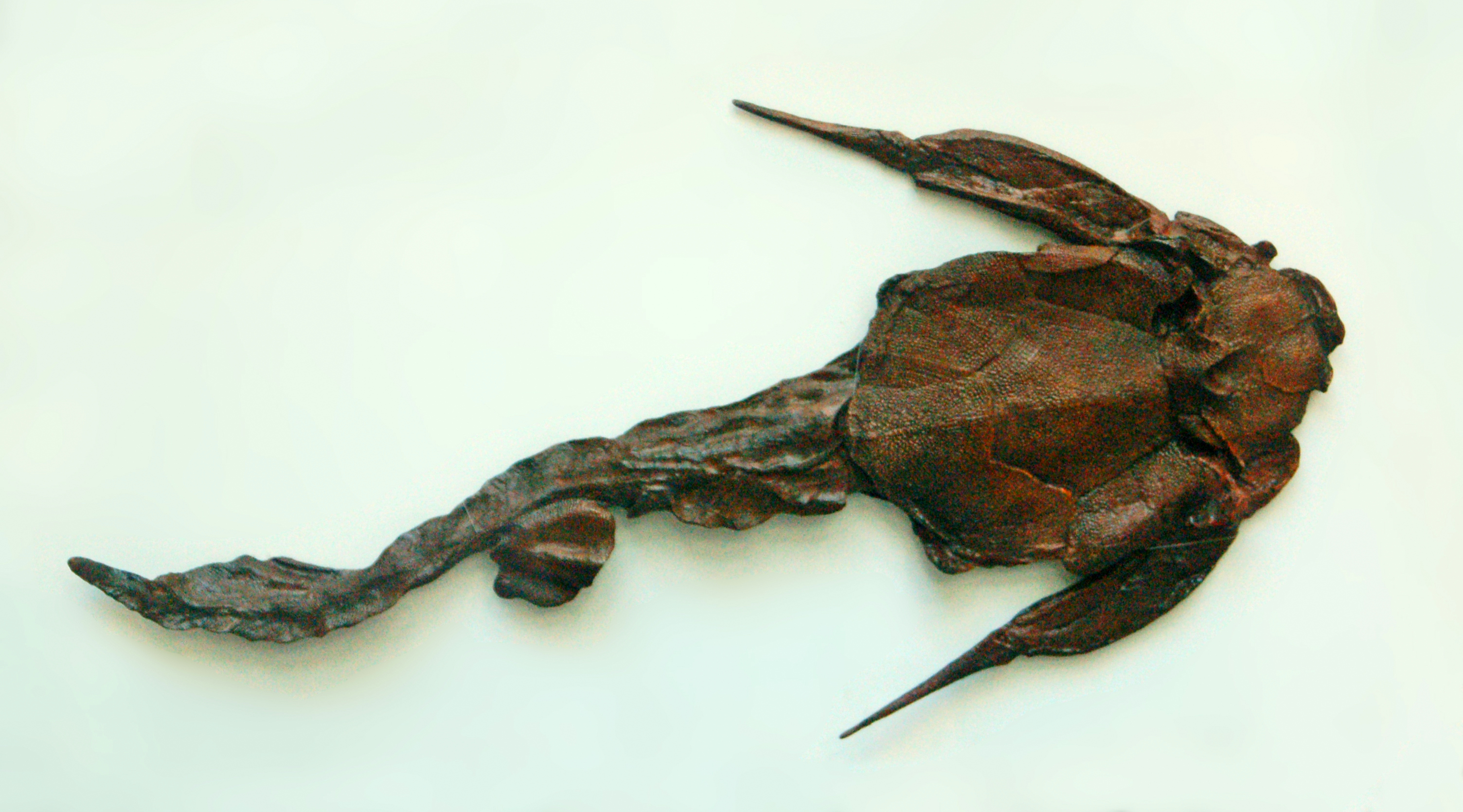
- Bothriolepis canadensis cast
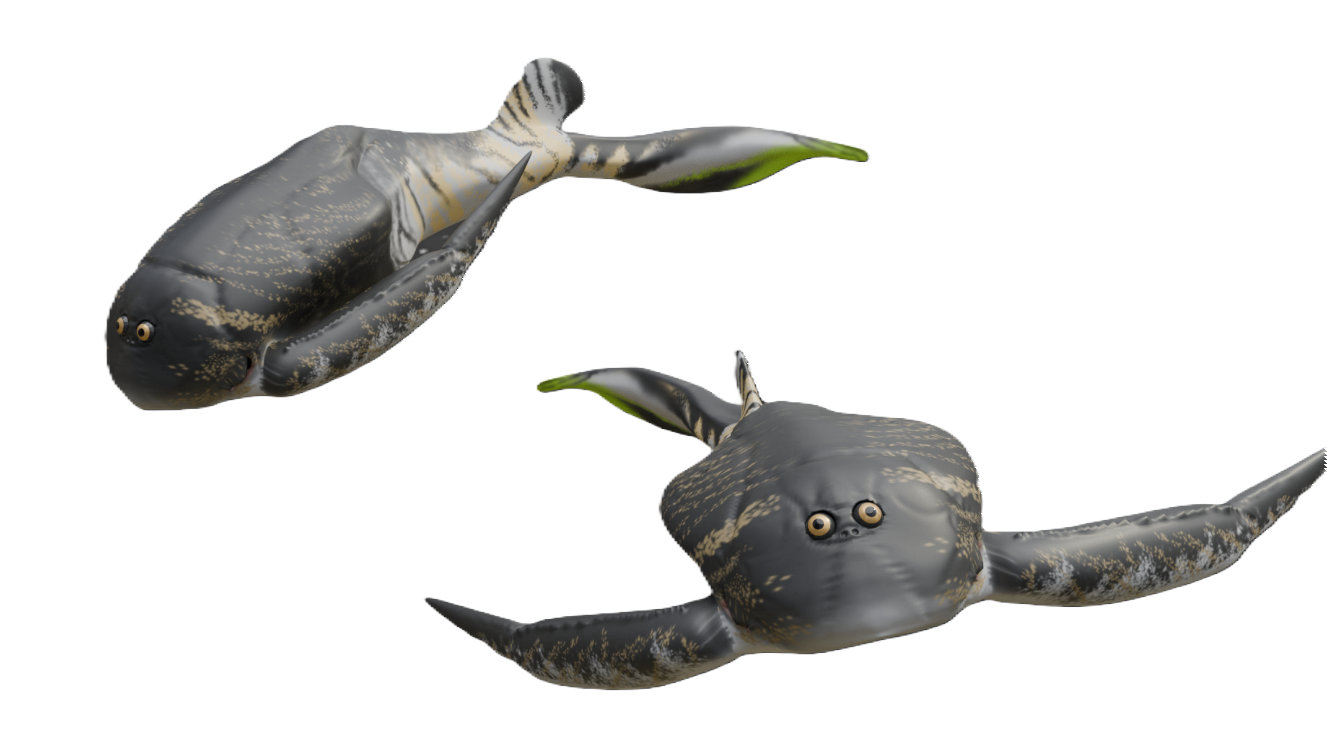
- Life restoration of Bothriolepis canadensis after Béchard et al. (2014)

Scientific classification
- Kingdom: Animalia
- Phylum: Chordata
- Class: †Placodermi
- Order: †Antiarchi
- Family: †Bothriolepididae
- Genus: †Bothriolepis; Eichwald, 1840

Species
- Holotype: B. ornata Eichwald, 1840; B. africana Long et al., 1997; B. alexi Young, 1988; B. alvesiensis Stensio, 1948; B. amankonyrica Malinovskaja, 1988; B. antarctica Woodward, 1921; B. askinae Young, 1988; B. babichevi Malinovskaja, 1992; B. barretti Young, 1988; B. bindareii Long, 1983; B. canadensis Whiteaves, 1880; B. cellulosa Pander, 1846; B. ciecere Lyarskaja, 1974; B. coloradensis Eastman, 1904; B. cristata Traquair, 1895; B. cullodenensis Long, 1983; B. dairbhrensis Dupret et al., 2023; B. darbiensis Denison, 1951; B. dorakarasugensis Moloshnikov, 2009; B. evaldi Lyarskaja, 1986; B. favosa Agassiz, 1844; B. fergusoni Long, 1983; B. gigantea Traquair, 1888; B. gippslandiensis Hills, 1929; B. grenfellensis Johanson, 1996; B. groenlandica Heintz, 1930; B. hayi Miles, 1968; B. heckeri Luksevics, 2001; B. hicklingi Miles, 1968; B. hydrophila Agassiz, 1844; B. jani Luksevics, 1986; B. jarviki Stensio, 1948; B. jazwicensis Szrek, 2004; B. jeremijevi; B. karawaka Young, 1988; B. kassini Malinovskaja, 1988; B. kohni Young, 1988; B. kwangtungensis Pan, 1964; B. laverocklochensis Miles, 1968; B. leptocheira Traquair, 1893; B. lochangensis Pan, 1964; B. lohesti Leriche, 1931; B. macphersoni Young, 1988; B. macrocephala Egerton, 1862; B. maeandrina; B. markovskii Moloshnikov, 2010; B. mawsoni Young, 1988; B. maxima Gross, 1933; B. meandrina Horrmann, 1911; B. minor Newberry, 1889; B. nielseni Stensio, 1948; B. nikitinae Malinovskaja, 1988; B. nitida Leidy, 1856; B. niushoushanensis Pan & Wang, 1980; B. obesa Traquair, 1888; B. obrutschewi Gross, 1934; B. ornata Andrews, 1982; B. panderi Lahusen, 1880; B. paradoxa Agassiz, 1845; B. pavariensis Lyarskaja, 1974; B. perija Young & Moody, 2002; B. portalensis Young, 1988; B. prima Gross, 1934; B. rex Downs et al., 2016; B. sanzarensis Moloshnikov, 2010; B. shaokuanensis Liu, 1963; B. sibrica Obruchev, 1941; B. sinensis Chi, 1940; B. sosnensis Moloshnikov, 2003; B. stevensoni Miles, 1968; B. tastenica Malinovskaja, 1988; B. tatongensis Long & Werdelin, 1985; B. taylori Miles, 1968; B. traquairi Bryant, 1924; B. trautscholdi Jaekel, 1927; B. tungseni Chang, 1965; B. turanica Obruchev, 1939; B. verrucosa Young & Gorter, 1981; B. virginiensis Weems et al., 1981; B. volongensis Lyarskaja & Luksevics, 1998; B. vuwae Young, 1988; B. warreni Long, 1983; B. wilsoni Miles, 1968; B. yeungae Johanson, 1998; B. yunnanensis Liu, 1962; B. zadonica Obrucheva, 1983; B. zhujiangyuanensis Xian et al., 2025

= Bothriolepis =

Bothriolepis Temporal range: Late Devonian ~387–360 Ma

Diverse genus of placoderm fishes of the Devonian

Bothriolepis (from Greek: βόθρος bóthros, 'trench' and Greek: λεπίς lepis 'scale') was a widespread, abundant and diverse genus of antiarch placoderms that lived during the Middle to Late Devonian period of the Paleozoic Era. Historically, Bothriolepis resided in an array of paleo-environments spread across every paleocontinent, including near shore marine and freshwater settings. Most species of Bothriolepis were characterized as relatively small, benthic, freshwater detritivores (organisms that obtain nutrients by consuming decomposing plant/animal material), averaging around 30 centimetres (12 in) in length. However, the largest species, B. rex, had an estimated bodylength of 170 centimetres (67 in). Although expansive with over 60 species found worldwide, comparatively Bothriolepis is not unusually more diverse than most modern bottom dwelling species around today.

== Classification ==
Bothriolepis is a genus placed within the placoderm order Antiarchi. The earliest antiarch placoderms first appeared in the Silurian period of the Paleozoic Era and could be found distributed on every paleocontinent by the Devonian period. The earliest members of Bothriolepis appear by the Middle Devonian.

Antiarchs, as well as other placoderms, are morphologically diverse and are characterized by bony plates that cover their head and the anterior part of the trunk. Early ontogenetic stages of placoderms had thinner bony plates within both the head and trunk-shield, which allowed for easy distinction between early placoderm ontogenetic stages within the fossil record and taxa that possessed fully developed bony plates but were small by characterization. Placoderm bony plates were generally made up of three layers, including a compact basal lamellar bony layer, a middle spongy bony layer and a superficial layer; Bothriolepis can be classified as a placoderm since it possesses these layers.

Placoderms were extinct by the end of the Devonian. Placodermi is a paraphyletic group of the clade Gnathostomata, which includes all jawed vertebrates. It is unclear exactly when gnathostomes emerged, but the scant early fossil record indicates that it was sometime in the Early Palaeozoic era. The last species of Bothriolepis died out, together with the rest of Placodermi, at the end of the Devonian period.

== General anatomy ==
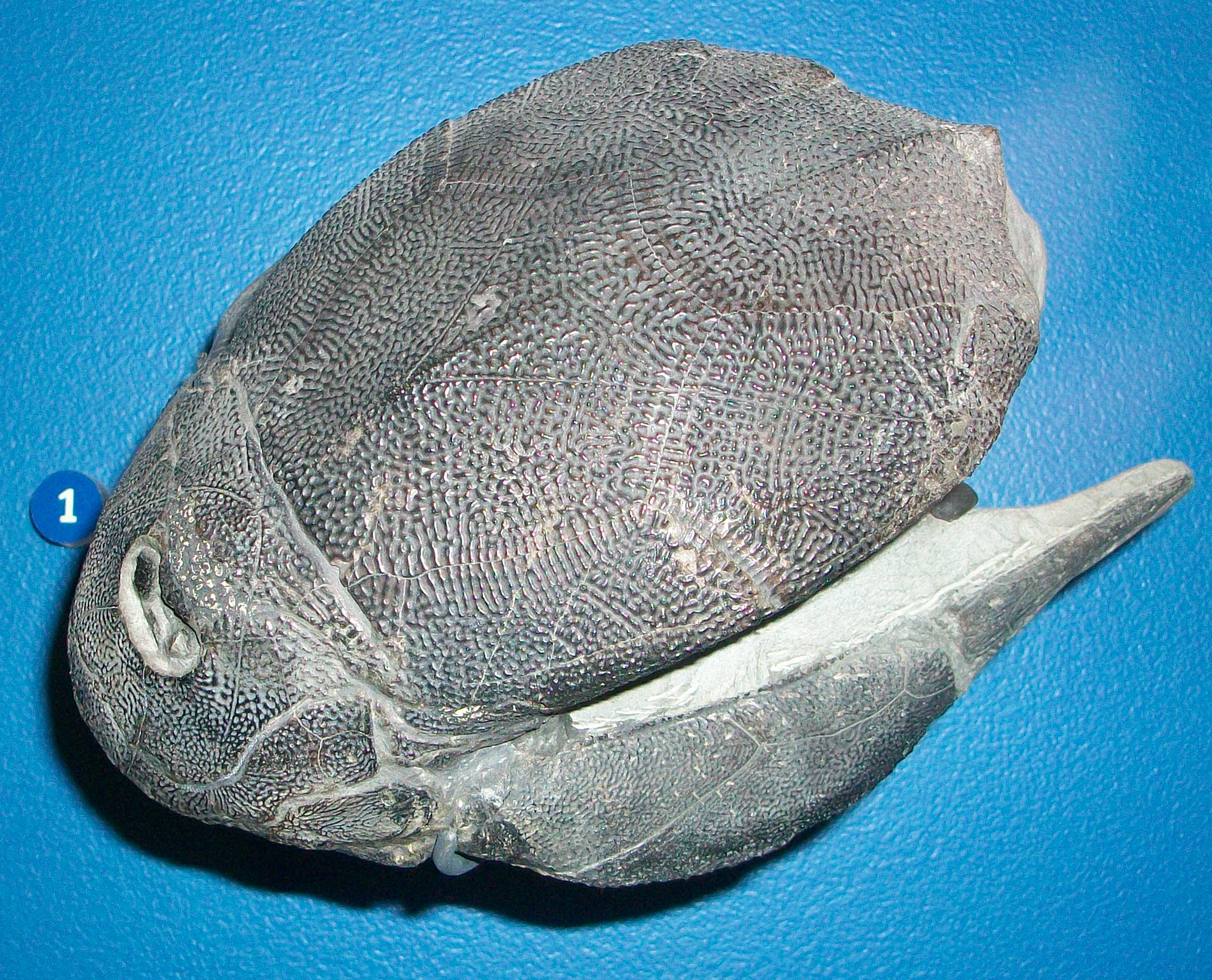
B. canadensis fossil in the Field Museum of Natural History, Chicago

=== Head ===
There are two openings through the head of Bothriolepis: a keyhole opening along the midline on the upper side for the eyes and nostrils and an opening for the mouth on the lower side near the anterior end of the head. A discovery regarding preserved structures that appear to be nasal capsules confirms the belief that the external nasal openings lay on the dorsal side of the head near the eyes. Additionally, the position of the mouth on the ventral side of the skull is consistent with the typical horizontal resting orientation of Bothriolepis. It had a special feature on its skull, a separate partition of bone below the opening for the eyes and nostrils enclosing the nasal capsules called a preorbital recess.

=== Jaw ===
A new sample from the Gogo Formation in the Canning Basin of Western Australia has provided evidence regarding the morphological features of the visceral jaw elements of Bothriolepis. Using the sample, it is evident that the mental plate (a dermal bone that forms the upper part of the jaw) of antiarchs is homologous with the suborbital plate found in other placoderms. The lower jawbone consists of a differentiated blade and biting portions. Next to the mandibular joint are the prelateral and infraprelateral plates, which both are canal-bearing bones. The palatoquadrate lacks a high orbital process and was attached only to the ventral part of the mental plate, proving that the ethmoidal region of the braincase (the region of the skull that separates the brain and nasal cavity) was in fact deeper than originally believed. In addition to the above-listed sample from the Gogo Formation, several other specimens have been found with mouthparts held in the natural position by a membrane that covers the oral region and attaches to the lateral and anterior margins of the head. Bothriolepis has a jaw in which the two halves are separate and in the adult are functionally independent.

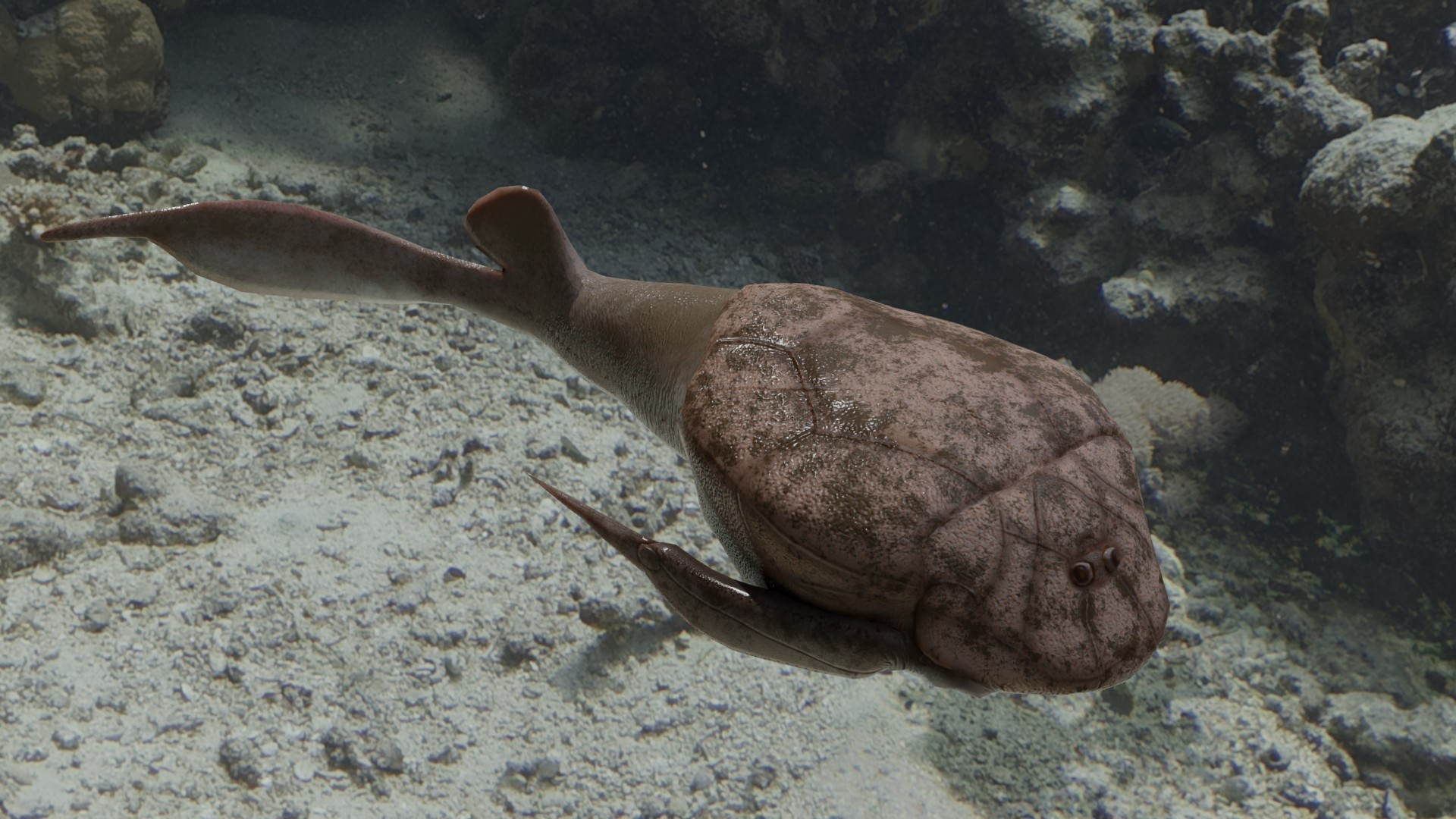
Life restoration of B. canadensis based on Béchard et al. (2014), showing single dorsal fin and no pelvic fins

=== Trunk ===
Bothriolepis had a slender trunk that was likely covered in soft skin with no scales or markings. The orientation that appears to have been mostly stable for resting was the dorsal surface up, evidenced by the flat surface on the ventral side. The trunk's outline suggests that there may have been a notochord present surrounded by a membranous sheath, however, there is no direct evidence of this since the notochord is made up of soft tissue, which is not typically preserved in the fossil record. Similar to other antiarchs, the thoracic shield of Bothriolepis was attached to its heavily armored head. Its box-like body was enclosed in armor plates, providing protection from predators. Attached to the ventral surface of the trunk is a large, thin, circular plate marked by deep-lying lines and superficial ridges. This plate lies just below the opening to the cloaca.

=== Dermal skeleton ===
The dermal skeleton is organized in three layers: a superficial lamellar layer, a cancellous spongiosa, and a compact basal lamellar layer. Even in early ontogeny, these layers are apparent in specimen of Bothriolepis canadensis. The compact layers develop first. The superficial layer is speculated to have denticles that may have been made of cellular bone.

=== Fins and tail ===
Bothriolepis had a long pair of spine-like pectoral fins, jointed at the base, and again a little more than halfway along. These spike-like fins were probably used to lift the body clear off the bottom; its heavy armor would have made it sink quickly as soon as it lost forward momentum. It may also have used its pectoral fins to throw sediment (mud, sand or otherwise) over itself. In addition to the pectoral fins, it is originally considered to have two dorsal fins, but existence of a low, elongated anterior dorsal fin was denied in 1996, and now it is considered to have only a high rounded posterior dorsal fin. The caudal tail was elongated, ending in a narrow band, but is unfortunately rarely preserved in fossils. Bothriolepis lacked pelvic fins. Early antiarchs like Parayunnanolepis had pelvic fins, which implies secondary loss of pelvic fin in Bothriolepis.

== Soft anatomy ==
Structures composed of soft tissue are typically not preserved in fossils because they break down easily and decompose much faster than hard tissues, meaning that the fossil record often lacks information regarding the internal anatomy of fossil species. Preservation of soft tissue structures can sometimes occur, however, if sediments fill the internal structures of an organism upon or after its death. Robert Denison's paper titled "The Soft Anatomy of Bothriolepis" explores the forms and organs of Bothriolepis. These internal structures were preserved when different types of sediments surrounding the exterior of the animal-filled the internal carapaces (only organs that communicate with the exterior could be preserved in this manner). Three different sediment types were identified within the different sections of Bothriolepis: the first a pale greenish-gray medium-textured sandstone largely consisting of calcite; the second similar but finer sediment which preserves many of the organ forms; and the third distinct, fine-grained siltstone consisting of quartz, mica and other minerals but no calcite. These sediments helped preserve the following internal elements:

=== Alimentary system ===
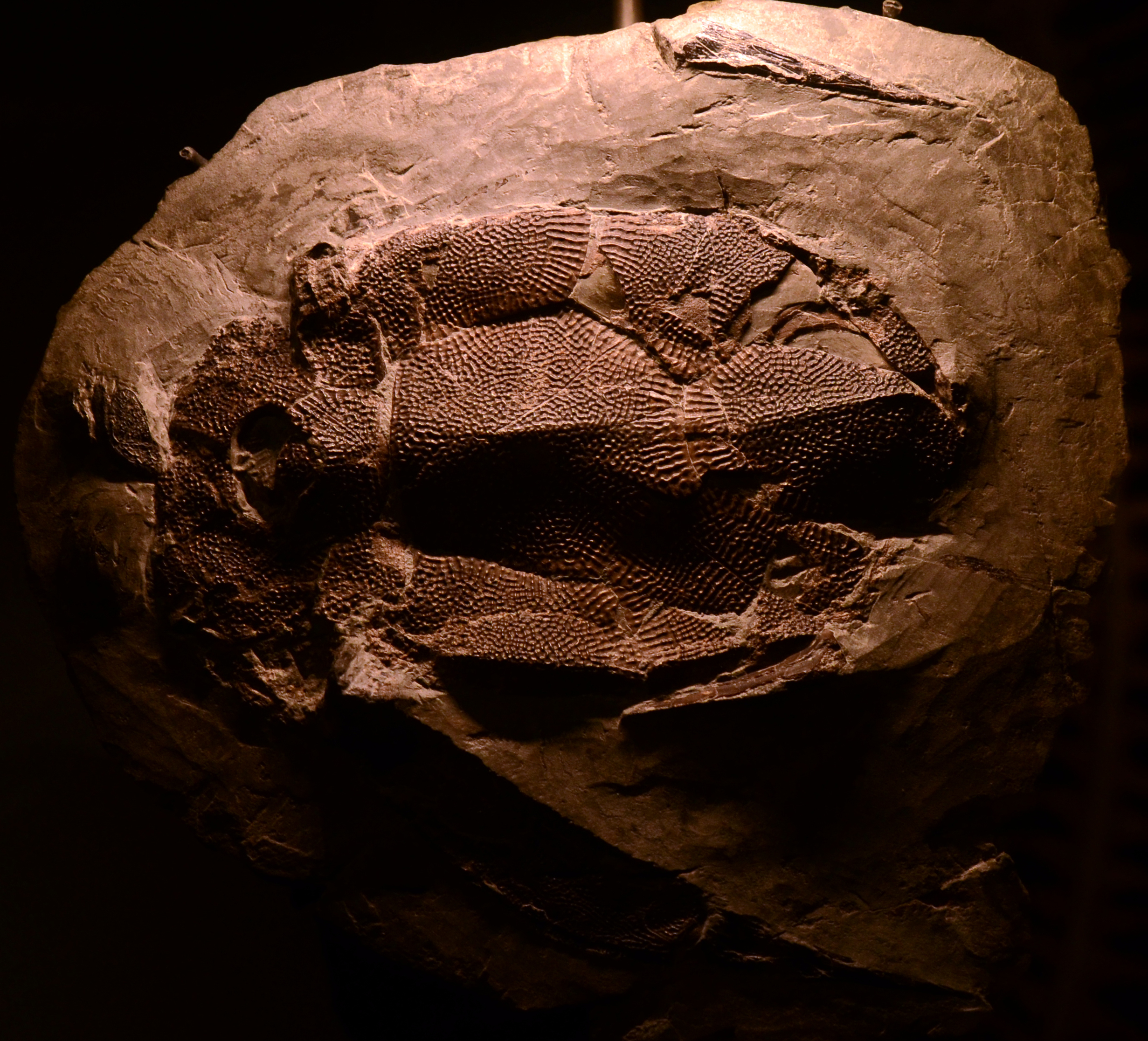
Bothriolepis canadensis fossil at Musée des Confluences.

In general, the alimentary system of Bothriolepis –which includes the organs involved in ingestion, digestion, and removal of waste– can be described as simple and straight, unlike that of humans. It begins at the anterior end of the organism with a small mouth cavity located over the posterior area of the upper jaw plates. Posteriorly from the mouth, the alimentary system extends into a wider and dorso-ventrally flattened region called the pharynx, from which both the gills and lungs arise. The esophagus, which is also characterized as a dorso-ventrally flattened tube, extends from the mouth into the stomach and leads to a flattened ellipsoidal structure. This structure may be homologous to the anterior end of the intestine found in other fish. The flatness of these structures may have been exaggerated when the fossil specimens experienced tectonic deformation through geologic time. The intestine begins narrowly on the anterior end, expands transversely, and then again narrows posteriorly towards the cylindrical rectum, which terminates just within the posterior end of the trunk carapace. While the alimentary system is primitive in nature and lacks an expanded stomach region, it is specialized by an independently acquired complex spiral valve, comparable to that in elasmobranchs and many bony fish and similar to that found in some sharks. A single fold of tissue rolled upon its own axis forms this specialized spiral valve.

=== Gills ===
It is inferred that the gills of Bothriolepis are of the primitive type, though their structure is still not well understood. Laterally, they are enclosed by an opercular fold and are found in the space beneath the lateral part of the head shield, extending medially underneath the neurocranium. Compared to the gills of normally-shaped fish, the gill region of Bothriolepis is considered to be placed more dorsally, is anteriorly more crowded, and in general is relatively short and broad.

=== Paired ventral sacs ===
Extending posteriorly from the trunk carapace are paired ventral sacs that extend to the anterior end of the spiral intestine. The sacs seem to originate at the pharynx as a single median tube, which then broadens posteriorly and eventually splits into two sacs that may be homologous to the lungs of certain dipnoans and tetrapods. It has been hypothesized that these lungs, coupled with the jointed arms and rigid, supportive skeleton, would have allowed Bothriolepis to travel on land. Additionally, as Robert Denison states because there is no evidence of a connection between the external naris and mouth, Bothriolepis likely breathed similarly to present-day lungfish, i.e., by placing the mouth above the water's surface and swallowing air.

Despite the original interpretation presented by Denison in 1941, not all paleontologists agree that placoderms like Bothriolepis actually possessed lungs. For example, in his paper "Lungs" in Placoderms, a Persistent Palaeobiological Myth Related to Environmental Preconceived Interpretations, D. Goujet suggests that although traces of some digestive organs may be apparent from the sedimentary structures, there is no evidence supporting the presence of lungs in the samples from the Escuminac formation of Canada upon which the original assertion was based. He notes that the worldwide distribution of Bothriolepis is restricted to strictly marine environments, and thus believes that the presence of lungs in Bothriolepis is uncertain. Further investigation of the fossils is likely necessary to reach a conclusion about the presence of lungs in Bothriolepis.

== Feeding ==
Bothriolepis, as with all other antiarchs, are thought to have fed by directly swallowing mouthfuls of mud and other soft sediments in order to digest detritus, small or microorganisms, algae, and other forms of organic matter in the swallowed sediments. Additionally, the positioning of the mouth on the ventral side of its head further suggests that Bothriolepis was likely a bottom-feeder. The regular presence of "carbonaceous material in the alimentary tract" is believed to indicate that most of its diet consisted of plant material.

== Distribution ==
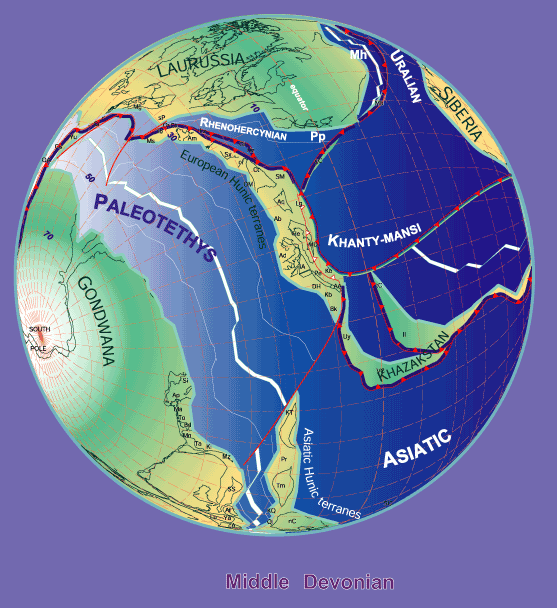
Paleogeography during the Middle Devonian (380 Ma) By Stampfli & Borel, 2000

Bothriolepis fossils are found in Middle and Late Devonian strata (from 387 to 360 million years ago). Because the fossils are found in freshwater sediments, Bothriolepis is presumed to have spent most of its life in freshwater rivers and lakes, but was probably able to enter salt water as well, because its range appeared to have corresponded with the Devonian continental coastlines. Large groupings of Bothriolepis specimens have been found in Asia, Europe, Australia (Gogo Formation and Mandagery Sandstone), Africa (Waterloo Farm lagerstätte) Pennsylvania (Catskill Formation), Quebec (Escuminac Formation), Virginia (Chemung), Colorado, Cuche Formation (Boyacá, Colombia), and all around the world.

=== Catskill Formation site ===
The Catskill Formation (Upper Devonian, Famennian Stage), located in Tioga County, Pennsylvania, is the site of a large sample of small individuals of Bothriolepis. The sample was collected from a series of rock slabs that consisted of partial or complete, articulated, external skeletons. More than two hundred individuals were found packed closely together with little to no overlap. From this sample, much information regarding characteristics of juvenile Bothriolepis can be determined. A morphometric study performed by Jason Downs and co-authors highlights certain characteristics that indicate juvenility in Bothriolepis, including a moderately large head and moderately large orbital fenestra—both of which are characteristics also recognized by Erik Stensio in 1948 in the smallest B. canadensis individuals. Several other features that Stensio marked indicative of young individuals can also be seen exhibited in the Catskill sample. These features include "delicate dermal bones with ornament consisting of continuous anastomosing ridges rather than tubercles, a dorsal trunk shield narrower than long and with a continuous and pronounced dorsal median ridge, and a pre-median plate that is wider than it is long". B. nitida and B. minor are also described from this site.

== Species ==
Vertebrate paleontology is heavily dependent on the ability to differentiate between different species in a way that is consistent both within a particular genus and across all organisms. The genus Bothriolepis is no exception to this principle. Listed below are a few of the notable species within Bothriolepis; more than sixty species have been named in total, and it is likely that a sizeable proportion of them are valid due to the cosmopolitan nature of Bothriolepis.

=== Bothriolepis canadensis ===
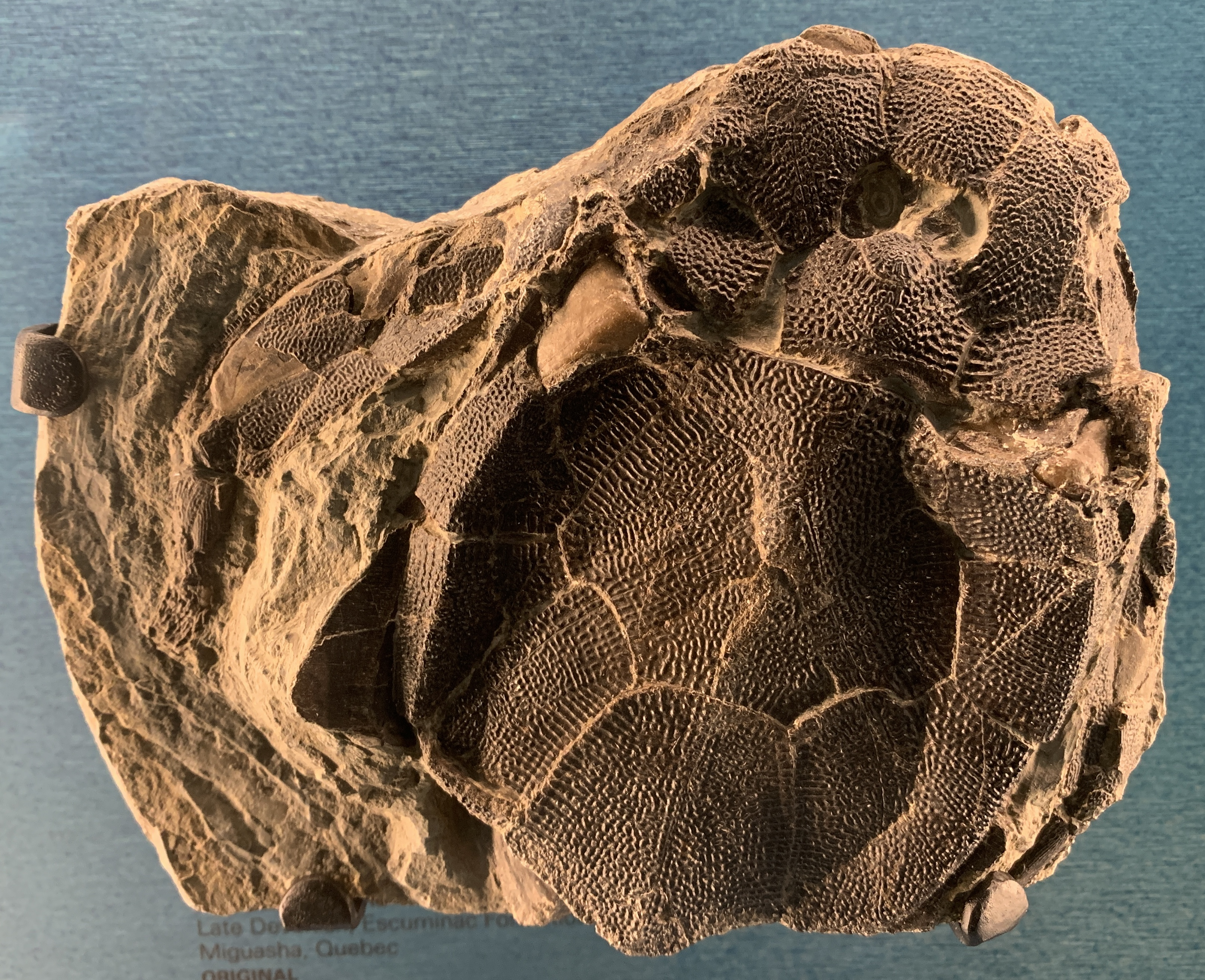
Bothriolepis canadensis. Late Devonian, Escuminac Formation, Quebec (Canada). At the Royal Tyrrell Museum of Palaeontology.

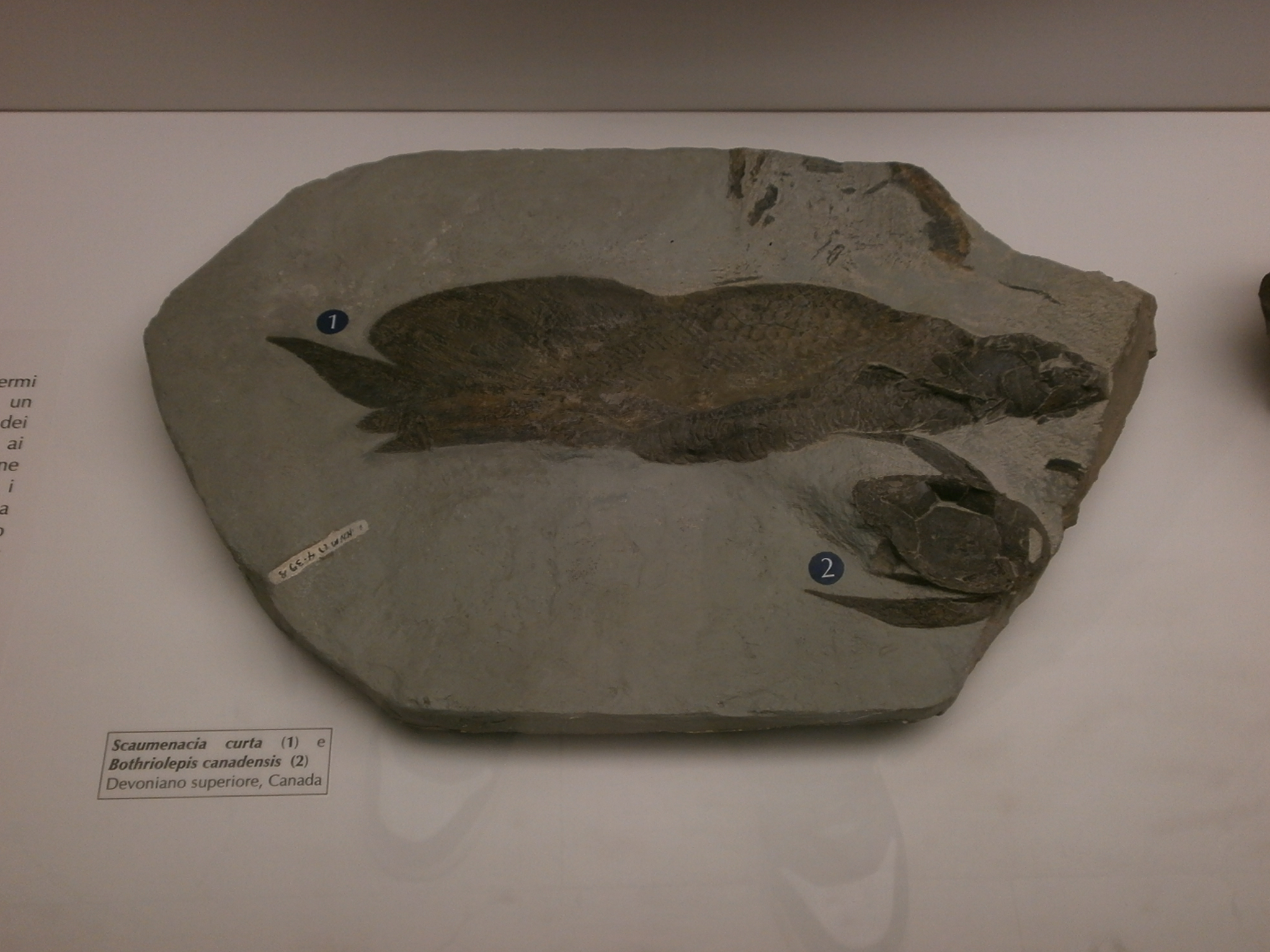
B. canadensis preserved with Scaumenacia cyrta, a prehistoric sarcopterygian

Bothriolepis canadensis is a taxon that often serves as a model organism for the order Antiarchi because of its enormous sample of complete, intact specimens found at the Escuminac Formation in Quebec, Canada. Because of the vast sample size, this species is often used to compare growth data of newly acquired specimens of Bothriolepis, including those found in the Catskill Formation mentioned above. This comparison allows researchers to determine if newly found samples represent juvenile individuals or new "Bothriolepis" species.

B. canadensis was first described in 1880 by J.F. Whiteaves, using a limited number of disfigured samples. The next to propose a reconstruction of the species was W. Patten, who published his findings in 1904 after a discovery of several specimens that were well preserved in 3-D. In 1948, E. Stensio released a detailed depiction of B. canadensis anatomy using an abundance of material, which eventually became the most widely accepted description of this species. Since Stensio's publication, many others have provided reconstructed models of B. canadensis with modified aspects of the anatomy, including Vezina's modified single dorsal fin and more recently, reconstructions by Arsenault et al from specimens with little taphonomic distortion. Presently, the model of Arsenault et al. is regarded to be the most accurate, while there is still much debate about various aspects of this species' external anatomy. Despite the uncertainty, B. canadensis is still classically considered one of the most well-known species.

The external skeleton of Bothriolepis canadensis is made of cellular dermal bone tissue and is characterized by distinct horizontal zonation or stratification. The model fish has an average total length of 43.67 centimetres (17.19 in) and an average dermal armor length of 15.53 centimetres (6.11 in), which accounts for 35.6% of the estimated total length. Like many antiarchs, B. canadensis also had narrow pectoral fins, a heterocercal caudal fin (meaning the notochord extends into the upper lobe of the caudal tail) and a large dorsal fin which likely didn't play an important role in propulsion but instead acted more as a stabilizer.

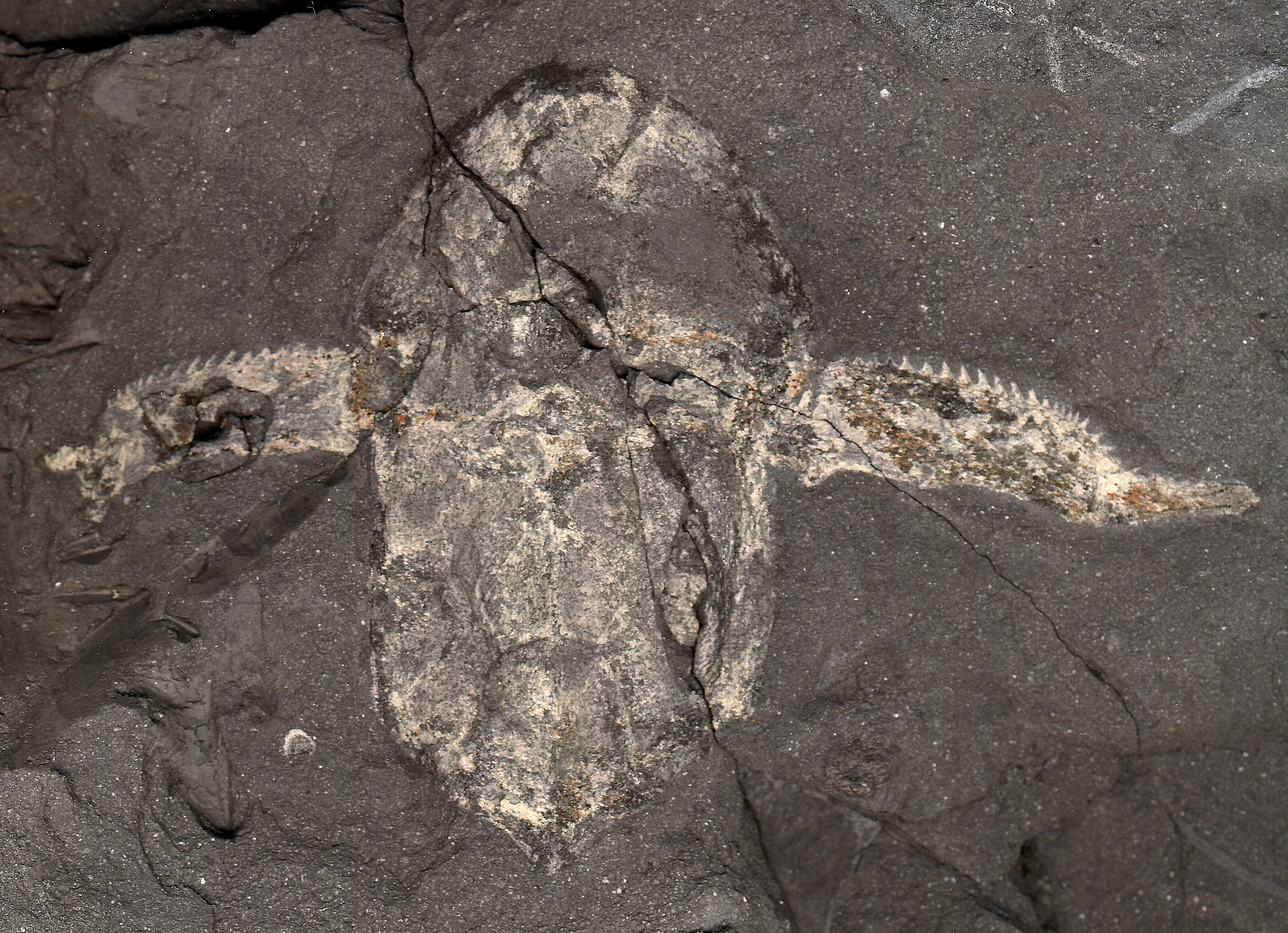
Small (armor length 6 cm) specimen of B. africana.

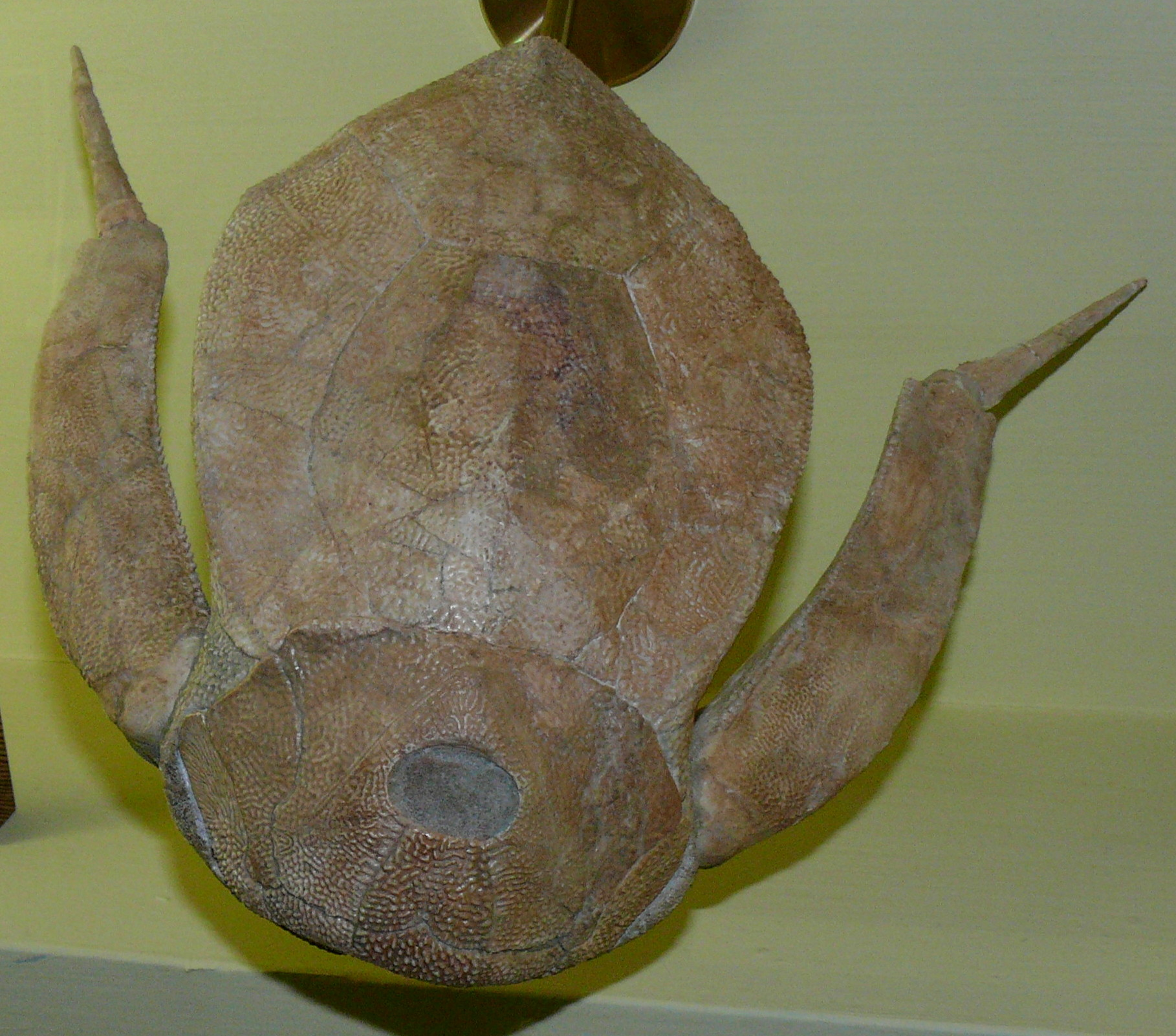
B. panderi fossil from Russia

=== Bothriolepis africana ===
Bothriolepis africana is the Bothriolepis species known from the highest paleolatitude, being described from deposits originally laid down within the Late Devonian Antarctic circle. Remains have exclusively been recovered from a single carbonaceous shale near the top of the Late Devonian, Famennian, Witpoort Formation (Witteberg Group) exposed in a road cutting south of Makhanda/Grahamstown in South Africa. This site, the Waterloo Farm lagerstätte is interpreted as representing a back barrier coastal lagoonal setting with both marine and fluvial influences. Gess observed that Bothriolepis was less abundant at the Waterloo Farm site than at most Bothriolepis-bearing localities, though a full ontogenetic series is represented. The head and trunk armour lengths ranged between 20–300 millimetres (0.79–11.81 in) which translates, based on the proportions of two of the smallest individuals (in which tail impressions are preserved) into full body lengths varying between 52–780 millimetres (2.0–30.7 in). According to original description, Bothriolepis africana was considered to be most closely similar to Bothriolepis barretti from the late Givetian of Antarctica. The similarities between the two have been used to suggest derivation of Bothriolepis africana from an East Gondwanan environment.

=== Bothriolepis coloradensis ===
First described by Eastman in 1904, this species was found localized in present-day Colorado. There is a possibility that this species is similar, if not identical, to B. nitida, however because the material available regarding B. coloradensis is fragmented, it is impossible to compare the two species with any degree of certainty.

=== Bothriolepis nitida ===
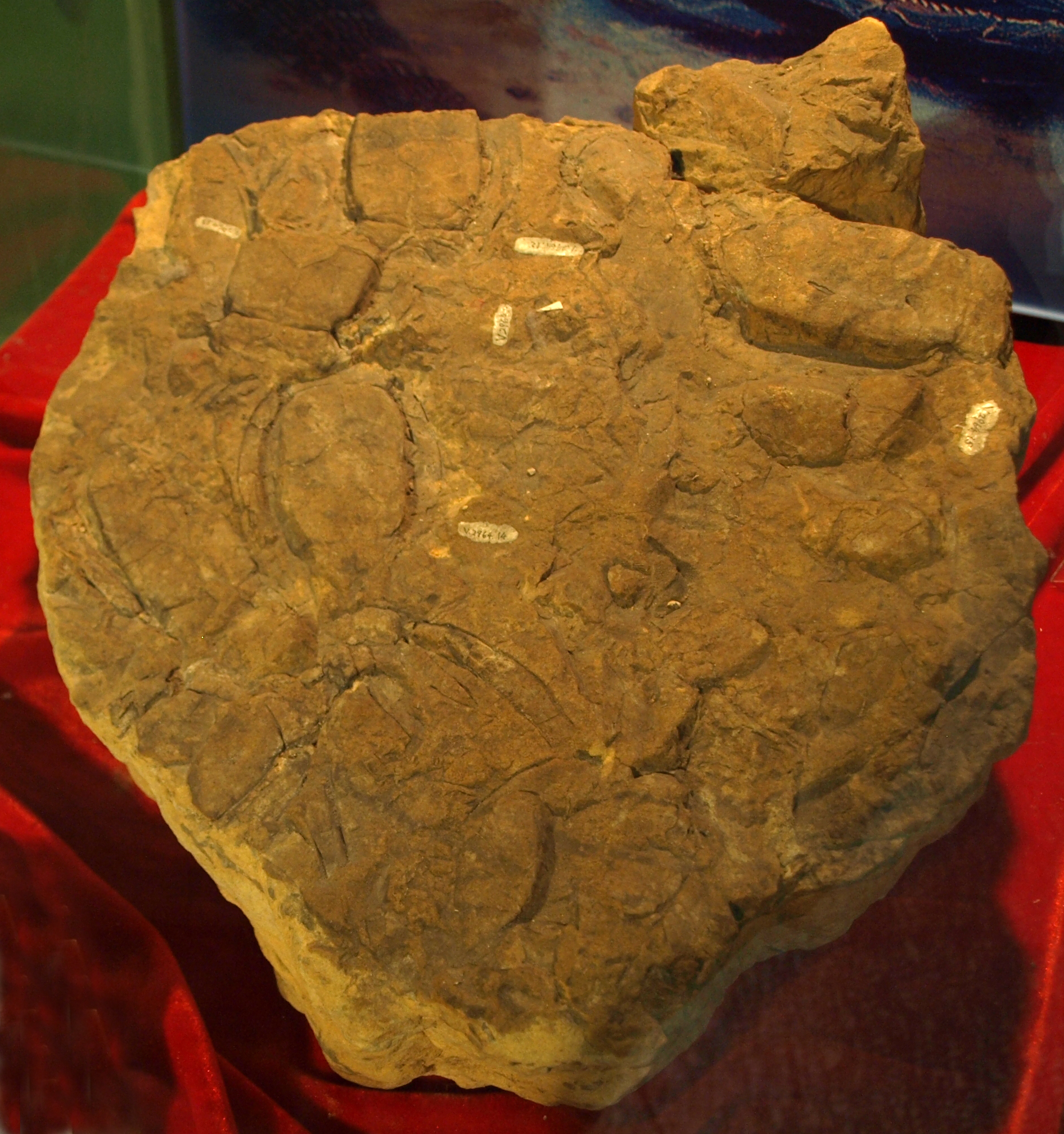
B. tungseni from China

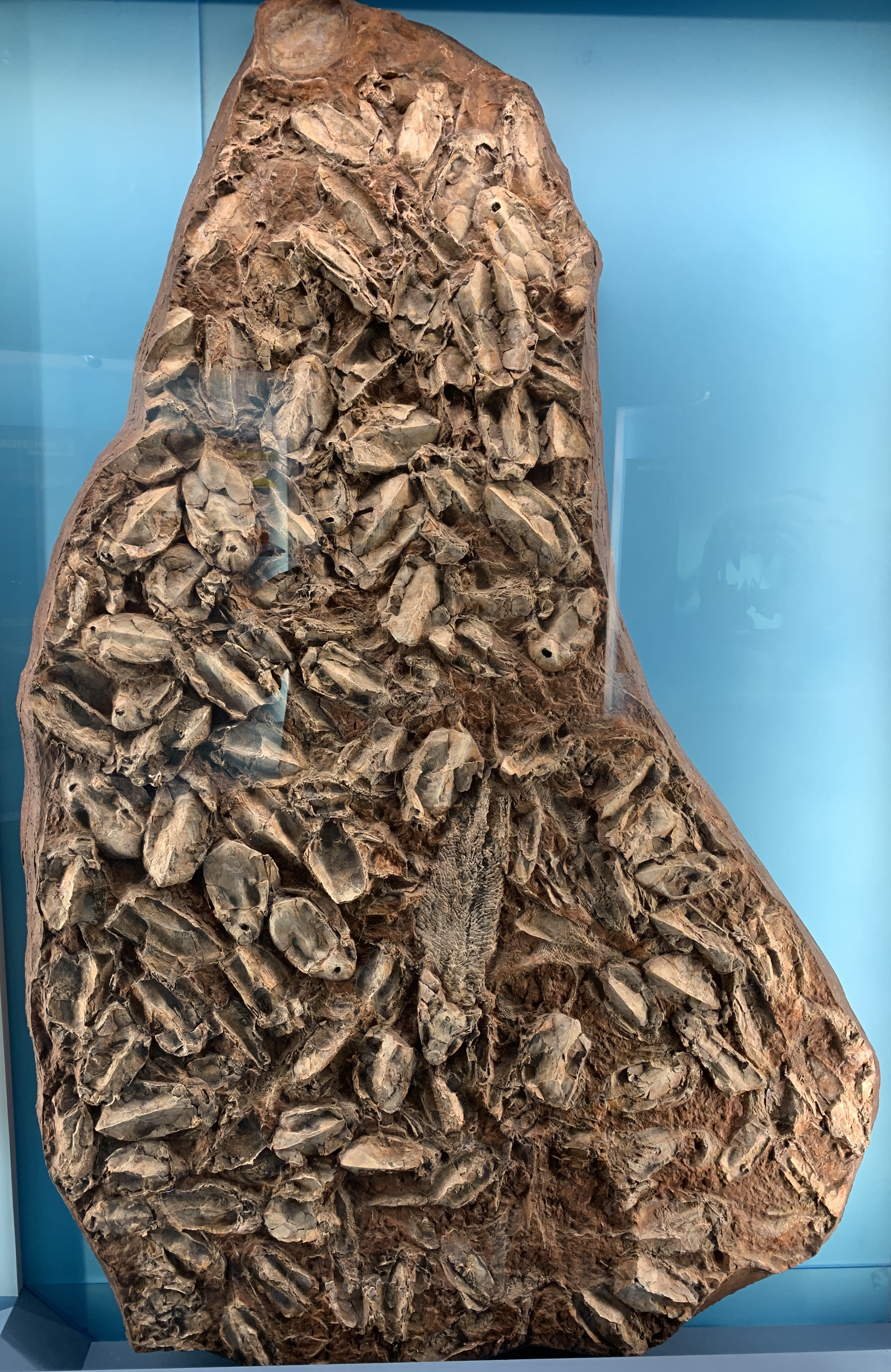
Fossil fish slab, cast. Late Devonian, Mandagery Sandstone, Canowindra, New South Wales (Australia). Preserves 114 fish individuals, which died when their freshwater pond dried up. Most of the individuals in the slab are the antiarch placoderms Remigolepis walkeri and Bothriolepis yeungae. One sarcopterygian individual is present, Canowindra grossi, the largest fish in the slab. Two small and inconspicuous juvenile Groenlandaspis are also preserved.

This species, found in present-day Pennsylvania, was originally described by J. Leidy in 1856. As mentioned above, there is much debate regarding the distinguishability between B. nitida and B. virginiensis, however based on evidence presented by Weems (2004), there are several distinguishable traits specific to each species. B. nitida has a maximum headshield length of 65 millimetres (2.6 in), a narrow and shallow trifid preorbital recess, has an anterior-median-dorsal (AMD) plate that is wider than it is long and a ventral thoracic shield that has convex lateral borders.

=== Bothriolepis rex ===
Originally described by Downs et al. (2016), Bothriolepis rex is from the Nordstrand Point Formation of Ellesmere Island, Canada. B. rex's body length is estimated at 1.7 metres (5.6 ft) and is, therefore, the largest known species of Bothriolepis. Its armor is especially thick and dense even when taking its size into account. Downs et al. (2016) suggest that this may have both protected the animal from large predators and served as ballast to prevent this large bottom-dweller from floating to the surface.

=== Bothriolepis virginiensis ===
Originally described by Weems et al. in 1981, this species, Bothriolepis virginiensis, is from the "Chemung", near Winchester, Virginia. Several traits found in B. virginiensis can also be found in other species of Bothriolepis, (especially B. nitida), including posterior oblique cephalic sensory line grooves that meet relatively far anteriorly on the nuchal plate, relatively elongated orbital fenestra and a low anterior-median-dorsal crest. Characteristics that distinguish B. virginiensis from other species include but are not limited to fused head sutures, fused elements in adult distal pectoral fin segments and long premedian plate relative to headshield length.

Currently, there is much debate regarding whether the species B. virginiensis and B. nitida can actually be distinguished from one another. Thomson and Thomas state that five species of Bothriolepis from the United States (B. nitida, B. minor, B. virginiensis, B. darbiensis and B. coloradensis) are unable to be consistently distinguished from one another. Conversely, Weems asserts that there are several traits that distinguish the species from one another, including several listed above.

=== Bothriolepis yeungae ===
This species is described in 1998, from Mandagery Sandstone in Canowindra, where is known from high numbers of placoderm specimens gathered at one place. Bothriolepis is one of the most common fish in Canowindra site alongside Remigolepis, over 1,300 individuals are discovered by 1998. This species is differed from all other species by having a reduced anterior process of the submarginal, separated from the posterior process of the submarginal by a wide, open notch. The head and trunk armour lengths ranged between 77.6–190 millimetres (3.06–7.48 in).
