= Beatrice Darbyshire =

Australian artist (1901–1988)

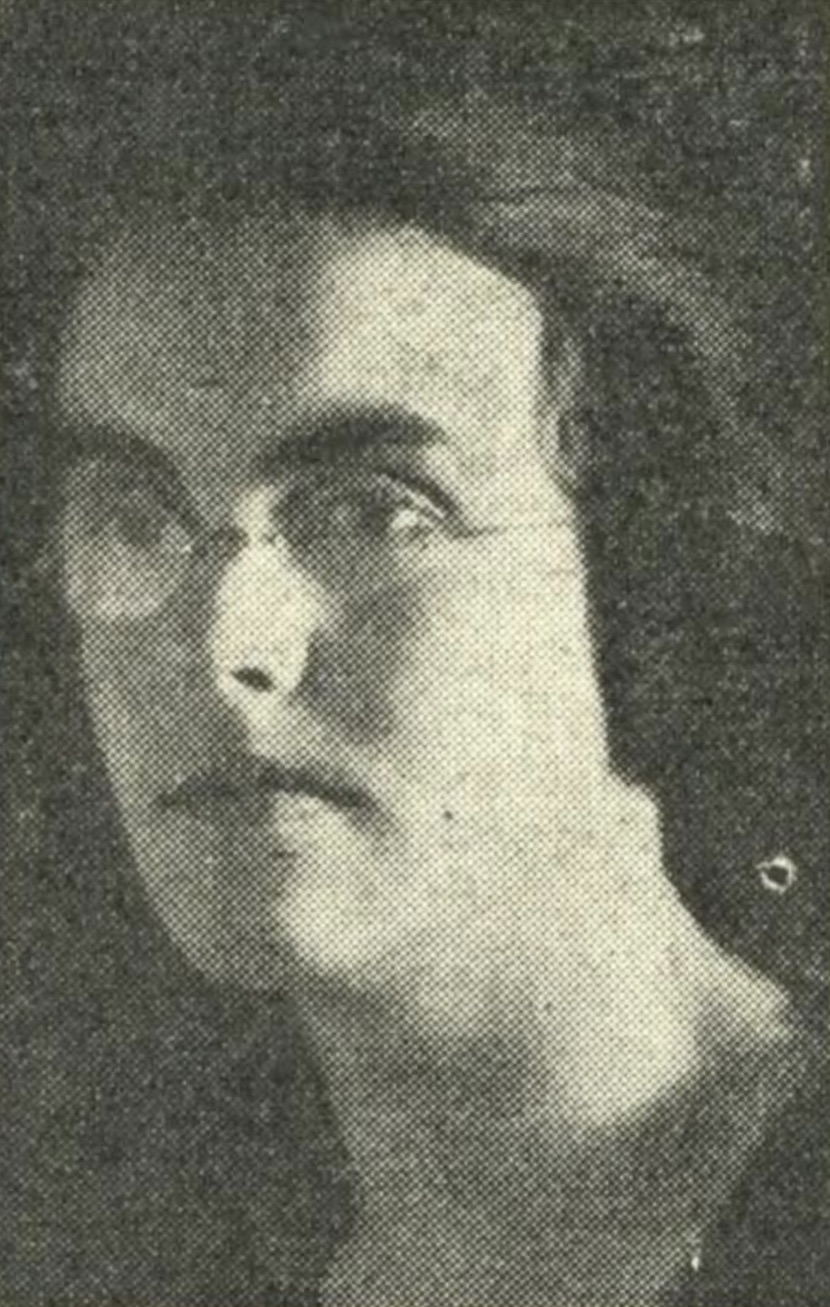
- Darbyshire in 1929
- Born: Beatrice Dean Darbyshire; 31 March 1901; Perth, Western Australia
- Died: 31 July 1988; Mosman Park, Western Australia

Beatrice Dean Darbyshire (31 March 1901 – 31 July 1988) was an Australian artist. She was best known for her etchings, two of which were selected for display at the British Empire Exhibition in 1924 and 1925.

== Early life and education ==
Darbyshire was born in Perth on 31 March 1901, the daughter of Agnes (née Campbell) and barrister Benjamin Harvie Darbyshire. She began her education at Miss Jobson's school in Perth, before attending The Hermitage, an all-girls school in Geelong, Victoria, from 1915 to 1917. She had studied art with Henri Van Raalte in 1913 and 1914, and returned to his tuition after her time in Geelong. Edith Trethowan and Henrietta Jull (better known as writer Henrietta Drake-Brockman) were fellow students.

== Career ==
=== Art ===
Darbyshire's art was first shown publicly at the Art Gallery of Western Australia at an exhibition arranged by the Western Institute of Artists. In 1924, she was encouraged by Van Raalte to sail to London where she studied first at the Slade School of Fine Art, and later at the Royal College of Art, and she graduated as an associate in 1927.

Two of her etchings, The Cowshed, Balingup and In the Blackwood Country, were selected for display at the British Empire Exhibition in London in 1924 and 1925. She had works on show at the University Art Club Exhibition in August 1929, one of which was acquired by the Art Gallery of Western Australia. In 1930, she was one of the Australian artists represented at the British Empire Academy in London.

For The Dawn, she wrote a two-part article, "Etchings", in which she described the process of producing etchings and the work of Durer, Rembrandt and Charles Meryon.

An exhibition, titled Western Australian Printmakers of the 1920s and 1930s, including artworks by Darbyshire, A. B. Webb and Edith Trethowan, was held in Canberra in 1981. In his review, art historian Sasha Grishin wrote that Darbyshire "left a valuable historical record of her time".

Darbyshire's work is held in the collections of the National Gallery of Australia, the Art Gallery of Western Australia, and the Art Gallery of New South Wales.

=== Health ===
In July 1940, Darbyshire left Perth to train as an instructor with the Women's League of Health, run by Thea Stanley Hughes in Sydney. After qualifying, she conducted fitness classes in Sydney and Wollongong, before returning to Perth in 1944. She managed the Western Australian branch of the league for the following 12 years.

== Death ==
Darbyshire died on 31 July 1988 in Mosman Park, Western Australia.
