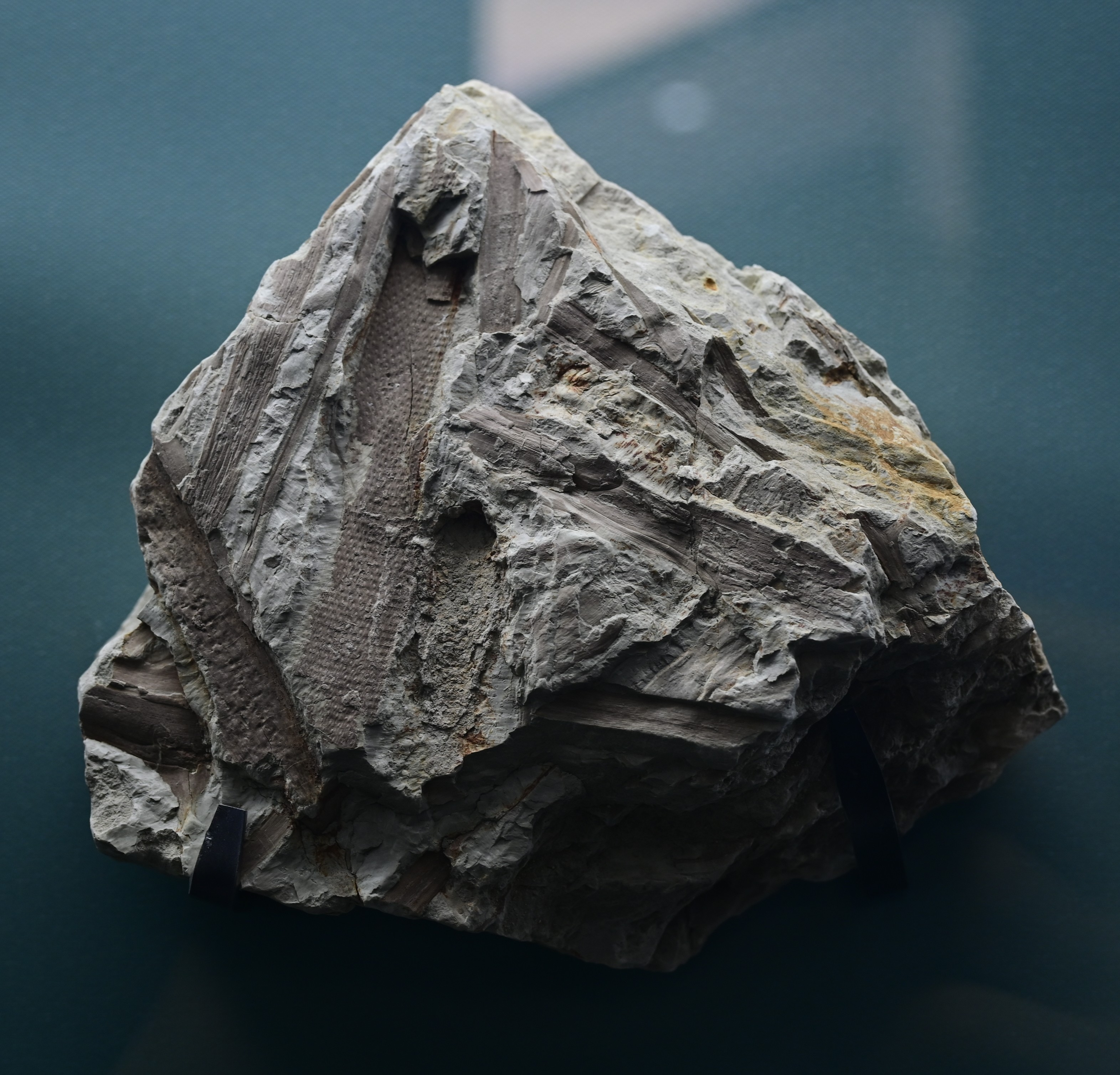
- Fossil specimen, National Natural History Museum of China

Scientific classification
- Kingdom: Plantae
- Clade: Embryophytes
- Clade: Tracheophytes
- Division: Lycopodiophyta
- Genus: †Leptophloeum; Dawson, 1862

Species
- L. rhombicum Dawson, 1862; L. australe Maxwell, 1964

= Leptophloeum =

Extinct genus of plants

Leptophloeum is an extinct genus of vascular plants in the lycophyte clade. It is widely distributed being, known from the Laurasian and Gondwanan settings between the Devonian and Early Carboniferous periods.

== Classification ==
The type species Leptophloeum rhombicum was initially perceived as a Lepidodendron-like arborescent lycopsid with isodichotomous branching systems and stigmarian rhizomorphs. Later in 2005, a new reconstruction based on anatomically preserved material was proposed but this lacked information on the rooting system. This theory highlighted the occurrence of lateral branches on a juvenile stem fragment. As a result, it was suggested that Leptophloeum rhombicum produced “lateral branching systems by pseudomonopodial branching” rather than through isodichotomous divisions. It was further suggested that branching occurred very early in the development and that the branches were ephemeral. However, recent findings do not support this as there was no evidence of either lateral branches or branch scars in the specimens.

== Description ==
According to the current description, based on the three dimensionally preserved remains that were rescued from the Waterloo Farm road cuttings in Makhanda, South Africa, the rhizomorph of L. rhombicum consists of an unlobed, slightly widening base. All rootlets are visible and broken upon leaving the bulbous base of the stem. The base measures 47–55 mm in width and is marginally broader than the stem width. The impression of flaring of the base is enhanced by a slight constriction near the base of the stem. Rootlet scars occur on the upper periphery of the rizhomorph. The rootlet scars are circular in shape and measure between 7 and 8 mm across. The specimens are preserved in three dimension although slightly flattened and represented by inner casts. Rootlets are attached as a dense mass at the bottom of the rizhomorph. The rootlets are between 7.5 and 14 mm wide with the maximum preserved length of a single rootlet being 45 mm. Dispersed rootlets occur within the sediment onto which the specimens are attached.

The leaf base pattern is visible on most specimens but slightly decorticated. The average height of the leaf bases is 7.5 mm and 10 mm wide and is helically arranged. These are, however, variable in size and proportion according to their position on the stem. An oval leaf scar measuring 2.5–3.5 mm in length and 1.0–2.0 mm in width is present around the centre of the leaf base. A ligular pit can be observed between the upper corner of the leaf base and the leaf scar of the best preserved specimens.
