= Ann Darbyshire =

Canadian experimental print-maker (1926–2007)

Ann Darbyshire (1926–2007) was a Canadian experimental print-maker throughout the 1970s and 1980s. Her artwork predominantly focused on the natural world, including insects, plants, animals, landscapes, and often ventured into abstraction and introspection. Darbyshire's residence at the Separate School Board's Holy Rosary School brought the atelier-gallery structure to Ottawa's burgeoning art scene. As an active member of the arts community, she was involved in several artist-run galleries, including the new defunct Ottawa Arts Lending Library.

Darbyshire came to Ottawa from Jamaica to attend the University of Toronto where she met her husband. She had four children and died in 2007. The estate of Ann Darbyshire donated over 100 prints to the City of Ottawa, including etchings, lino-cuts, collotypes, and monotypes.
