= Rhynchodipteridae =

Rhynchodipteridae Temporal range: Devonian–Upper Devonian

Scientific classification
- Kingdom: Animalia
- Phylum: Chordata
- Class: Dipnoi
- Family: †Rhynchodipteridae; Berg, 1940

Genera
- †Jarvikia; †Rhynchodipterus; †Soederberghia

Extinct family of fishes

Rhynchodipteridae is a family of prehistoric lungfishes which lived during the Devonian period.
