= Rhynchodipterus =

Rhynchodipterus Temporal range: Late Devonian

Scientific classification
- Domain: Eukaryota
- Kingdom: Animalia
- Phylum: Chordata
- Clade: Sarcopterygii
- Class: Dipnoi
- Family: †Rhynchodipteridae
- Genus: †Rhynchodipterus; Säve-Söderbergh, 1937

Extinct genus of fishes

Rhynchodipterus is a genus of prehistoric lungfish that lived during the late Devonian period.
