= Mount Darbyshire =

Mountain in Oates Land, Antarctica

Mount Darbyshire (78°28′S 158°5′E) is a prominent bare rock mountain 2,100 metres (6,900 ft) high, which stands close west of the Warren Range in Victoria Land. It was mapped by the United States Geological Survey from surveys and from U.S. Navy aerial photographs, 1956–61, and named by the Advisory Committee on Antarctic Names for Major Leslie L. Darbyshire, United States Marine Corps, a pilot with U.S. Navy Squadron VX-6, 1960–61 and 1961–62.
