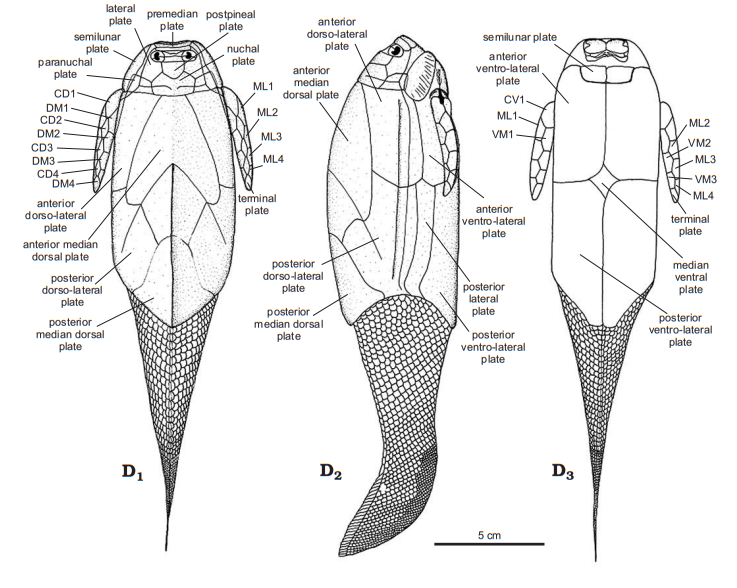
- Reconstruction of R. walkeri
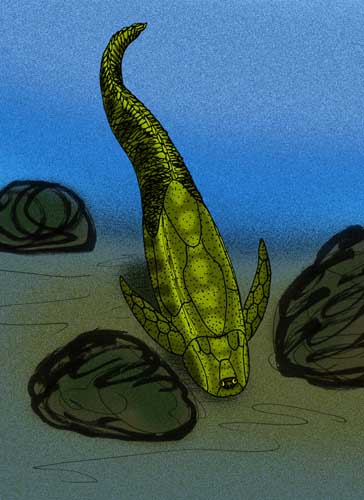
- Reconstruction of R. zhongweiensis

Scientific classification
- Kingdom: Animalia
- Phylum: Chordata
- Class: †Placodermi
- Order: †Antiarchi
- Family: †Remigolepidae
- Genus: †Remigolepis; Stensiö, 1931

Type species
- †Remigolepis incisa (Woodward, 1900)

Other species
- †R. acuta Stensiö, 1931; †R. armata Lukševičs, 1991; †R. cristata Stensiö, 1931; †R. durnalensis Olive, 2015; †R. karakoliensis Panteleyev, 1992; †R. kochi Stensiö, 1931; †R. kullingi Stensiö, 1931; †R. major Pan in Pan et al. 1987; †R. microcephala Pan et al. 1987; †R. redcliffensis Johanson, 1997; †R. suusamyrensis Panteleyev, 1992; †R. tuberculata Stensiö, 1931; †R. walkeri Johanson, 1997; †R. xiangshanensis Pan et al. 1987; †R. xixiaensis Pan et al. 1987; †R. zhongningensis Pan et al. 1980; †R. zhongweiensis Pan et al. 1987

= Remigolepis =

Remigolepis Temporal range: Late Devonian

Extinct genus of fishes

Remigolepis is a genus of antiarch placoderm from Devonian. Species are described from East Greenland, China, Tula region of Russia, Kyrgyzstan, Australia, Belgium. In addition, indeterminate remains are known from Old Red Sandstone in Scotland.

== Description ==
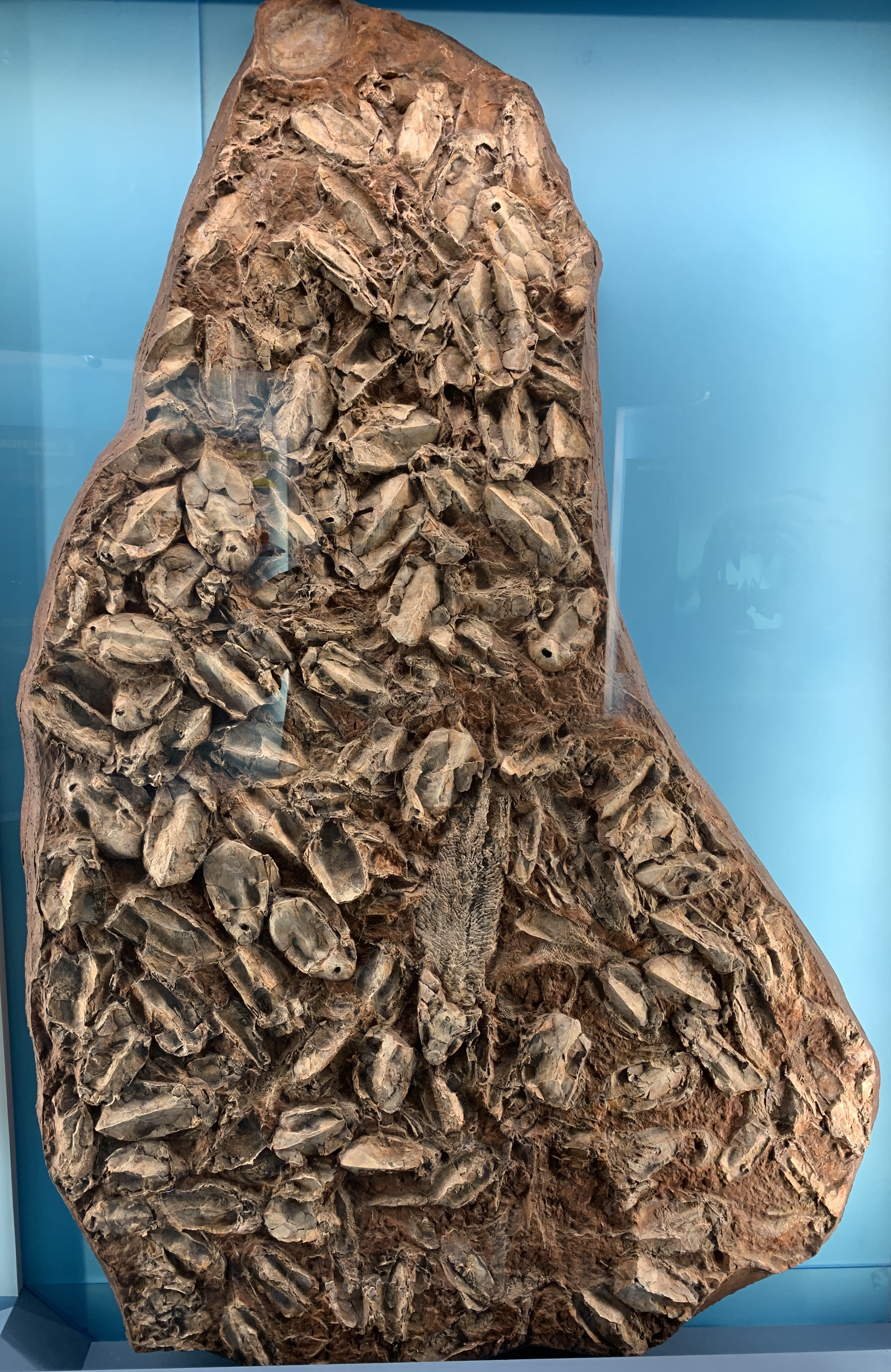
Slab from Mandagery Sandstone including many specimens of R. walkeri and Bothriolepis yeungae

Remigolepis is a member of Asterolepidoidei, and it is considered as a sister taxon of Pambulaspis, while next most closely related genus is Asterolepis. R. walkeri from Mandagery Sandstone, Canowindra, New South Wales is known from over 1,000 specimens which shield length ranging between 7.8–18.5 centimetres (3.1–7.3 in). While other Late Devonian antiarchs like Bothriolepis and Asterolepis lacked pelvic fins and had single dorsal fin, Remigolepis lacked both of pelvic and dorsal fins.
