= Wise Peak =

Mountain peak in Oates Land, Antarctica

Wise Peak (78°35′S 158°18′E) is a small peak (1,580 m) marking the south end of Warren Range in Oates Land. Named by Advisory Committee on Antarctic Names (US-ACAN) for Keith A.J. Wise, biologist working out of the McMurdo Station for five seasons, 1960–61 to 1964–65.
