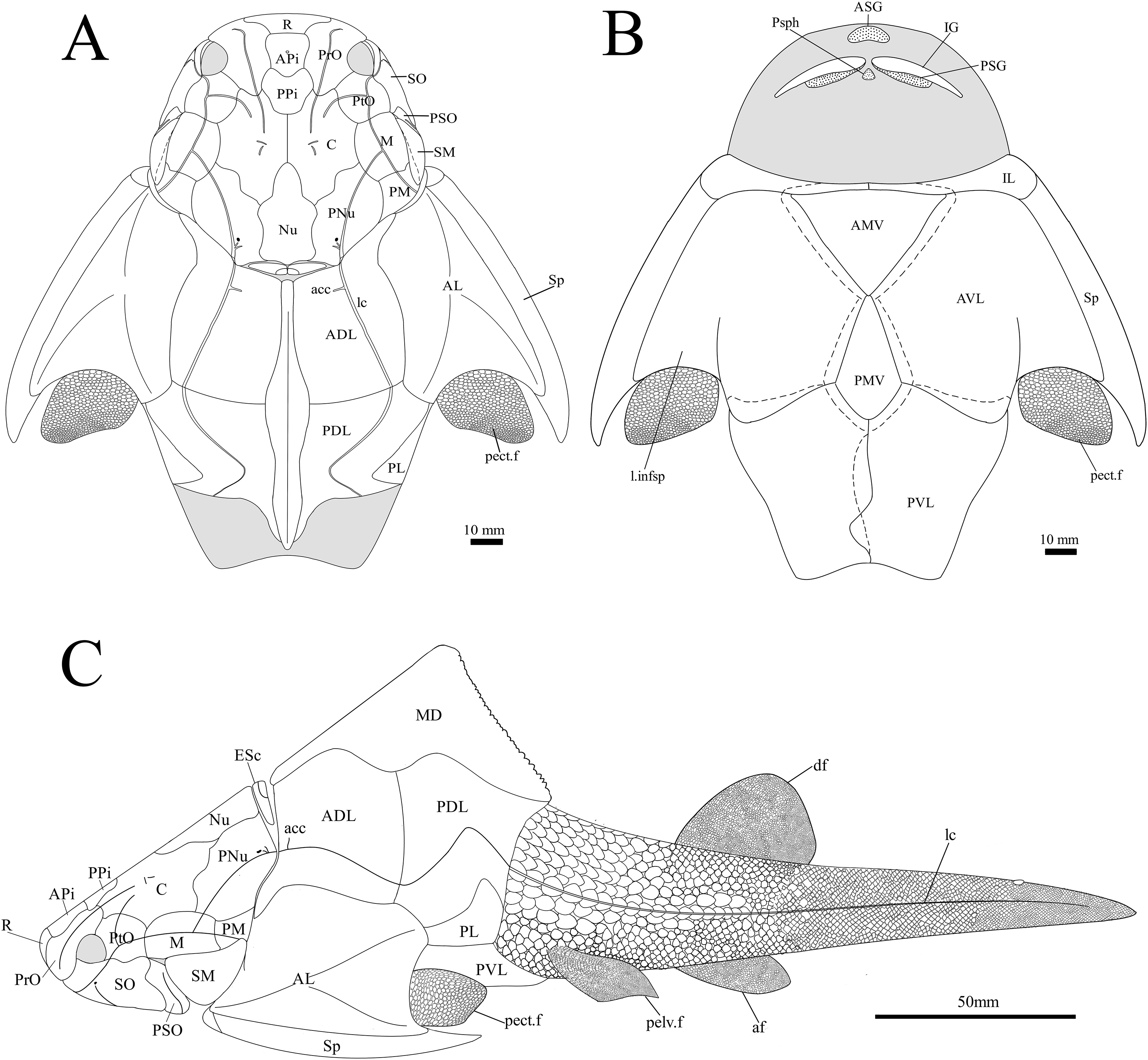
- G. howittensis reconstruction
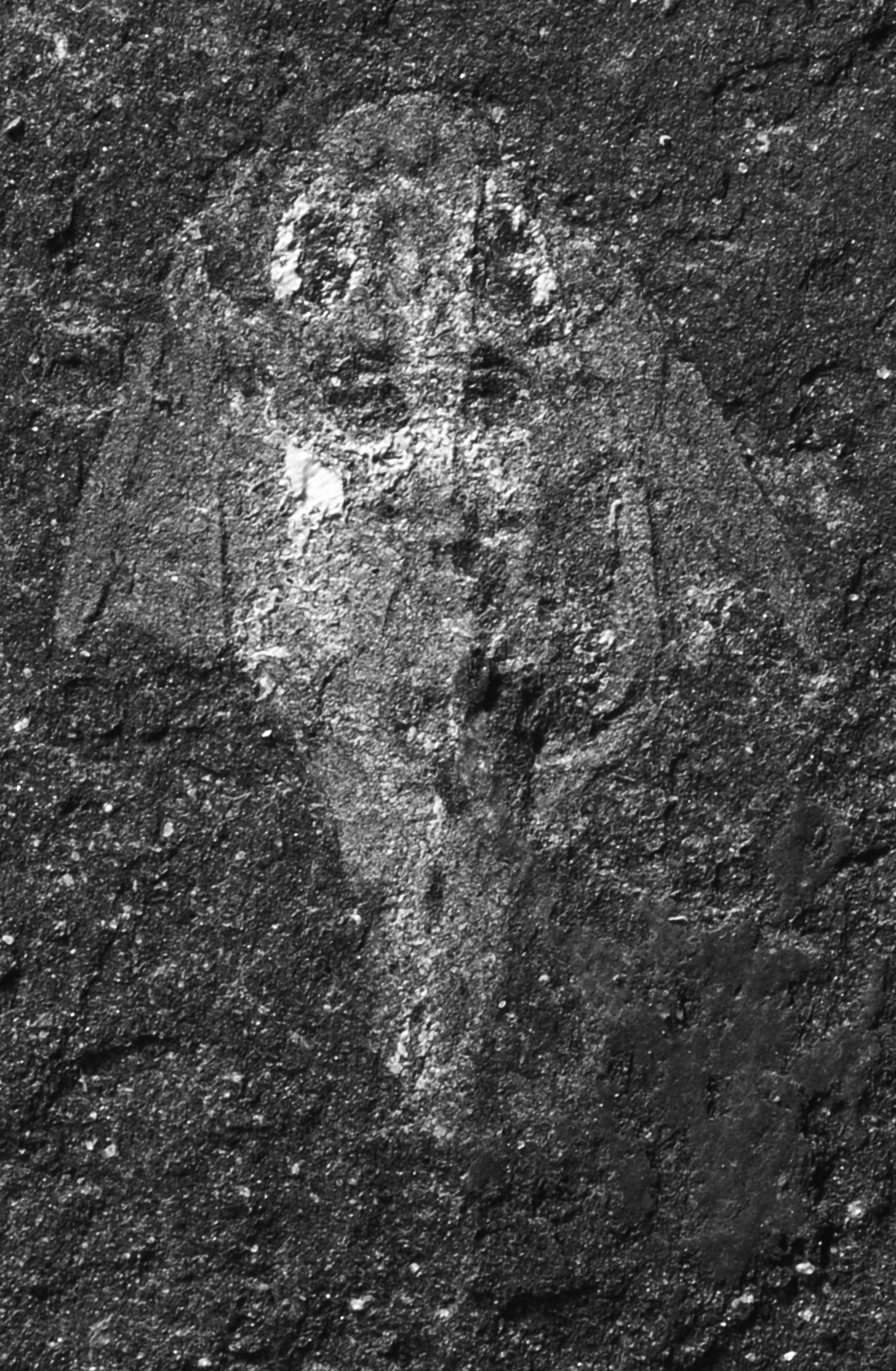
- Hatchling fossil of G. riniensis

Scientific classification
- Kingdom: Animalia
- Phylum: Chordata
- Class: †Placodermi
- Order: †Arthrodira
- Family: †Groenlandaspididae
- Genus: †Groenlandaspis; Heintz, 1932

Type species
- Groenlandaspis mirabilis Heintz, 1932

Other species
- G. pennsylvanica Daeschler et al., 2003; G. antarctica Ritchie, 1975; G. riniensis(Gess and Hiller, 1995); G. disjectus (Woodward, 1891) (originally Coccosteus disjectus); G. potyi Olive et al., 2015; G. seni Janvier, P. and A. Ritchie. 1977; G. thorezi Heintz, 1932; G. howittensis Fitzpatrick, Clement & Long, 2024

= Groenlandaspis =

Groenlandaspis Temporal range: Late Devonian

Genus of fishes (fossil)

Groenlandaspis is an extinct genus of arthrodire from the Late Devonian. Fossils of the different species are found in late Devonian strata in all continents except eastern Asia. The generic name commemorates the fact that the first specimens of the type species were found in Greenland.

== Description ==
G. antarctica illustration

As with all other arthrodires, Groenlandaspis had a joint in the back of its head with its thoracic armor, allowing for its head to be thrown back, increasing its gape. However, as its head is somewhat compressed in comparison with many other arthrodires, and as the dorsal side came to a low, pyramid-like peak, it is believed that Groenlandaspis could not crane its head back very far. It was a relatively small fish, only 7.5 centimetres (3.0 in) in length on average, though one unusually large species, G. riniensis, reached almost a meter in length. It lived in coastal and fluvial waters, where it is thought to have fed on either very small prey, or detritus; the small dental plates in its mouth strongly suggest that it was incapable of tackling large prey. The possibility that the plates may have been used to, at times, feed on bivalves has also been muted.

The body shape of the largest species G. riniensis suggests that it was most likely a benthic fish. The presence of crushing tooth plates in the form of flat, noded infragnathals and superagnathals suggest that the species' diet may have included prey with hard external shells such as molluscs, crustaceans or arthropods. The armor length of G. riniensis, according to the original description, was approximately 40 cm (15.7 in), with the head shield having a very broad marginal plate and narrow pineal plate, with the nuchal relatively narrow, being approximately half as broad as it is long. The trunk shield of this species was characterized as having an anterior lateral plate which is almost as broad as long with a relatively straight anterior margin; the median dorsal plate is low with an apex that is posteriorly directed; its posterior dorsolateral plate is very narrow with inflexion of the main lateral line canal situated very close to posterior margin. This species has ornamentation of widely spaced, coarse tubercles. G.pennsylvanica is estimated at 40 centimetres (16 in) in length.

=== Colouration ===
Groenlandaspis is unusual among placoderms in that it is known what color it was; preserved pigment cells in its fossils indicate that its posterior was red and its anterior was silvery-white in a countershaded pattern, camouflaging it in the murky, silty waters of the rivers in which it dwelled.

== Species ==
- †G. mirabilis Heintz, 1932
- †G. antarctica Ritchie, 1975
- †G. riniensis Gess and Hiller, 1995
- †G. disjectus (Woodward, 1891)(originally Coccosteus disjectus)
- †G. pennsylvanica Daeschler et al., 2003
- †G. potyi Olive et al., 2015
- †G. seni Janvier and Ritchie, 1977
- †G. thorezi Heintz, 1932

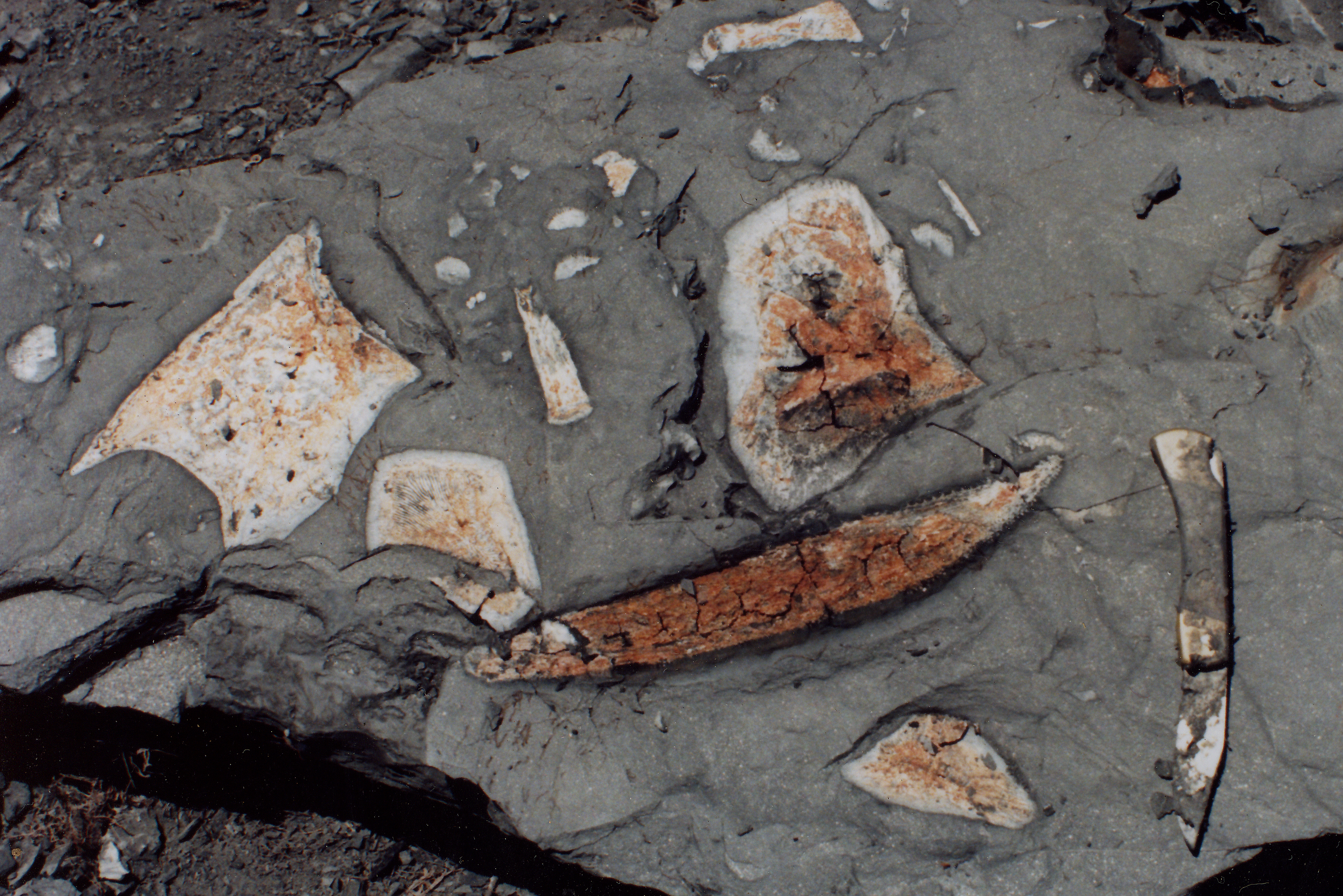
A scatter of dissassociated adult Groenlandaspis riniensis trunk armour plates at the Waterloo Farm lagerstätte (anteriolateral at left, posterior dorsolateral at right (both upside down) and large elongate spinal towards the bottom).

Groenlandaspis riniensis is one of two arthrodire placoderms described in 1999 from the Waterloo Farm lagerstätte in South Africa, with a third species having been subsequently described. The species name 'riniensis' derived from Rini or Rhini, the traditional isiXhosa name for Makhanda/Grahamstown, making it the first ever vertebrate fossil to have an isiXhosa derived scientific name. G. riniensis appears to have spent its entire life cycle within the Waterloo Farm estuary as it is represented by a full ontogenetic series. Evidence from other Late Devonian localities with similar placoderm taxa which suggest that while many larvae or small juveniles stayed in the littoral zone close to adult habitats, others may have moved upriver to avoid predation. G. riniensis represents the most frequently preserved fish taxon from the Waterloo Farm site, and may have been the most common vertebrate within the palaeoenvironment, though its frequent preservation may be influenced by preservational bias.
