= Xitun Formation =

Geological formation in Yunnan, China

- Stratigraphic range: Early Devonian (Lochkovian)
- Type: Geological formation
- Unit of: Cuifengshan Group
- Underlies: Guijiatun Formation
- Overlies: Xiaxishancun Formation

Lithology
- Primary: Calciferous mudstones

Location
- Coordinates: 25°29.853'N and 103°46.309'E
- Region: Yunnan Province
- Country: China
- Extent: Qujing

Type section
- Named for: Xitun village

The Xitun Formation is a palaeontological formation which is named after Xitun village in Qujing, a location in South China. This formation includes many remains of fossilized fish and plants of the Early Devonian period (Late Lochkovian). It was originally referred to as the Xitun Member of the Cuifengshan Formation (now the Cuifengshan Group).

== Fossil content ==
Color key: Taxon / Reclassified taxon / Taxon falsely reported as present / Dubious taxon or junior synonym / Ichnotaxon / Ootaxon / Morphotaxon	Notes; Uncertain or tentative taxa are in small text; ~~crossed out~~ taxa are discredited.

=== Animals ===
==== Acanthodians ====
Acanthodians reported from the Xitun Formation
Genus	Species	Presence	Material	Notes	Images
Ischnacanthidae	Genus indet.	Qujing.	4 isolated scales (V7218.1, 3, 6 & 8) & 2 longitudinal sections (V7218.4 & 7).	Similar to Ischnacanthus & Acanthodes, may be referrable to Youngacanthus.	
Nostolepis	N. amplifica	Xitun, Xishan subdistrict, Qujing.	43 trunk scales.		
Nostolepis	N. consueta	Xitun, Xishan subdistrict, Qujing.	Around 25 trunk scales.		
Nostolepis	N. digitus	Xitun, Xishan subdistrict, Qujing.	28 trunk scales.		
Nostolepis	N. qujingensis	Xitun, Xishan subdistrict, Qujing.	19 trunk scales.		
Nostolepis	N. striata	Xitun, Xishan subdistrict, Qujing.	69 trunk scales.		
Nostolepis	N. sp. indet.	Qujing.	Body scales.		
Youngacanthus	Y. gracilis	Qujing.	Jaw elements & teeth.	An ischnacanthid.	

==== Actinopterygians ====
Actinopterygians reported from the Xitun Formation
Genus	Species	Presence	Material	Notes	Images
Meemannia	M. eos	Xitun village, Qujing.		An early ray-finned fish, formerly thought to be a lobe finned fish.	

==== Arthropods ====
Arthropods reported from the Xitun Formation
Genus	Species	Presence	Material	Notes	Images
Qujingopterus	Q. spineus			A stylonurid eurypterid	

==== Chondrichthyes ====
Chondrichthyes reported from the Xitun Formation
Genus	Species	Presence	Material	Notes	Images
Changolepis	C. tricuspidus	Qujing.	10 scales of various growth stages.		
Chondrichthyes	Genus indet.	Qujing.	4 isolated teeth (V7221.1, 2, 3 & 4).	May belong to Gualepis or Changolepis.	
Gualepis	G. elegans	Xitun, Qilin district, Qujing.	Thousands of isolated scales.		
Ohiolepis?	O.? xitunensis	Qujing.	A complete scale (V7233.1) & an incomplete scale (V7223.2).		
Peilepis	P. solida	Qujing.	A body scale (V7222).		

==== Jawless fish ====
Jawless fish reported from the Xitun Formation
Genus	Species	Presence	Material	Notes	Images
Parathelodus	P. asiaticus	Qilin district, Qujing.	Body scales.	A thelodont also known from the Xishancun Formation.	
Parathelodus	P. cornuformis	Qilin district, Qujing.	Body scales.	A thelodont also known from the Xishancun Formation.	
Parathelodus	P. liaokuoensis	Qilin district, Qujing.	Body scales.	A thelodont also known from the Xishancun Formation.	
Parathelodus	P. scitulus	Qilin district, Qujing.	A complete body scale (IVPP V 12156.1).	A thelodont also known from the Xishancun Formation.	
Parathelodus	P. trilobatus	Qilin district, Qujing.	Body scales.	A thelodont also found in the Xishancun Formation.	
Parathelodus	P. wangi	Qilin district, Qujing.	Body scales.	A thelodont also known from the Xishancun Formation.	
Parathelodus	P. xitunensis	Qilin district, Qujing.	A complete body scale (IVPP V 26113.1).	A thelodont.	
Turinia	T. asiatica	Qujing.	Multiple scales.	A thelodont.	
Xitunaspis	X. magnus	Qujing.	4 headshields.	A galeaspid.	

==== Placoderms ====
Placoderms reported from the Xitun Formation
Genus	Species	Presence	Material	Notes	Images
Antiarchi	Unnamed antiarch	Qujing.	MNHN-CHD02 & V10515.	Originally referred to ?Xichonelepis.	
Asterosteidae	Gen. et. sp. indet.	Qujing.	Part of the head shield.	Very similar to Gemuendina.	
Chuchinolepis	C. gracilis	Qujing.	Detached plates.	A chuchinolepidid also known from the Xishancun Formation.	
Chuchinolepis	C. qujingensis		Plates.	A chuchinolepidid also known from the Xishancun Formation.	
Chuchinolepis	C. robusta	Qujing.	A detached AVL plate (V10512).	A chuchinolepidid.	
Chuchinolepis	C. sulcata	Qujing.	Trunkshield, plates & incomplete pectoral fin.	A chuchinolepidid.	
Cuanyu	C. liui	Qujing.		A actinolepid.	
Gavinaspis	G. convergens	Qujing.	Skull remains.	A phyllolepid.	
Parayunnanolepis	P. xitunensis		Almost-complete specimen.	A yunnanolepidid.	
Phymolepis	P. cuifengshanensis	Cuifengshan and Liaokuoshan, Qujing.	Plates.	A yunnanolepidid also known from the Xishancun Formation.	
Phymolepis	P. guoruii	Qujing.	Trunk-shields & plates.	A yunnanolepidid.	
Szeaspis	S. yunnanensis	Qujing.	Neurocranium & associated skull roof (IVPP V 5810a-b).	Preoccupied genus name, renamed Szelepis.	
Szelepis	S. yunnanensis	Qujing.	Neurocranium & associated skull roof (IVPP V 5810a-b).	An actinolepid originally named Szeaspis.	
Yunnanolepis	Y. porifera	Qujing.		A yunnanolepidid also known from the Xishancun Formation.	
Yunnanolepis	Y. sp.	Qujing.	A trunk-shield associated with part of skull roof (V10514).	A yunnanolepidid, specimen formerly assigned to Vanchienolepis.	
Zhanjilepis	Z. aspratilis	Qujing.	Plates.	A yunnanolepidid also known from the Xishancun Formation.	

==== Sarcopterygians ====
Sarcopterygians reported from the Xitun Formation
Genus	Species	Presence	Material	Notes	Images
Achoania	A. jarvikii	Qujing.	Anterior cranial portion.	A basal lobe finned fish.	
Diabolepis	D. speratus	Xichong, Qujing.	Multiple specimens.	A dipteriform originally named Diabolichthys.	
Psarolepis	P. romeri	Xichong, Qujing.	4 anterior cranial portions, a posterior cranial portion, 2 complete lower jaws & an incomplete lower jaw.	A basal lobe finned fish.	
Styloichthys	S. changae	Qujing.	Multiple specimens.	A basal coelacanth.	
Youngolepis	Y. praecursor		Numerous specimens.	A basal lobe finned fish also known from the Bac Bun Formation.	

=== Plants ===
Plants reported from the Xitun Formation
Genus	Species	Presence	Material	Notes	Images
Gen. nov. A		Huaguo Hill, Shengfeng district of Qujing city.	Numerous specimens.		
aff. Huia	aff. H. sp.	Huaguo Hill, Shengfeng district of Qujing city.	PKU-XH214.	A lycophyte.	
Unnamed spike		Huaguo Hill, Shengfeng district of Qujing city.	A poorly preserved terminal spike (PKU-XH215a, 215b).	Probably from a zosterophyll.	
Xitunia	X. spinitheca	Qujing.		A zosterophyll.	
Zosterophyllum	Z. minorstachyum	Qujing.		A zosterophyll.	
Zosterophyllum	Z. shengfengense	A building site at Huaguo Hill, Shengfeng District, Qujing City.	A nearly entire individual plant preserved as a compression (PUH-QXI01-1), and its counterpart (PUH-QXI01-1').	A zosterophyll.	

== See also ==
- List of fossil sites— (with link directory)
