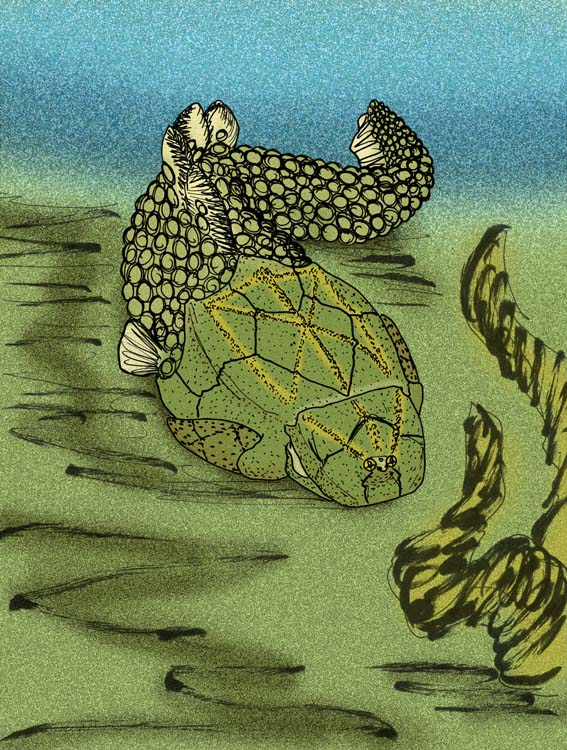
- Artist's reconstruction

Scientific classification
- Kingdom: Animalia
- Phylum: Chordata
- Class: †Placodermi
- Order: †Antiarchi
- Family: †Yunnanolepididae
- Genus: †Vukhuclepis; Janvier, Thanh, Phuong & Truong, 1997
- Species: †V. lyhoaensis

Binomial name
- †Vukhuclepis lyhoaensis Zhu, 1996

= Vukhuclepis =

Vukhuclepis Temporal range: Early Devonian

Vukhuclepis lyhoaensis is an extinct, primitive antiarch placoderm. Specimens are of mostly complete thoracic armor from the Early Devonian Ly Hoa Formation in Vietnam. The armor is very similar to that of Yunnanolepis, but is distinguished by a unique pattern of raised ridges radiating from a point at the center of the dorsal shield of the thoracic armor. A similar, albeit more floral-looking pattern is seen in the Chinese Mizia. V. lyhaoensis' armor is further ornamented with small tubercles.
