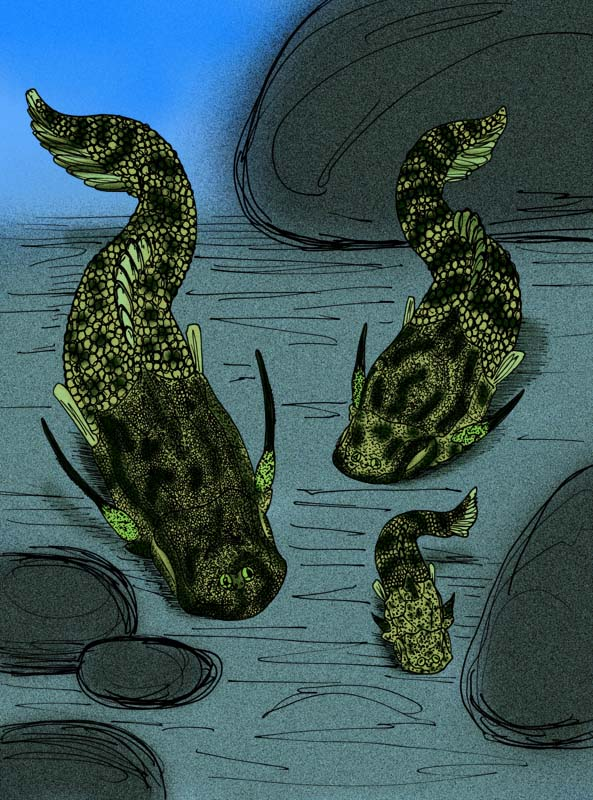
- Reconstruction of M. lirouyii adult and juveniles

Scientific classification
- Kingdom: Animalia
- Phylum: Chordata
- Class: †Placodermi
- Order: †Antiarchi
- Genus: †Minicrania; Zhu and Janvier, 1996

Type species
- Minicrania lirouyii Zhu and Janvier, 1996

Species
- M. lirouyii; M. lissa Janvier and Phuong, 1999

= Minicrania =

Minicrania Temporal range: Lochkovian

Extinct genus of fishes

Minicrania ("small skull") is an extinct genus of tiny antiarch fish, with armor averaging up to about 2 centimetres (0.79 in) long, which lived during the Lochkovian epoch in Early Devonian Yunnan Province, China and northern Vietnam.

Anatomically, Minicrania bears a strong resemblance to the Yunnanolepiformids (i.e., Yunnanolepis and Chuchinolepis). However, other anatomical features, especially the head-width ratios, separate it from the Yunnanolepiformids. Zhu and Janvier regard it as the sister taxon of the sinolepids and the Euantiarchi (i.e., the bothriolepids and the asterolepids), representing a transitional form between the Euantiarchi and the more primitive Yunnanolepiformids.

There are two recognized species. The type species, M. lirouyii, is found in Lochkovian-aged strata in Qujing, Yunnan, and is characterized by the presence of numerous tubercles covering the dermal surface of the armor. The specific name honors a Mr. Li Rou-yi, who assisted in collecting the first specimens. The second species, M. lissa, is found in Lochkovian deposits in northern Vietnam, near the Chinese border. M. lissa's tubercles are comparatively very small and ill-defined, if present, hence the specific epithet "lissa" meaning "smooth." Otherwise, the armor is very similar, if not identical to that of M. lirouyi.
