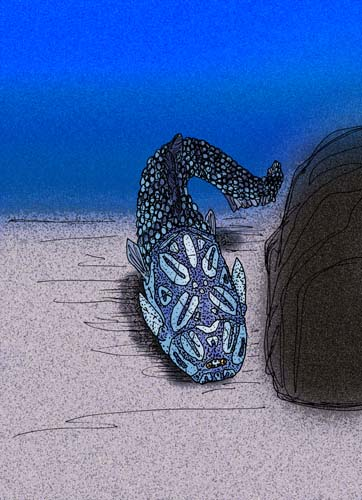
- M. longhuaensis

Scientific classification
- Domain: Eukaryota
- Kingdom: Animalia
- Phylum: Chordata
- Class: †Placodermi
- Order: †Antiarchi
- Family: †Yunnanolepididae
- Genus: †Mizia

Type species
- Mizia longhuaensis Zhu, 1996

Species
- M. longhuaensis Zhu, 1996; M. parvus (Zhang Guorui 1978)

Synonyms
- Yunnanolepis parvus Zhang Guorui 1978

= Mizia =

Mizia Temporal range: Emsian

Extinct genus of fishes

Mizia is a genus of primitive antiarch placoderm found in Emsian-aged marine strata of Early Devonian China.

== Species ==
=== Mizia longhuaensis ===
The only known specimen is of a mostly complete thoracic armor from the Xujiachong Formation in Qujing, Yunnan. The armor is very similar to that of Yunnanolepis, but is distinguished by a unique floral pattern of raised ridges and grooves radiating from a point at the center of the dorsal shield of the thoracic armor. A similar pattern is seen on the thoracic armor of the Vietnamese Vukhuclepis. M. longhuaensis' armor is further ornamented with small tubercles.

=== Mizia parvus ===
Originally described as Yunnanolepis parvus. Min Zhu reexamined specimens of Y. parvus, and found the armor, in addition to being rather different from the armor seen in Yunnanolepis, to be more anatomically similar to the holotype of M. longhuaensis, and placed it into Mizia.
