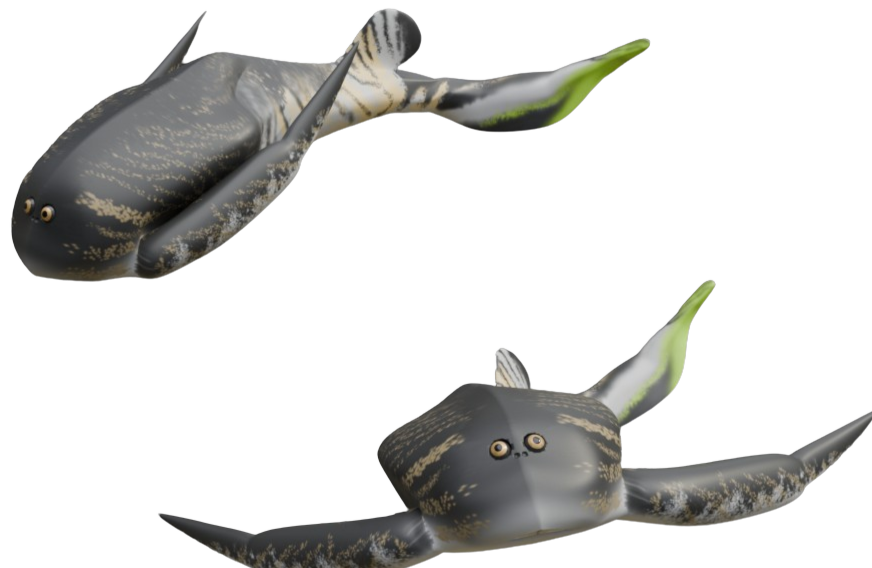
- Bothriolepis, a member of the family Bothriolepididae
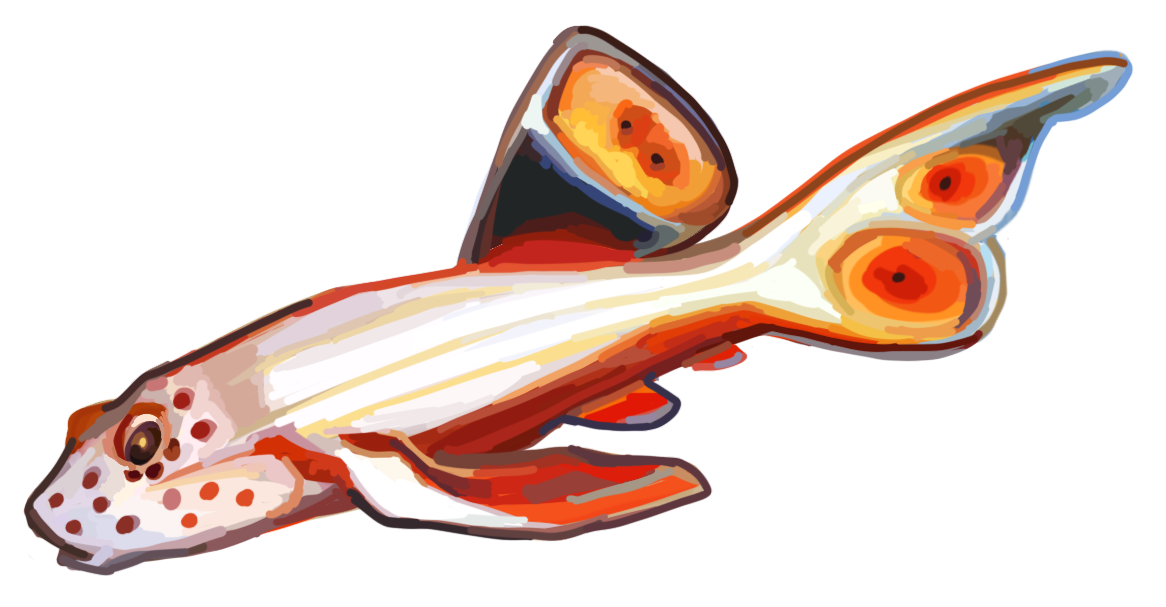
- Wufengshania, from the same family.

Scientific classification
- Kingdom: Animalia
- Phylum: Chordata
- Class: †Placodermi
- Order: †Antiarchi
- Clade: †Euantiarcha
- Suborder: †Bothriolepidoidei; Miles, 1968

Genera
- †Bothriolepis; †Dianolepis; †Grossilepis; †Hohsienolepis; †Houershanospis; †Jiangxilepis; †Microbrachius; †Monarolepis; †Tenizolepis; †Vietnamaspis; †Wudinolepis; †Wufengshania

= Bothriolepidoidei =

Bothriolepidoidei Temporal range: Emsian to Famennian 407.6–358.9 Ma

Extinct suborder of placoderm fishes

Bothriolepidoidei is a suborder of antiarch placoderm fishes. The group is considered paraphyletic.

== Taxonomy ==
The cladogram is taken from Bothriolepid antiarchs (Vertebrata, Placodermi) from the Devonian of the north-western part of the East European Platform.

- Bothriolepidoidei
  - - Microbrachius
    - Wudinolepis
  - - - Dianolepis
      - Jiangxilepis
      - Kirgisolepis
      - Tenizolepis
    - - Monarolepis
      - - Bothriolepis
        - Grossilepis
        - Vietnamaspis
