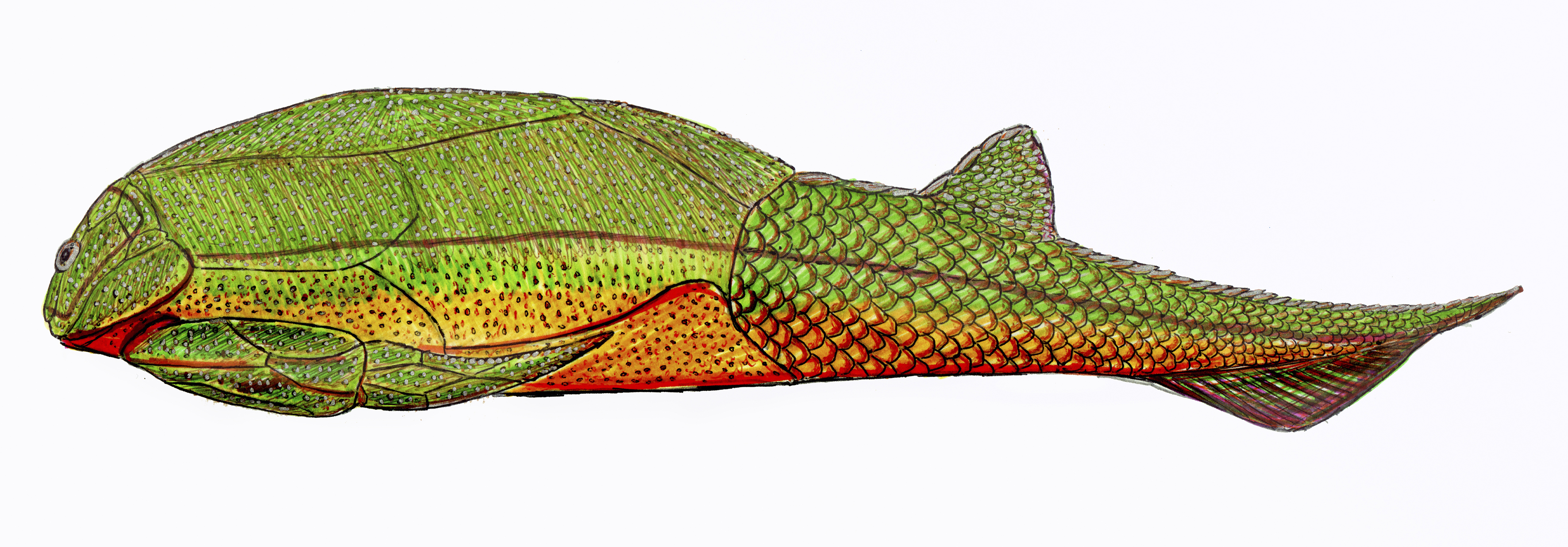
- Reconstruction of Asterolepis ornata

Scientific classification
- Kingdom: Animalia
- Phylum: Chordata
- Class: †Placodermi
- Order: †Antiarchi
- Family: †Asterolepididae
- Genus: †Asterolepis; Eichwald, 1840

Species
- See text

Synonyms
- Astrolepis Eichwald, 1840; Chelonichthys Agassiz, 1844

= Asterolepis (fish) =

Asterolepis Temporal range: Middle to Late Devonian

Extinct genus of fishes

Asterolepis is an extinct genus of antiarch placoderms from the Devonian of North and South America and Europe. They were heavily armored flat-headed benthic detritivores with distinctive jointed limb-like pectoral fins and hollow spine. The armor plate gives the Asterolepis a box-like shape. Its pectoral fins are also armored but the caudal and dorsal fin are not. The first fossils were named by M. Eichwald in 1840 after noticing star-like markings on the fossils.

== Etymology ==
"Aster-" means star while "-lepis" means scales. Confusion surrounded the first fossils discovered of this genus, as naturalists were unable to ascertain their place among fishes. In 1844, another author named this same genus Chelonichthys. Later very fine specimens were found in the Old Red Sandstone of Russia and Professor Asmus of Dorpat sent them to the British Museum, noticing fossils exhibited star-like markings. That is when the name Chelonichthys was recognized as a synonym for Asterolepis which Eichwald proposed.

== Description ==
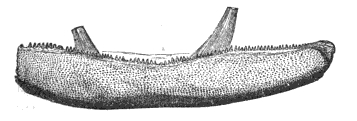
Asterolepis lower jaw

Reconstruction of Asterolepis dermal skeleton

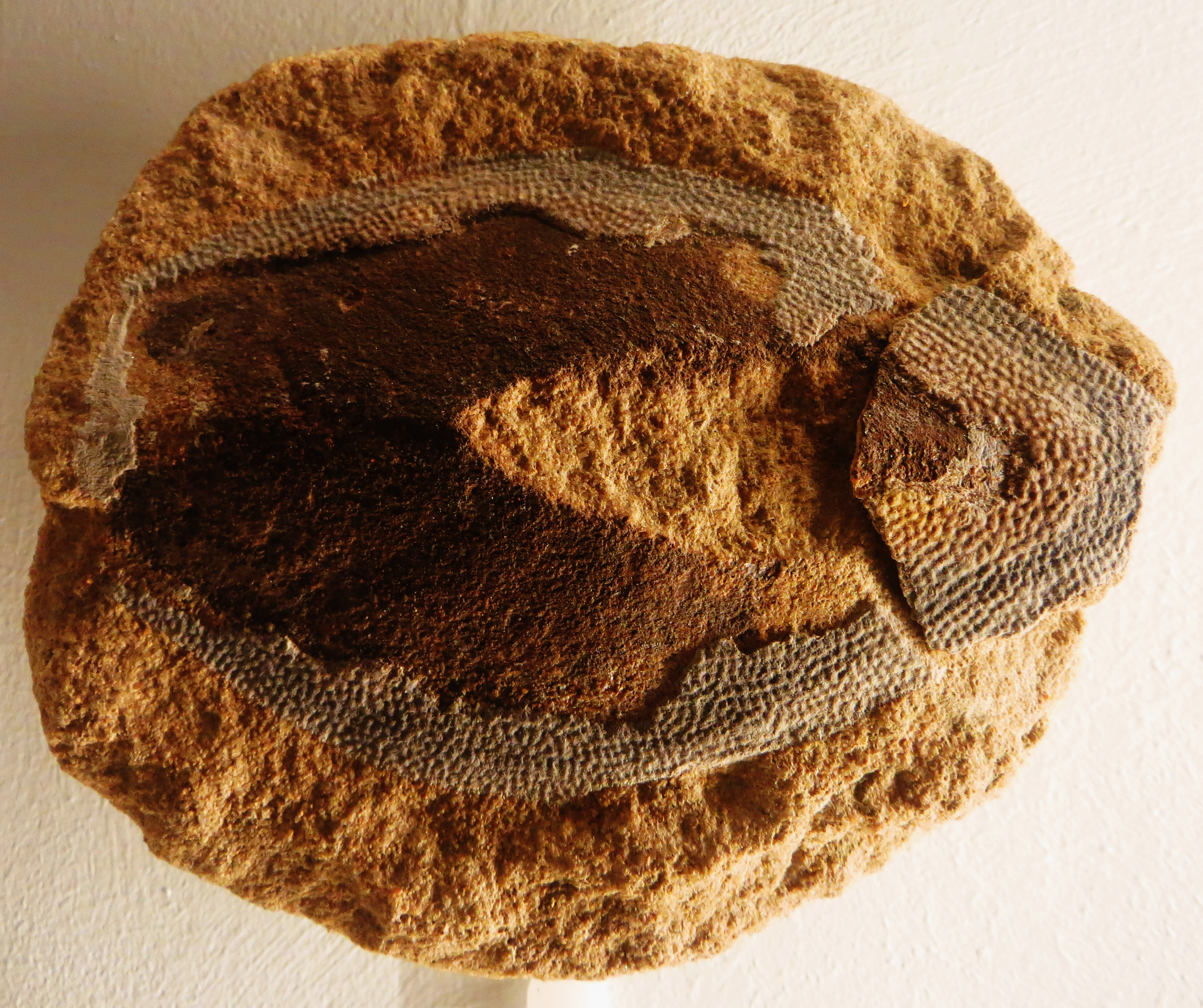
Fossil of Asterolepis maxima

Primitive features such as jaw ossifications, a palatoquadrate, and a Meckel's cartilage are present in the Asterolepis that are important features shared between antiarchs and other Gnathostomata. Additionally the Asterolepis has box-like dermal armour covering the head and thorax with highly modified pectoral fins that are enclosed in interlocking dermal plates protecting a cartilaginous endocranium and gill region. Also, the vertebral column and the pectoral girdle are cartilaginous. The Asterolepis does not have an anal fin or pelvic fins. However it does have a caudal and dorsal fin. Both are covered in similar scales.

=== Armour plates ===
The Asterolepis has multiple interlocking dermal plates that form its body armour; anterior ventro-lateral (AVL) plate, posterior lateral plate, posterior ventro-lateral (PVL) plate, anterior median dorsal (AMD) plate, two anterior dorsolateral (ADL) plates, two mixilateral plates, and one posterior median dorsal (PMD) plate. The area considered to be the face is also armored with interlocking dermal plates; nuchal plate, paired paranuchal plate, paired postmarginal plate, postpineal plate, premedian plate, paired lateral plate, and semilunar plate. The cheek region of the head shield is formed by three bones: prelateral, opercular/ sub-marginal, and infraprelateral plates where the prelateral and submarginal plates form the lateral region and the infraprelateral plates form the ventral region The paired pectoral fins are also plated with plates of the dorsal central series (CD1-CD4), plates of the medial marginal series (MM1-MM4), and the plates of the lateral marginal series (ML1-ML4).

The postpineal plate is broader than longer. The premedian plate is thickens as you move posterior. The posterior wall of the premedian plate concaves to form the anterior wall of the orbito-nasal cavity and shows prerostral process. The pineal plate is small, trapezoidal, thin bone that covers the most posterior part of the orbito-nasal cavity. It has a rough ornamented surface and a smooth visceral surface that has a round pineal pit. Also, rough postero-ventro-laterally facing processes in the antero-lateral projections of the plate are present.

The medial marginal plate 4 of the pectoral fin displays short spaced spines that go lateral which are absent on the distal part of the plate. The posterior of this plate is narrow unlike the anterior part that is flat and large. The dorsal central plate 1 of the pectoral fin is long and the external dorsal articular area that is anterior to the unornamented area, is finely covered with tiny meshes The distal segment of the pectoral fin armour was shorter than the proximal segment and formed by 13 bones: the third, fourth, and fifth bones of the central dorsal row, central ventral row, middle marginal row, lateral marginal row, and the terminal. These bones were small, elongated, and hexagonal with the external surface usually ridged. The proximal region of the pectoral fins had articular surfaces covered with narrow grooves.

=== Surface sculpturing of bones ===
The surface ornamentation on the nuchal plate is tuberculated and on the AVL plate, the ornamentation is tuberculated as there are tubercles that are arranged in parallel rows. On the postpineal plate some tubercles fuse to form small ridges and some of these radiate from the center of the plate. The middle pit-line groove is well marked and connected to the supratemporal pit-line groove, in turn linked to an external openings for the endolymphatic duct. Asterolepis is part of the family Asterolepididae which was characterized by tuberculated surface sculpturing. The organization of the small tubercles were in random arrangement, arranged in radial rows that were sometimes positioned on low crests, or was absent from the majority of the bones. This was only seen in Asterolepis syasiensis where surface sculpturing was absent except on the anterior mediodarsal where relatively low tubercles were present at the anterior margin while the rest of the bone surface was smooth.

=== Orbito-nasal cavity ===
The internasal wall of the rostral plate connects the ventral, anterior, and dorsal walls in order to divide the nasal sacs which are relatively small. The nasal sacs are bound between the rostral plate and the rhinocapsular section of the cartilaginous endocranium and are placed some distance from the telencephalon and opened antero-dorsally. They are located posterior to the nares which were located in the anterior part of the nasal sacs. The structure of the orbito-nasal cavity in the Asterolepis ornata has been studied, providing a detailed description of the premedian, rostral, and pineal plates, and bones of the scleral ring. The orbito-nasal fenestra is positioned in the middle of the head shield, leaning more towards the anterior end and is usually spectacle-shaped. Eyes are enclosed within the scleral capsule and the nasal cavities open directly above the head of the fish. The visceral surface of the scleral ring is smooth and bears small pores and pits. The scleral ring is open wide ventrally and the scleral capsule consists of three fine plates, scleral bones one through three (anterior, medial, and lateral). At the Lode Quarry, Latvia, two specimens of Asterolepis ornata were found to have a fossa deep in the orbital fenestra that is treated to be the hypophysial foramen.

The Asterolepis is blind and eyes and nostrils are directed antero-latero-dorsally. Water would reach the nasal sacs directly through the nostrils and exit the sacs laterally along the anterior process of the scleral ring. The tail is covered ganoid scales like the armour which are modified cosmoid scales consisting of a bony basal layer, a layer of dentine, and an outer layer of ganoine. Since the tail doesn't have a high degree of mineralization in comparison to the scales of the internal skeleton making then less likely to be preserved in the fossil record. The tail is also has a dorsal fin, which is an identifying characteristic of Antiarchs.

=== Juvenile Asterolepis features ===
The medioventral bone, located at the center of the ventral wall of the armor, is absent form the trunk shield at early developmental stages of the Asterolepis ornata. In juvenile Asterolepis found at the Lode Quarry, Latvia, the caudal region was covered with very small, rounded scales. The central row of the distal segment in the pectoral fins of juvenile Asterlepis ornata are fused together unlike their adult counterparts.

== Taxa ==
Asterolepis chadwiki remains were found in the lower part of the Upper Devonian continental Kataberg Formation in Sullivan County, New York. These remains were the first record of the Asterolepis in North America. The discovery of A. chadwiki extended the stratigraphic and geographic range of this characteristically Middle Devonian fish by occurring in the middle of the Senecan Series or middle Frasnian. The Asterolepis of Stromness is believed to be the oldest organism discovered in the most ancient geological system of Scotland.

Several species within the genus have been described: Asterolepis concatenata, Asterolepis maximus, Asterolepis ornata, Asterolepis verrucosa, Asterolepis estonica, Asterolepis chadwiki, Asterolepis cornutus, Asterolepis dellei, Asterolepis essica, Asterolepis radiata, and Asterolepis sysasiensis.

Asterolepis has two sister taxa, Microbrachium and Pterichthys. Both sister taxa are also carnivores and Pterichtyhs is similarly blind.

== Stratigraphic formations ==
Taxa considered to be sisters to Asterolepis are Microbrachium and Pterichthys.

In the Blue Fiord Formation of Canada (Nunavut), A. sp was discovered and dated to be from the Eifelian period. At the Mikhailovskii Mine, Zheleznogorsk, of the Russian Federation, fossils of A. radiata, A. syasiensis, A sp. and A ornata, were dated to be from the Lower Frasnian. They were found in beds of sandstone, and clay strata with no other faunal remains, underlying Middle Jurassic formations. The depositional environment of the sediments from the Mikhailovskii Mine was lagoonal. The lithology comprised a combination of poorly lithified gray/blue claystone and black argillaceous sandstone. In Armagh, United Kingdom, A. verrucosa was discovered in marine limestone and dated to around the Mississippian. Fossils of Asterolepis have also been found in the Cuche Formation, Boyacá, Colombia.

== See also ==
- Bothriolepis
- List of placoderms
