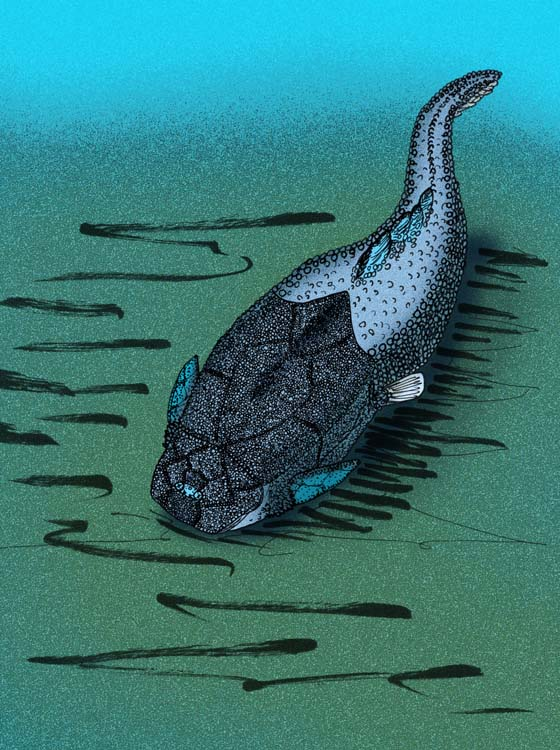
- Zhanjilepis aspartilis

Scientific classification
- Domain: Eukaryota
- Kingdom: Animalia
- Phylum: Chordata
- Class: †Placodermi
- Order: †Antiarchi
- Family: †Yunnanolepididae
- Genus: †Zhanjilepis

Type species
- Zhanjilepis aspartilis Junqing, 1991

= Zhanjilepis =

Zhanjilepis Temporal range: Late Pridoli–Lochkovian

Extinct genus of fishes

Zhanjilepis aspartilis is an extinct yunnanolepid placoderm from Pridoli and Lochkovian rocks of Hunan, China. Zhanjilepis is known only from distinctively ordered plates.

== Description ==
=== Plates ===
Zhanjilepis plates are very similar to the Late Llandovery yunnanolepid Shimenolepis, also known from distinctively ornamented plates.
