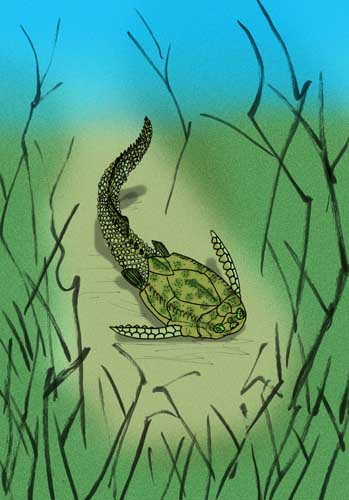
- Artist's reconstruction

Scientific classification
- Kingdom: Animalia
- Phylum: Chordata
- Class: †Placodermi
- Order: †Antiarchi
- Family: †Yunnanolepididae
- Genus: †Parayunnanolepis
- Species: †P. xitunensis

Binomial name
- †Parayunnanolepis xitunensis Zhang et al. 2001

= Parayunnanolepis =

Parayunnanolepis Temporal range: Early Devonian, Lochkovian

Extinct genus of fishes

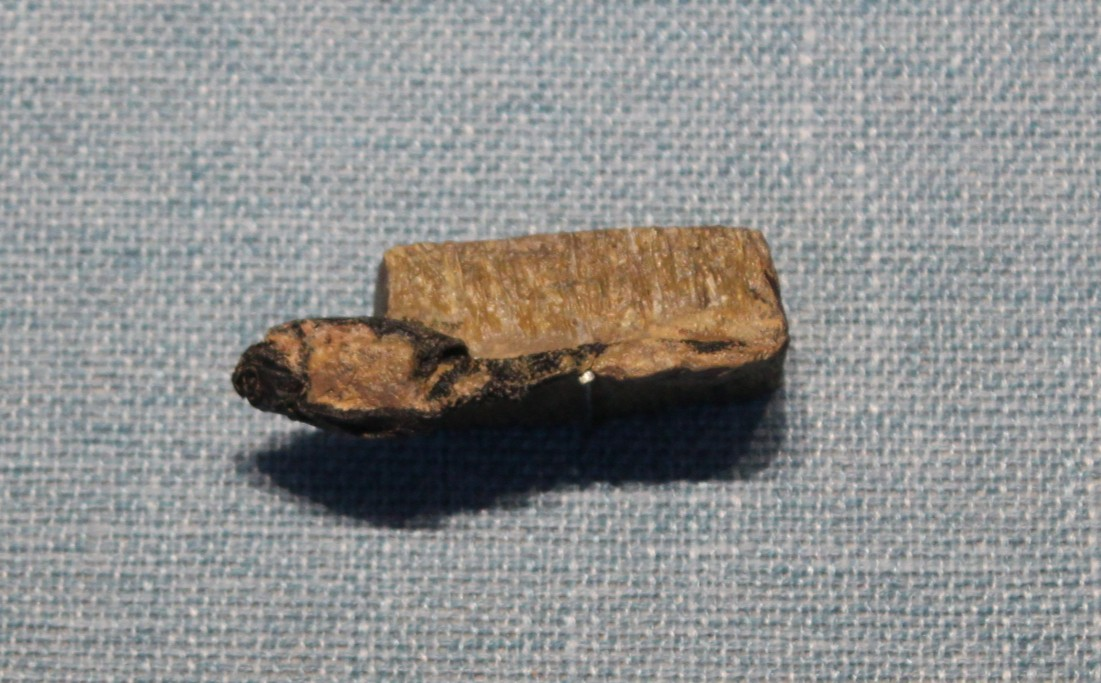
Fossil specimen, Baoding Natural History Museum

Parayunnanolepis xitunensis is an extinct, primitive antiarch placoderm. The fossil specimens, including a marvelously preserved, intact specimen, are known from the Lochkovian Epoch-aged Xitun Formation of Early Devonian Yunnan. The armor is very similar to that of Yunnanolepis, but is distinguished by being comparatively more flattened.

An intact and exquisitely preserved specimen demonstrates that the living animal had pelvic fins and a pelvic girdle, thus proving that antiarchs had, primitively at least, pelvic girdles, and or inherited them from a common ancestor of both placoderms and other gnathostomes.
