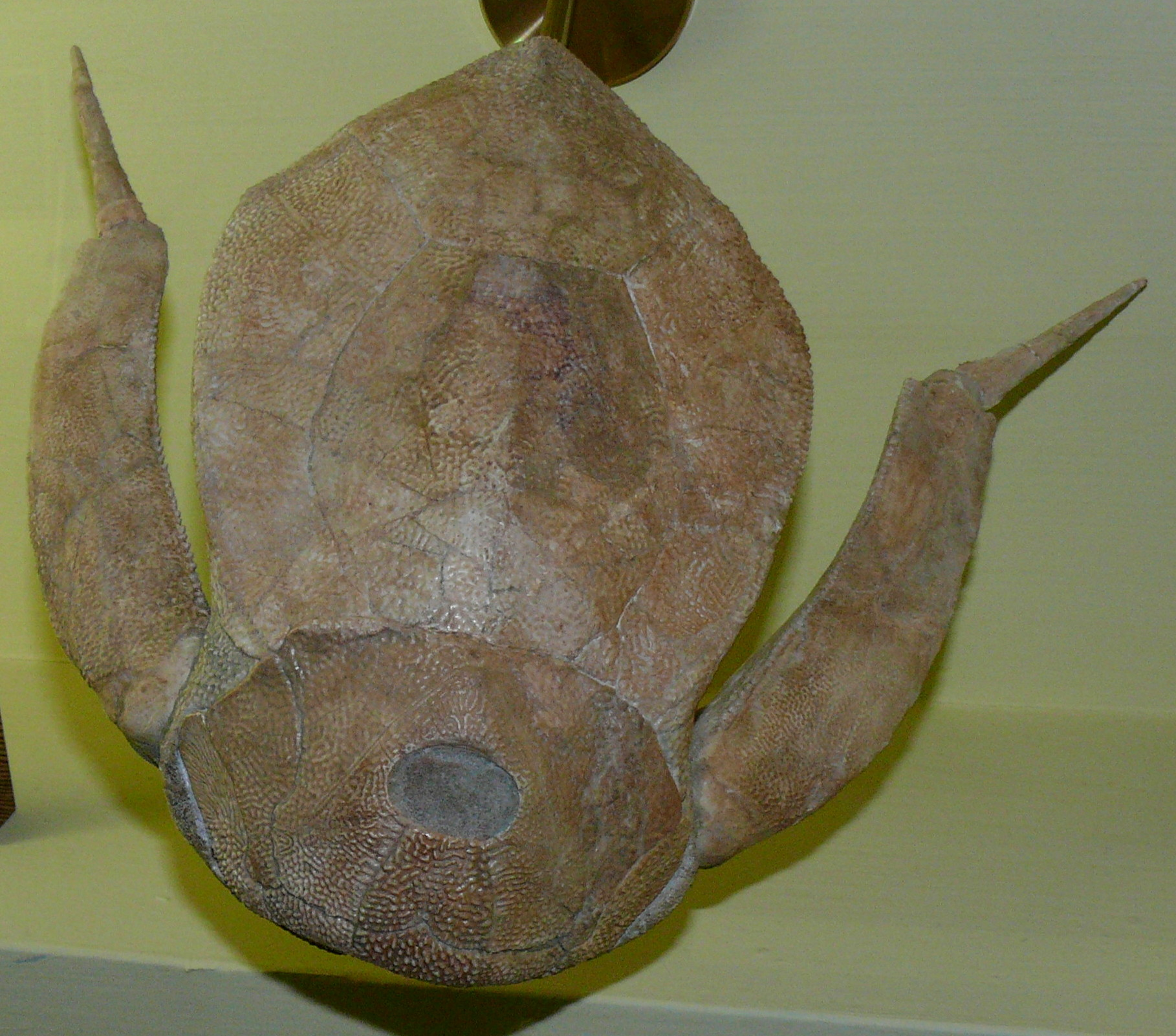

Scientific classification
- Kingdom: Animalia
- Phylum: Chordata
- Class: †Placodermi
- Order: †Antiarchi
- Suborder: †Bothriolepidoidei
- Family: †Bothriolepididae; Cope, 1886

Genera
- †Bothriolepis; †Briagalepis; †Grossilepis; †Monarolepis; †Vietnamaspis; †Wufengshania

= Bothriolepididae =

Bothriolepididae Temporal range: Emsian to Famennian 407.6–358.9 Ma

Extinct family of fishes

Bothriolepididae is a family of antiarch placoderms, known from the Emsian, to Famennian.

== Taxonomy ==
The cladogram is from "Bothriolepid antiarchs (Vertebrata, Placodermi) from the Devonian of the north-western part of the East European Platform".

- Bothriolepidoidei
  - - Microbrachius
    - Wudinolepis
  - - - Dianolepis
      - Jiangxilepis
      - Kirgisolepis
      - Tenizolepis
    - - Monarolepis
      - - Bothriolepis
        - Grossilepis
        - Vietnamaspis
