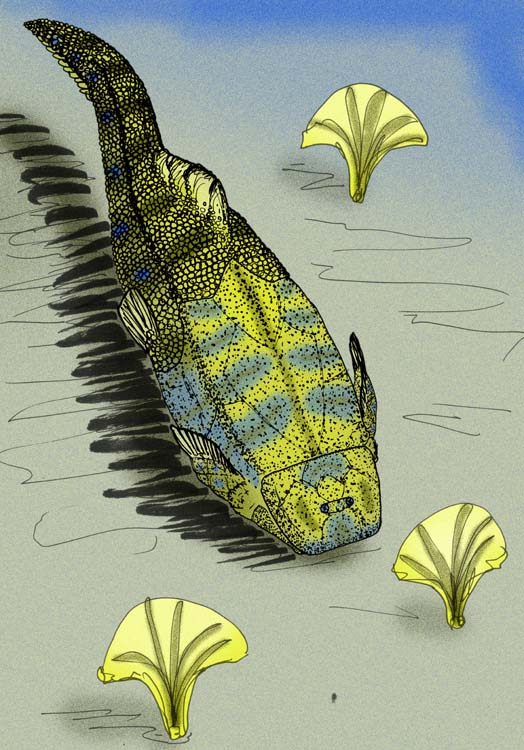
- Shimenolepis granifera

Scientific classification
- Kingdom: Animalia
- Phylum: Chordata
- Class: Placodermi
- Order: Yunnanolepiformes
- Genus: Shimenolepis

Type species
- Shimenolepis granifera Junqing, 1991

= Shimenolepis =

Shimenolepis Temporal range: Ludfordian

Extinct placoderm

Shimenolepis granifera is an extinct yunnanolepid placoderm from the Xiaoxi Formation, Li County, Hunan, China. Its age is discussed, while originally considered as late Llandovery, it is later considered to belong to the Ludlow Epoch instead. It was the first described Silurian placoderm, and was the earliest known placoderm until Xiushanosteus was described, known from distinctively ordered plates.

== Description ==
=== Plates ===
Shimenolepis plates are very similar to the early Devonian yunnanolepid Zhanjilepis, also known from distinctively ornamented plates.
