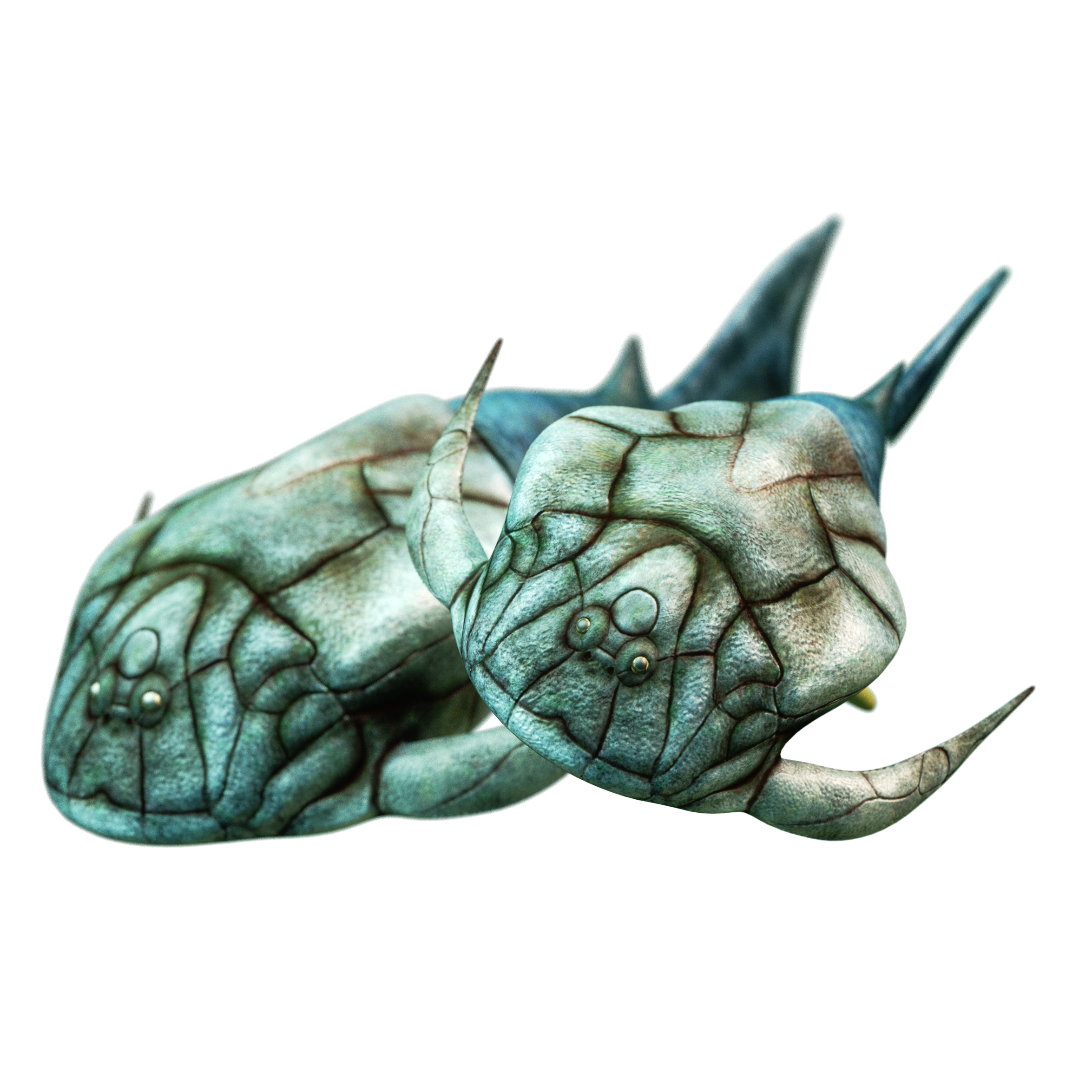

Scientific classification
- Kingdom: Animalia
- Phylum: Chordata
- Class: †Placodermi
- Order: †Antiarchi
- Family: †Microbrachiidae
- Genus: †Microbrachius; Traquair, 1888

Type species
- Microbrachius dicki Traquair, 1888

Species
- M. dicki Traquair, 1888; M. sinensis Pan, 1984; M. chuandongensis Wang & Zhang, 1999; M. kedoae Mark-Kurik et al., 2018

Synonyms
- Microbrachium Woodward, 1891 (Missp.); Microbrachius stegmanni Hoffmann 1911

= Microbrachius =

Microbrachius Temporal range: Emsian to Upper Givetian

Extinct genus of fishes

Microbrachius is an extinct genus of tiny, advanced antiarch placoderms closely related to the bothriolepids. Specimens range in age from the Lower Devonian Late Emsian Stage (393.3 Ma) to the Middle Devonian Upper Givetian Stage (382.7 Ma). They are characterized by having large heads with short thoracic armor of an average length of 2–4 cm. There are patterns of small, but noticeable tubercles on the armor, with the arrangement varying from species to species. Specimens of Microbrachius have been found in Scotland, Belarus, Estonia, and China.

Microbrachius dicki is the earliest placoderm and vertebrate that shows evidence of internal fertilization.

== Anatomy ==
The bony armor of placoderms surrounds the head and trunk of the animal, and is divided into several interlocking plates that fused together. Microbrachids are recognized for their large armor plates around the head and shorter thoracic plates.

== Species ==
=== Microbrachius dicki ===
The type species is from Upper Givetian freshwater strata of Scotland and Estonia, including the John O'Groats sandstone of Caithness, and the Eday beds of the Orkney islands. It is named after its discoverer, Robert Dick. Total armor length is an average of 3 centimeters. It lived about 385 million years ago and is the earliest gnathostome in which internal fertilization has been identified. Newly discovered fossils of M. dicki found in Estonia in 2013 demonstrate clear evidence of unique male and female sexual organs, with males possessing claspers, and females developing fixed plates to lock the claspers in for mating. Separate male and female organs indicate these fish would have been capable of internal fertilization similar to sharks and other cartilaginous fishes, rather than broadcasting gametes externally into the water column like most modern bony fishes. The finding also served to reveal the unusual mating strategy used by this ancient group, which involved a sideways position with their bony arms locked together.

Distinguishing Characteristics:

- Mixilateral plate overlapping the anterior median dorsal plate
- Anterior ventro-lateral plate has a crista postbranchialis undeveloped
- Lateral plates quite broad
- Denticles on the mesial edge of the distal segment of the pectoral appendage are large strongly recurved spines
- Posterior median dorsal plate which is roughly equal to the anterior median dorsal plate
- Well developed lateral corners on the anterior median dorsal plate

=== Microbrachius sinensis ===
This species is from Emsian-aged freshwater strata of the Late Eifelian (387.7 Ma) Qujing Formation in Early Middle Devonian Qujing, China, and predates M. dicki.

Distinguishing Characteristics:

- Poorly developed lateral corners on the anterior median dorsal plate
- Ornamentation on thoracic consists of tubercles fused into distinct lines
- Breadth/Length ratio of 100 of anterior median dorsal plates

=== Microbrachius chuandongensis ===
This species is endemic to the Late Emsian-aged (393.3 Ma) Late Early Devonian Chuandong Formation in Qujing, China. M. chuandongensis was named by Wang in 1999 and is known from several articulated specimens that have poor preservation. This species is currently recognized as the oldest member of the genus.

Distinguishing Characteristics:

- Mixilateral plate overlapping the anterior median dorsal plate
- Anterior median dorsal plate does not have an anterior ventral pit
- Lateral plates quite broad
- Breadth/length ratio of 100 of anterior median dorsal plates
- Posterior median dorsal plate much shorter and smaller than the anterior median dorsal plate
- Ornamentation consists of isolated tubercles in no arrangement

=== Microbrachius kedoae ===
A small species known from a single incomplete specimen from the upper Givetian strata of Belarus . It was discovered in Gavrilchitsy Core 45 (rock core sample) taken by A. Gursenko in 1954 located near village of Gavrilchitsy, Belarus along with unidentifiable osteolepid remains. The specimen was recently described in March 2018 as a new species of Microbrachius closely related to M. dicki. The specimen was from a single siltstone sample located at a depth of 225.25-228.95m. This siltstone correlates to the Moroch Beds of the Polotsk Region Stage. Dating of the Moroch Beds puts M. kedoae in the Late Middle Devonian during the late Givetian stage approximately 385 Ma. M. kedoae is currently recognized as the youngest member of the genus along with M. dicki that occurs in laterally correlative beds.

Distinguishing Characteristics:

- Mixilateral plate is overlapped by the anterior median
- Anterior ventro-lateral plate has a crista postbranchialis developed
- Lateral plates narrow
- Denticles on the mesial edge of the distal segment of the pectoral appendage are fairly blunt
- Anterior median dorsal plate does have an anterior ventral pit
- Ornamentation consists of isolated tubercles in no arrangement
- Well-developed lateral corners on the anterior median dorsal plate

== Sexual dimorphism and mating ==
Claspers (male sex organs) in living vertebrates (sharks, few fish) are used for internal fertilization and penetrative sex. Most modern fish and amphibians fertilize externally by releasing their gametes into the water, where fertilization takes place. M. dicki is the earliest placoderm and vertebrate that shows evidence of internal fertilization. This has been observed in several new specimens that clearly display sexual dimorphism between males and females in the species. These specimens have been found to either have bone claspers for the males or plates for the females, at the end of their armor plates. Reinterpretation of several more derived placoderms have shown similar structures to the condition in M. dicki.

=== Male claspers anatomy ===
The clasper of M. dicki is a deeply grooved dermal bone that curves laterally at almost a 90 degree angle to the side of the animal. The clasper extends in length laterally from the mid line past the width of the trunk shield. These claspers are fused with the posterior ventrolateral plate and to each other. This would suggest that these claspers were incapable of moving. Additionally' there is a groove located on the ventral surface of the clasper. Current hypotheses suggested that the groove was used for sperm delivery either in the form of a transport channel for the sperm or was used for an encased structure that carried the sperm canal. The male clasper having a width wider than the trunk shield would allow males and females to enter coatis from the side as apposed from other angles.

Other placoderms such as ptyctodontid placoderms have similarly shaped claspers. For example, the clasper of Austroptyctodus gardineri is a dermal bone that curves laterally to the side of the animal and resembles a hook.

=== Female genital plate anatomy ===
Female specimens of M. dicki show paired blade-like structures in the same region of the animal that the claspers are in the males. These blades are ornamented with curving ridges and marginal tubercles on their dorsal (internal) surfaces facing the cloacal chamber and are fused to each other and posterior ventral lateral plate as well. The plates are flat and taper to the lateral ends of the transverse ventral ridge inside the lateral lamina of the posterior ventrolateral plate. These blade like structures have been interpreted as female genital plates. These genital plates suggest that they were used as a grip surface for the male clasper to attach to during copulation.

Other placoderms such as the antiarch Pterichthyodes milleri, have identical ornamentation on the dorsal surfaces of the genital plate. Additional, the antiarch Bothriolepis sp. display semicircular plates located in the same anatomical area suggesting that these specimens are females and structures used for mating.

=== Differences from other groups ===
Microbrachichiidae is identified as earliest branching placoderm lineage with claspers. Other placoderm groups such as ptyctodonts and arthrodires display evidence of similar innovations. The clasper structure in Microbrachius is clearly different from the pelvic girdle and pelvic fin. In other more derived antiarchs such as asteolepidoids and bothriolepioids, there is a complete lack of pelvic girdle and fins. In ptyctodont and arthrodire placoderms, the clasper is immediately posterior to the pelvic fin. Arthrodire claspers do not articulate directly with the pelvic girdle or fin. In ptyctodonts, the endoskeleton of the clasper was unossified (unknown affinity to other structures) but away from pelvis.

Placoderms differ from chondrichtyans by having their claspers independent from the pelvis and pelvic fin.

=== Mating behavior ===
One such specimen shows two individuals preserved next to each other in what has been inferred to be side by side mating. As the male and female engaged in coitis, the animals have interlocked claspers to genital plate in a side by side position. Additionally the specimens show the use of interlocked pectoral appendages, possibly to additional help copulation.

=== Implications ===
New specimens of M. dicki have started the conversation of which is the primitive state for reproduction in vertebrates, internal or external fertilization? The traditional model is that external fertilization is the primitive state with internal fertilization evolving at different times in different clades. The discovery of mating specimens M. dicki gives the oldest proof of internal fertilization in jawed vertebrates. This lends credence to the possibility that internal fertilization evolved first and that actinopterygian fish and most lissamphibians (living amphibians) modified or lost these claspers and plates into forms for external fertilization.
