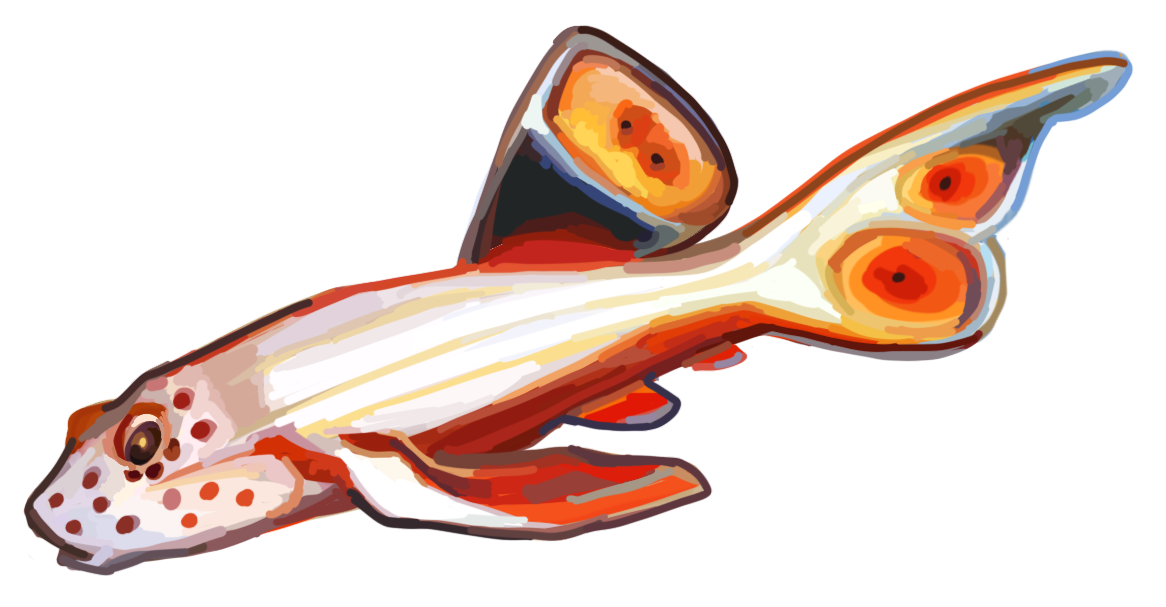
- Artist's reconstruction of W. magniforaminus

Scientific classification
- Domain: Eukaryota
- Kingdom: Animalia
- Phylum: Chordata
- Class: †Placodermi
- Order: †Antiarchi
- Family: †Bothriolepididae
- Genus: †Wufengshania; Pan et al., 2018

Species
- W. magniforaminis Pan et al., 2018

= Wufengshania =

Wufengshania Temporal range: Emsian

Extinct genus of fishes

Wufengshania is an extinct genus of bothriolepidid placoderm from the Emsian epoch of China. The type species, Wufengshania magniforaminis was named by Zhaohui Pan et al., 2018.

== Taxonomy ==
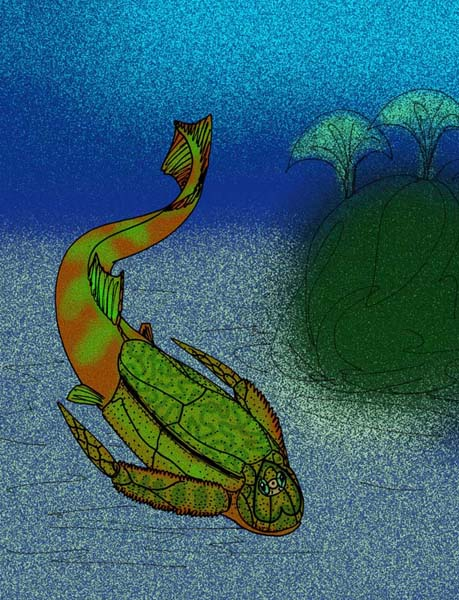
Vietnamaspis trii, a species belongs to the sister group of Wufengshania.

=== Species ===
A single species of Wufengshania magniforaminis has been described so far. W. magniforaminus fossil remains are found in Emsian Late Devonian strata of China.

Along with Bothriolepis, this genus belongs to bothriolepididae, and considered as the sister group of Vietnamaspis.

== See also ==
- List of placoderms
