= Robert Dick (geologist) =

Scottish geologist and botanist

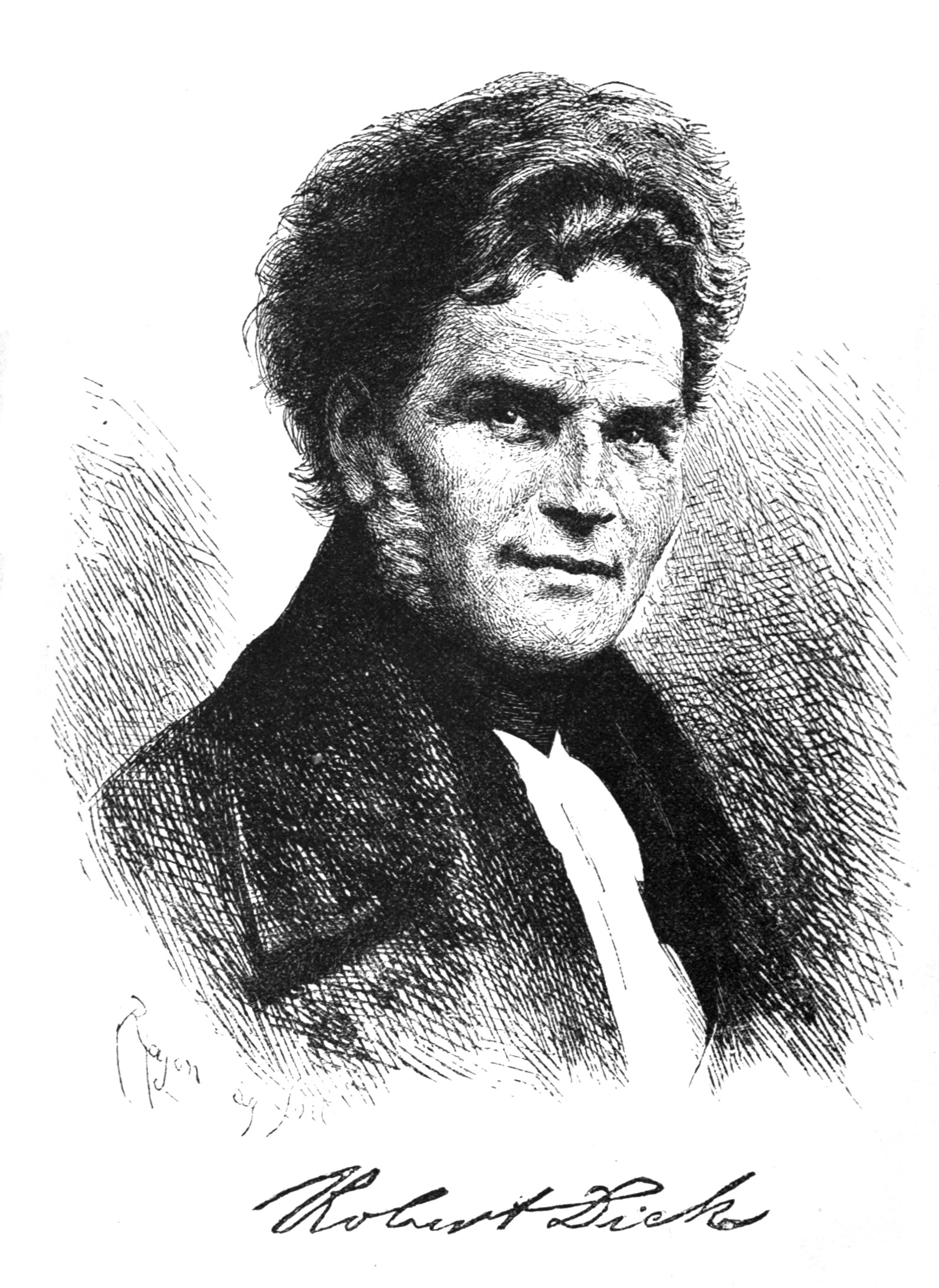

Robert Dick (January 1811 – 24 December 1866), was a Scottish geologist and botanist.

== Life ==
He was born at Tullibody, in Clackmannanshire. His father was an officer of excise in nearby Alloa.

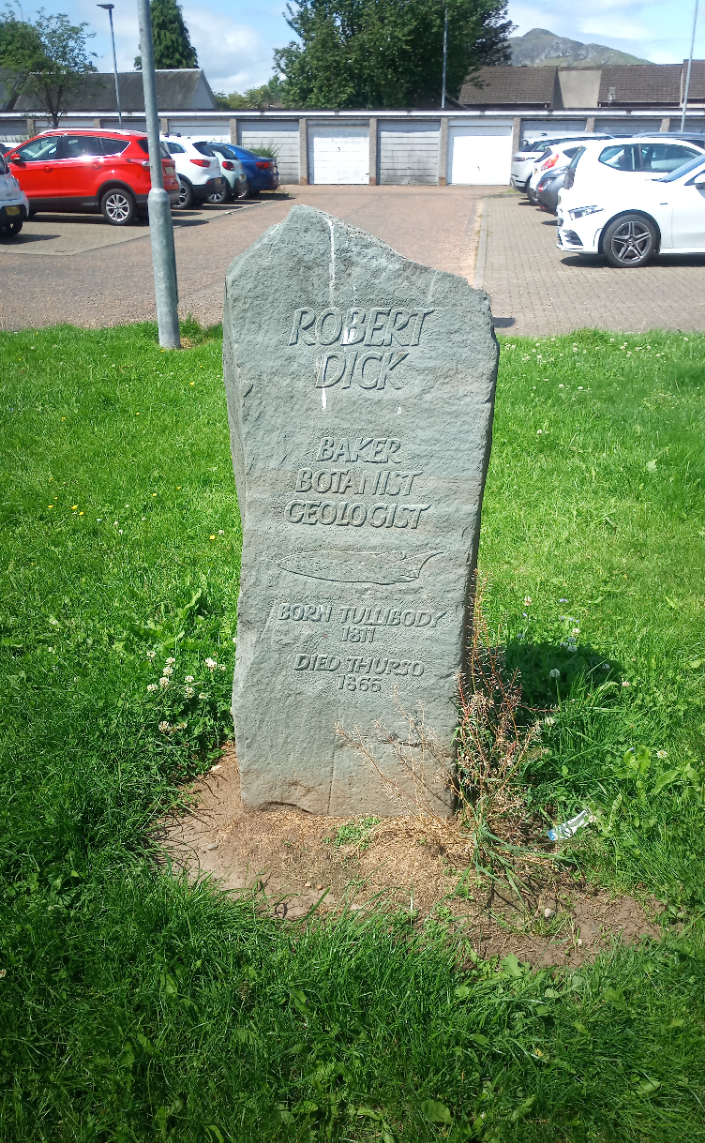
Memorial placed at Dick's birthplace in Tullibody in 2013

At the age of thirteen, after receiving a good elementary education at the parish school, Dick was apprenticed to a baker, and served for three years. In these early days he became interested in wildflowers—he made a collection of plants and gradually acquired some knowledge of their names from an old encyclopedia.

When his time was up he left Tullibody and gained employment as a journeyman baker at Leith, Glasgow and Greenock. Meanwhile, his father, who in 1826 had been removed to Thurso, as supervisor of excise, advised his son to set up a baker's shop in that town. Dick went there in 1830, started a business as a baker, and worked laboriously until his death.

Throughout this period he zealously devoted himself to studying and collecting the plants, mollusca and insects of a wide area of Caithness. Soon after he settled in Thurso his attention was directed to the rocks and fossils. In 1835 he first found remains of fossil fishes; but it was not until some years later that his interests became greatly stirred.

Then he obtained a copy of Hugh Miller's Old Red Sandstone (published in 1841), and he began systematically collecting with hammer and chisel the fossils from the Caithness flags. In 1845 he found remains of Holoptychius and forwarded specimens to Miller, and he continued to send the best of his fossil fish to that geologist, and to other geologists after the death of Miller. In this way he largely contributed to the progress of geological knowledge, although he himself published nothing and was never averse from publicity.

His herbarium, which consisted of about 200 folios of mosses, ferns and flowering plants "almost unique in its completeness," is now stored, with many of his fossils, in the museum at Thurso. Dick had a hard struggle for existence, especially through competition during his late years, when he was reduced almost to beggary: but of this few, if any, of his friends were aware until it was too late. A monument erected in the new cemetery at Thurso testifies to the respect which his life-work created, when the merits of this enthusiastic naturalist came to be appreciated.

One of his discoveries, the 385 million-year-old placoderm Microbrachius dicki was confirmed as the earliest known example of copulation between two sexes.
