= Microbrachiidae =

Microbrachiidae Temporal range: Emsian to Upper Givetian

Scientific classification
- Kingdom: Animalia
- Phylum: Chordata
- Class: †Placodermi
- Order: †Antiarchi
- Suborder: †Bothriolepidoidei
- Family: †Microbrachiidae

Type species
- Microbrachius dicki Traquair, 1888

Genera
- Microbrachius Traquair, 1888; Wudinolepis Chang, 1965; Hohsienolepis Pan, 1978

Extinct family of fishes

Microbrachiidae is an extinct family of tiny, advanced antiarch placoderms closely related to the bothriolepidids.

Although most species are known from Late Emsian-aged strata of Early Devonian China, the type and youngest species, Microbrachius dicki, is known from upper Givetian freshwater strata of Scotland and Estonia.

When Microbrachius was regarded as an Antiarch incertae sedis, the other genera were thought to be very small bothriolepids.

== Genera ==
=== Hohsienolepis ===
Fossils of this genus are found in the Xindu Formation portion of the Late Emsian-aged Chuandong Assembly, in Pingle, Guangxi Province, China. Compared to other microbrachiid genera, Hohsienolepis has a comparatively small head, and an elongated thorax. The armor plates are covered in rows of small tubercles, in a pattern similar to that of M. sinensis.

=== Microbrachium ===
A genus of very small antiarchs, originally described from M. dicki, of Upper Givetian strata of Scotland and Estonia, including the John O'Groats sandstone of Caithness, and the Eday beds of the Orkney Islands. The various species have proportionally big heads and short thoracic armors. The armor plates are decorated in small tubercles. During the 1980s, two more species were described from slightly older strata in China.

=== Wudinolepis ===
As the generic name suggests, Wudinolepis is found in Wuding, Yunnan, China in a Late Emsian-aged stratum called the Jiucheng Formation. It is even smaller than Microbrachius, with the length of its (thoracic) shield around 2 centimeters. Wudinolepis was once placed in its own family, "Wudinolepidae", though Denison (1978) placed it within Bothriolepidae, saying that nothing in the original description excluded it from the latter family. Later, when Microbrachiidae was erected, Wudinolepis was placed within it.
