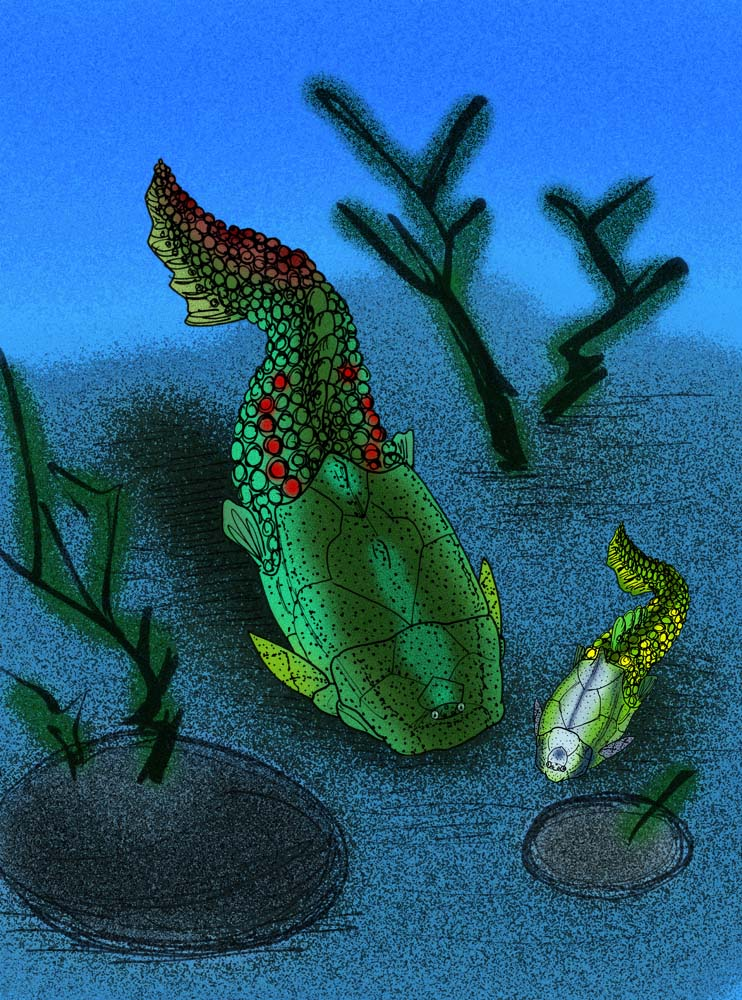
- Yunnanolepis chii and Mizia parvus

Scientific classification
- Kingdom: Animalia
- Phylum: Chordata
- Class: †Placodermi
- Order: †Antiarchi
- Family: †Yunnanolepididae

Type species
- Yunnanolepis chii Liu, 1963

Genera
- Mizia Thanh & Janvier 1994; Parayunnanolepis Tong-Dzuy & Janvier 1990; Phymolepis Zhang Guorui 1978; Vukhuclepis Janvier, Thanh, Phuong & Truong 1997; Yunnanolepis Liu, 1963

Synonyms
- Yunnanolepidae

= Yunnanolepididae =

Yunnanolepididae Temporal range: Early to Middle Devonian

Extinct family of fishes

Yunnanolepididae is an extinct family of primitive Antiarch placoderms characterized by having short, broad skull roofs, and by having a feature on the visceral side of the posterior medial dorsal plate, the crista transversalis interna posterior, which is diagnostic of antiarchs, turning forward, and lying in front of the posterior ventral process and pit (with this position being diagnostic of yunnanolepids in particular).

At least three genera, Yunnanolepis, Phymolepis, and Vukhuclepis are confirmed to have a unique organ called the "Chang's Apparatus," named in honor of Professor Meemann Chang, which is an internal cavity with an external opening within the suture of the anterior dorsal lateral plate and the anterior ventral lateral plate. The other genera in Yunnanolepidae that are not confirmed to have the Chang's Apparatus are included in the family because of anatomical similarities to Yunnanolepis.

The fossils of the various genera are found in Early to Middle Devonian strata in Southern China and Middle Devonian strata in Vietnam.
