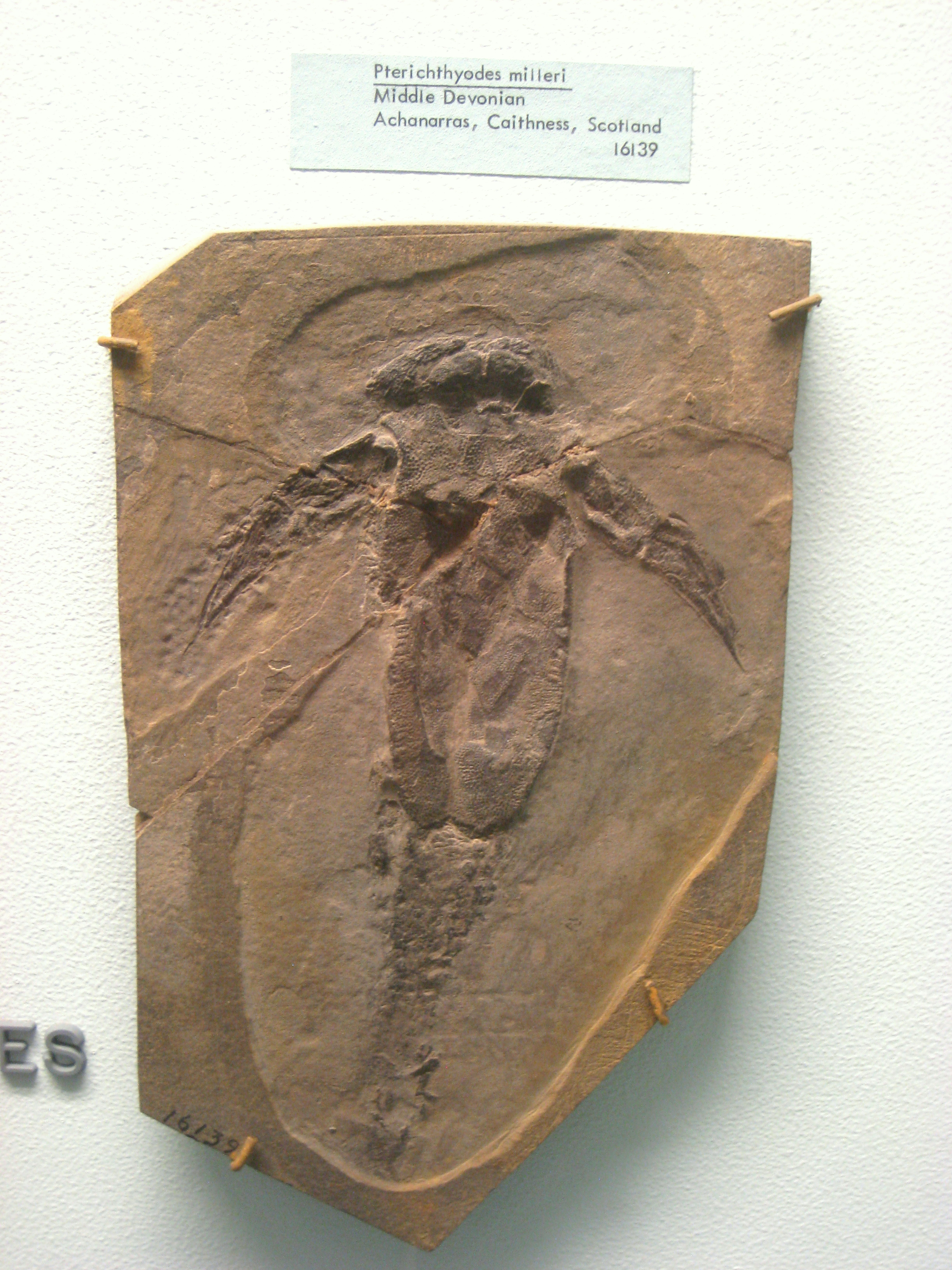
- Pterichthyodes milleri fossil on display at the University of Michigan Exhibit Museum of Natural History

Scientific classification
- Kingdom: Animalia
- Phylum: Chordata
- Class: †Placodermi
- Order: †Antiarchi
- Family: †Pterichthyodidae; Stensiö, 1948
- Genus: †Pterichthyodes; Bleeker, 1859

Type species
- †Pterichthyodes milleri
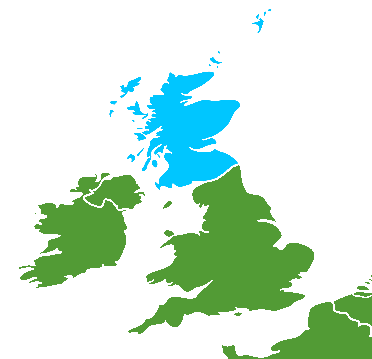
- Areas where Pterichthyodes has been found

Synonyms
- †Pterichthys

= Pterichthyodes =

Pterichthyodes Temporal range: Middle Devonian

Extinct genus of fishes

Pterichthyodes is a genus of antiarch placoderm fishes from the Devonian period. Its fossils have been discovered in Scotland. They were one of the first species recognized for what they were, as their fossils are common in the Old Red Sandstone formation studied by geologists in the early 19th century. Due to their extreme divergence from modern-day fish, they were a puzzle unsolved until Charles Darwin brought forward his theories on evolution.

== Description ==
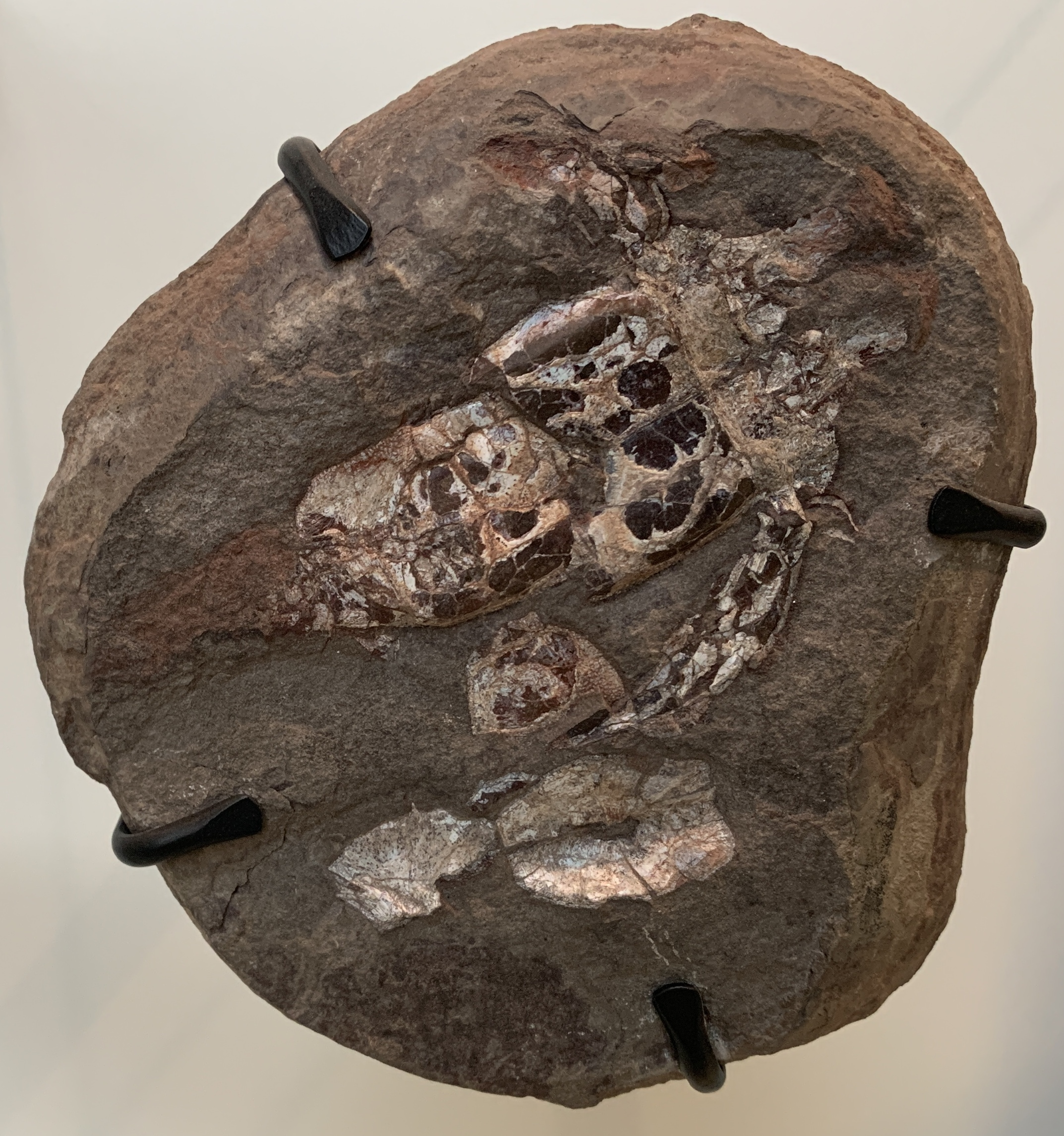
From Lethen, Nairnshire, Scotland.

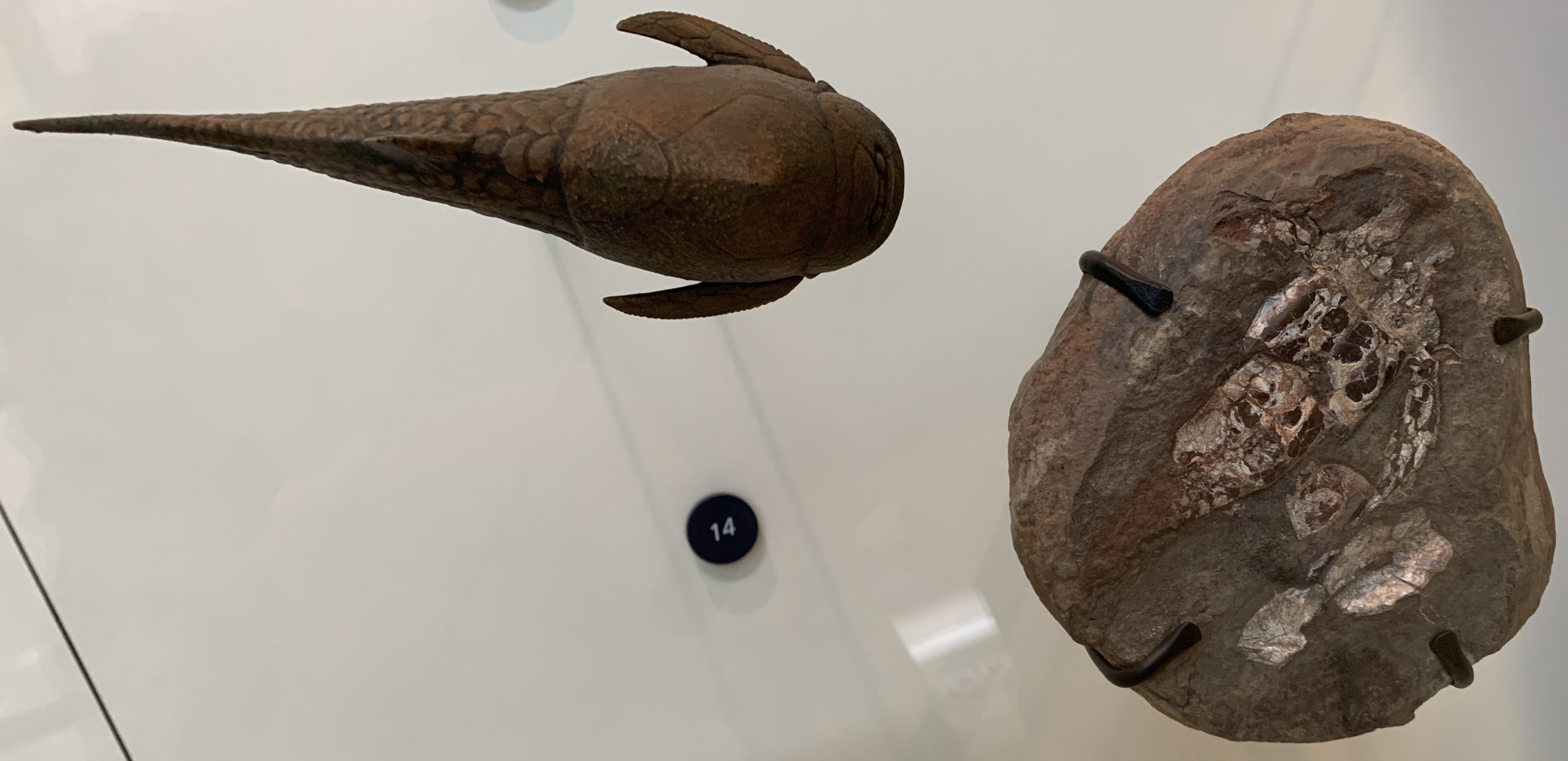
Next to a 1953 plaster model.

As with all other antiarchs, Pterichthyodes had heavily armored heads and forebodies, while their scaly tails were unarmored. Specimen length ranges from 8 inches (20 cm) to 12 inches (30 cm). As placoderms, they were members of the earliest known vertebrates to possess jaws, though they had grinding plates rather than teeth. The generic name of Pterichthyodes refers directly to their odd wing-like appendages ("pterichthys" being a compound crassis word from Ancient Greek for "wing-fish"), which correspond to and were derived from the pectoral fins seen in modern fish and other non-antiarch placoderms. Fossils of Pterichtyodes showing eyes positioned on the direct of the head and a "ventrally flattened trunk shield" suggest that it was a "bottom dweller", living at the bottom of lakes, where it might have crawled using its pectoral appendages. It has also been theorized that Pterichthyodes and other antiarchs used these appendages to bury itself.

Pterichthyodes would have fed by browsing shallower areas of the lake bed for decaying detritus.

Artistic Reconstructions

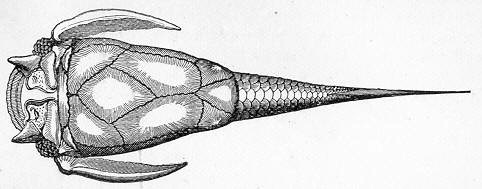
1876

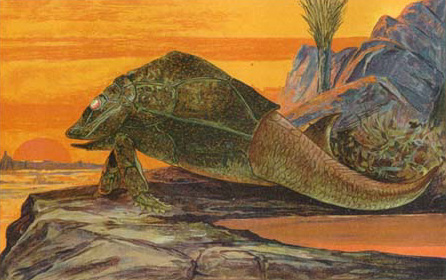
1902, with an outdated terrestrial depiction.

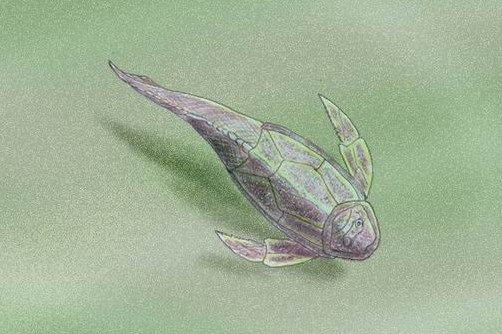
2009
