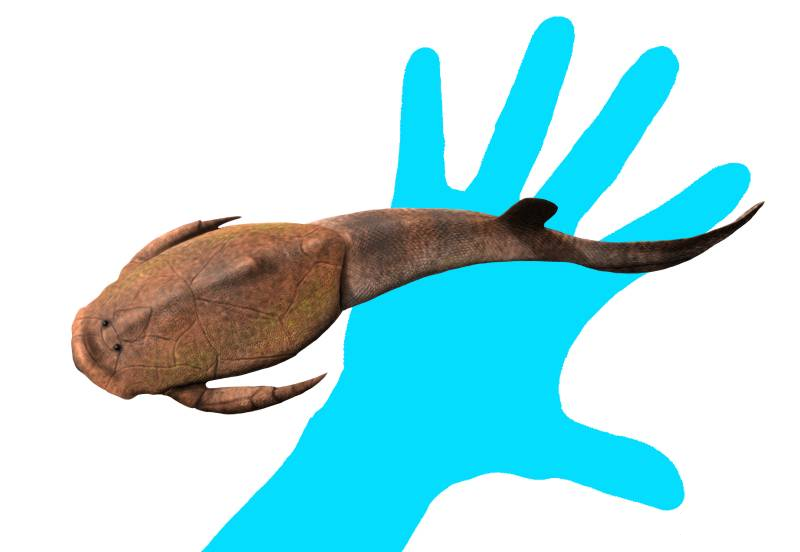
- CGI reconstruction of Y. chii

Scientific classification
- Kingdom: Animalia
- Phylum: Chordata
- Class: †Placodermi
- Order: †Antiarchi
- Family: †Yunnanolepididae
- Genus: †Yunnanolepis; Liu, 1963

Type species
- Yunnanolepis chii Liu, 1963

Species
- Y. bacboensis Tong-Dzuy & Janvier 1990; Y. chii Liu, 1963; Y. deprati Tong-Dzuy & Janvier 1990; Y. meemannae Thanh & Janvier 1994; Y. porifera Zhu 1996; Y. spinulosa Janvier & Phuong 1999

= Yunnanolepis =

Yunnanolepis Temporal range: Early-Middle Devonian ~416–412.3 Ma

Extinct genus of fishes

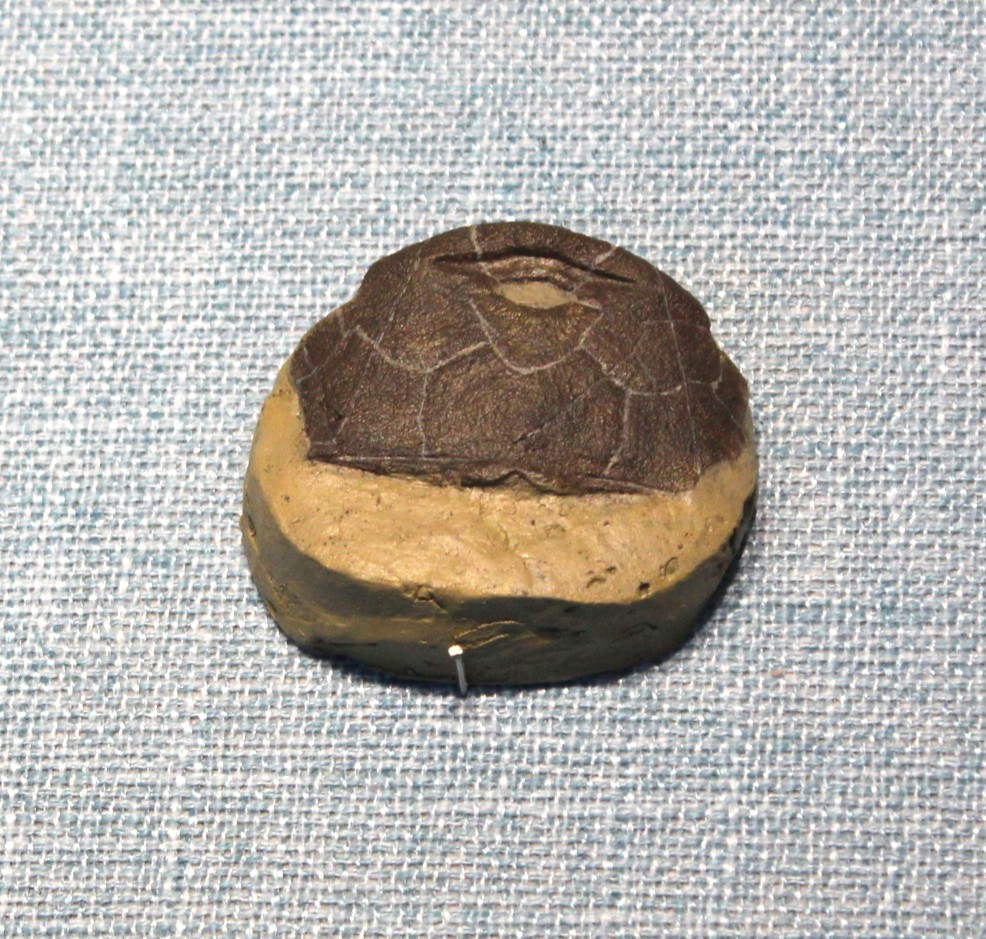
Y. chii specimen, Baoding Natural History Museum

Yunnanolepis is an extinct genus of primitive antiarch placoderm. The fossils of the various species are found in Early to Middle Devonian strata in Southern China (Xishancun, Lianhuashan and Xitun Formations).
