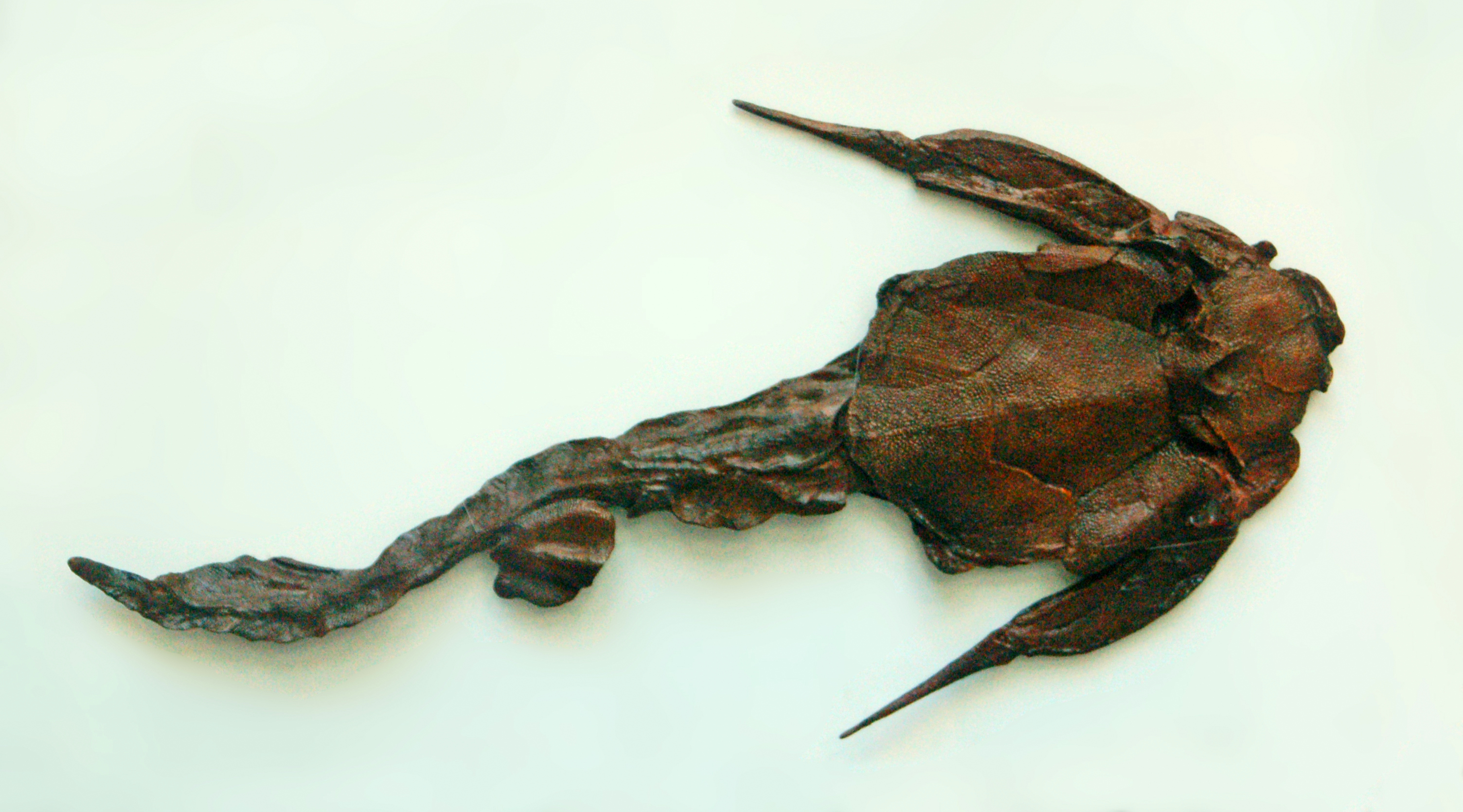
- Bothriolepis canadensis

Scientific classification
- Kingdom: Animalia
- Phylum: Chordata
- Class: †Placodermi
- Order: †Antiarchi; Cope, 1885

= Antiarchi =

Antiarchi Temporal range: Ludfordian- Famennian 425.6–358.9 Ma

Extinct order of fishes

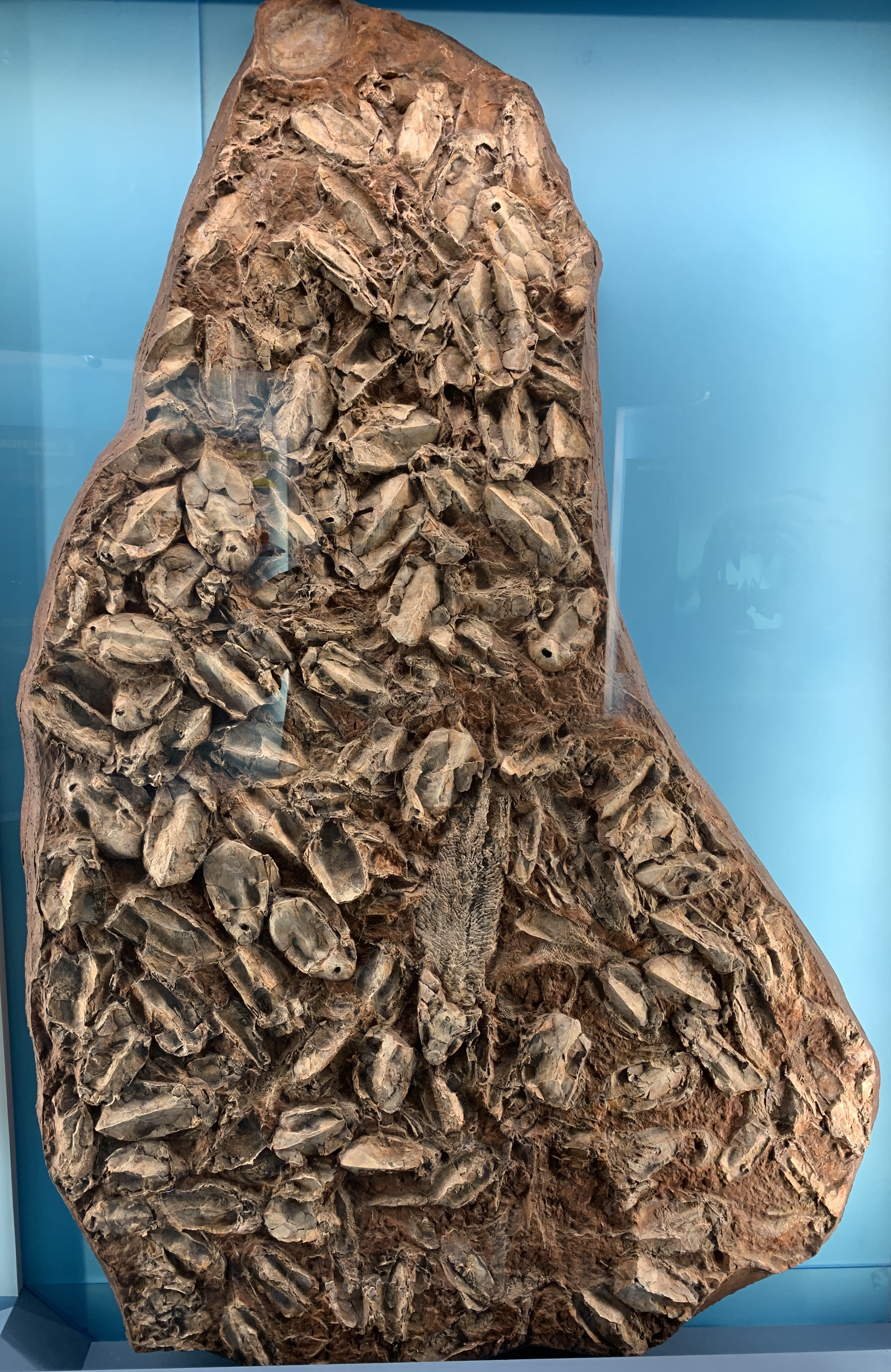
Fossil fish slab, cast. Late Devonian, Mandagery Sandstone, Canowindra, New South Wales (Australia). Preserves 114 fish individuals, which died when their freshwater pond dried up. Most of the individuals in the slab are the antiarch placoderms Remigolepis walkeri and Bothriolepis yeungae. One sarcopterygian individual is present, Canowindra grossi, the largest fish in the slab. Two small and inconspicuous juvenile Groenlandaspis are also preserved.

Antiarchi ("opposite anus") is an order of heavily armored placoderms. The antiarchs form the second-most successful group of placoderms after the arthrodires in terms of numbers of species and range of environments. The order's name was coined by Edward Drinker Cope, who, when examining some fossils that he thought were armored tunicates related to Chelyosoma, mistakenly thought that the orbital fenestra (i.e., the hole in the headshield for the eyes, nose and pineal foramen) was the opening for the mouth, or oral siphon, and that the opening for the anal siphon was on the other side of the body, as opposed to having both oral and anal siphons together at one end.

The front portions of their bodies were heavily armored, to the point of literally resembling a box with eyes, with the sometimes scaled, sometimes naked rear portions often becoming sinuous, particularly with later forms. The pair of pectoral fins were modified into a pair of caliper-like, or arthropod-like limbs. In primitive forms, such as Yunnanolepis, the limbs were thick and short, while in advanced forms, such as Bothriolepis, the limbs were long and had elbow-like joints. The function of the limbs are still not perfectly understood, but, most hypothesize that they helped their owners pull themselves across the substrate, as well as allow their owners to bury themselves into the substrate.

Antiarchi, along with Brindabellaspis, form some of the most basal clades of the Placodermi, or Gnathostomata. They are more related to other placoderms and the more derived jawed fish than the Cephalaspidomorphi.

== Phylogeny ==
Below is a cladogram from Jia et al. (2010):

- Antiarchi
  - Parayunnanolepis
  - - Dayaoshania
    - Grenfellaspis
  - Euantiarcha
    - Bothriolepidoidei
      - Luquanolepis
      - - Nawagiaspis
        - - Jiangxilepididae
            - Jiangxilepis
            - Ningxialepis
          - - Dianolepis
            - - Bothriolepididae
                - - Bothriolepis
                  - Grossilepis
                - - Monarolepis
                  - Briagalepis
              - Microbrachiidae
                - Wudinolepis
                - - Hohsienolepis
                  - Microbrachius
    - Asterolepidoidei
      - Byssacanthus
      - - - Hunanolepis
          - - - Kirgisolepis
              - Pterichthyodes
            - - Gerdalepis
              - Sherbonaspis
        - - Stegolepis
          - - Asterolepis
            - - Remigolepis
              - Pambulaspis

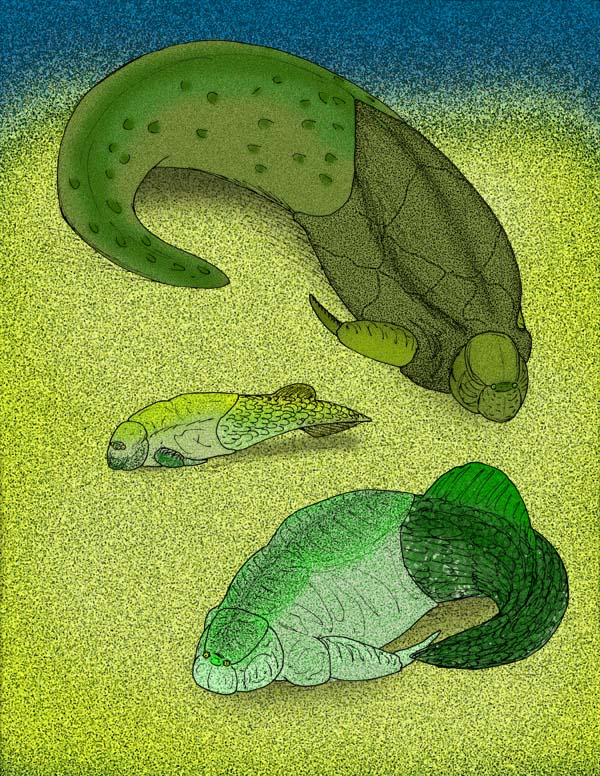
Chuchinolepis, Vanchienolepis and Yunnanolepis
