= List of the Paleozoic life of Illinois =

This list of the Paleozoic life of Illinois contains the various prehistoric life-forms whose fossilized remains have been reported from within the US state of Illinois and are between 538.8 and 252.17 million years of age.

== A ==
- †Acantherpestes
  - †Acantherpestes inequalis – type locality for species
  - †Acantherpestes major – type locality for species
- †Acanthoparypha
  - †Acanthoparypha subcircularis
- †Acanthopecten
  - †Acanthopecten carboniferus
- †Acanthotriletes
  - †Acanthotriletes aculeolatus
  - †Acanthotriletes dimorphus
- †Achatella
  - †Achatella katharina
- †Acrocrinus
  - †Acrocrinus constrictus
- †Actinoceras
- †Actinopteria
  - †Actinopteria boydi
- †Adeloblatta
  - †Adeloblatta columbiana – type locality for species
  - †Adeloblatta sellardsi
- †Adeloneura – type locality for genus
  - †Adeloneura thompsoni – type locality for species
- †Adiaphtharsia – type locality for genus
  - †Adiaphtharsia ferrea – type locality for species
- †Adiphlebia – type locality for genus
  - †Adiphlebia lacoana – type locality for species
- †Adolarryia – type locality for genus
  - †Adolarryia bairdi – type locality for species
- †Aenigmatodes – type locality for genus
  - †Aenigmatodes danielsi – type locality for species
- †Aetophlebia – type locality for genus
  - †Aetophlebia singularis – type locality for species
- †Agogoblattina
  - †Agogoblattina occidua – type locality for species
- †Ahrenisporites
  - †Ahrenisporites guerickei
- †Ahrensisporites
  - †Ahrensisporites guerickei
- †Alanympha – type locality for genus
  - †Alanympha richardsoni – type locality for species
- †Alatisporites
  - †Alatisporites hexalatus
  - †Alatisporites punctatus
  - †Alatisporites trialatus
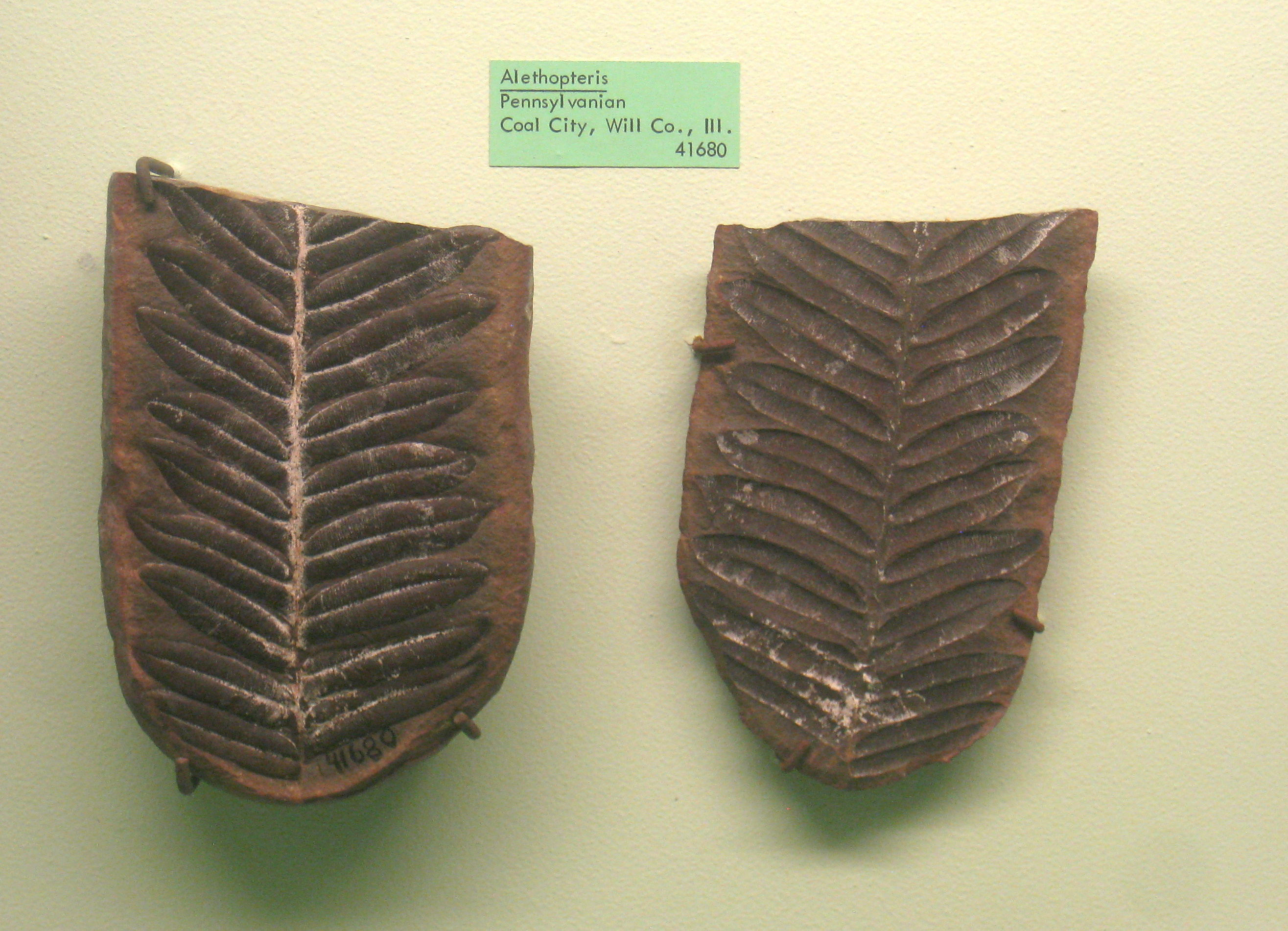
- Fossilized fronds of the Carboniferous-Early Cretaceous seed fern Alethopteris
  †Alethopteris
  - †Alethopteris decurrens
  - †Alethopteris lonchitica
  - †Alethopteris owenii
  - †Alethopteris serlii
- †Allagecrinus
  - †Allagecrinus mccraneyensis – type locality for species
- †Alloiopteris
  - †Alloiopteris gracillima
  - †Alloiopteris quercifolia – or unidentified comparable form
  - †Alloiopteris sternbergi
- †Allosocrinus
  - †Allosocrinus bronaughi
- †Amarixys
  - †Amarixys gracilis – type locality for species
  - †Amarixys stellaris – type locality for species
  - †Amarixys sulcata – type locality for species
- †Amaurotoma
  - †Amaurotoma leavenworthana
- †Ambocoelia
  - †Ambocoelia louisianaensis
  - †Ambocoelia minuta
- †Ambonychia – tentative report
- †Ametretus – type locality for genus
  - †Ametretus laevis – type locality for species
- †Ameura
- †Amousus – type locality for genus
  - †Amousus mazonus – type locality for species
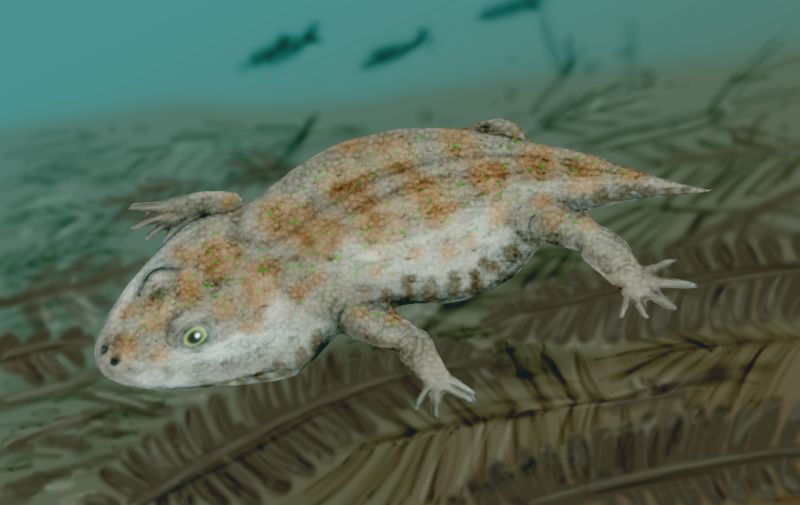
- Life restoration of the Carboniferous amphibian Amphibamus
  †Amphibamus – type locality for genus
  - †Amphibamus grandiceps – type locality for species
- †Amphicoelia
- †Amphilichas
  - †Amphilichas subdisjunctus
- †Amphiscapha
  - †Amphiscapha subrugosa
- †Amplexizaphrentis
  - †Amplexizaphrentis spinulosus
- †Amynilyspes – type locality for genus
  - †Amynilyspes wortheni – type locality for species
- †Anaphragma
  - †Anaphragma mirabile
- †Anapiculatisporites
  - †Anapiculatisporites grundensis
  - †Anapiculatisporites spinosus
- †Anastrophia
- †Anegertus – type locality for genus
  - †Anegertus cubitalis – type locality for species
- †Anematina
  - †Anematina proutana
- †Anepitedius – type locality for genus
  - †Anepitedius giraffa – type locality for species
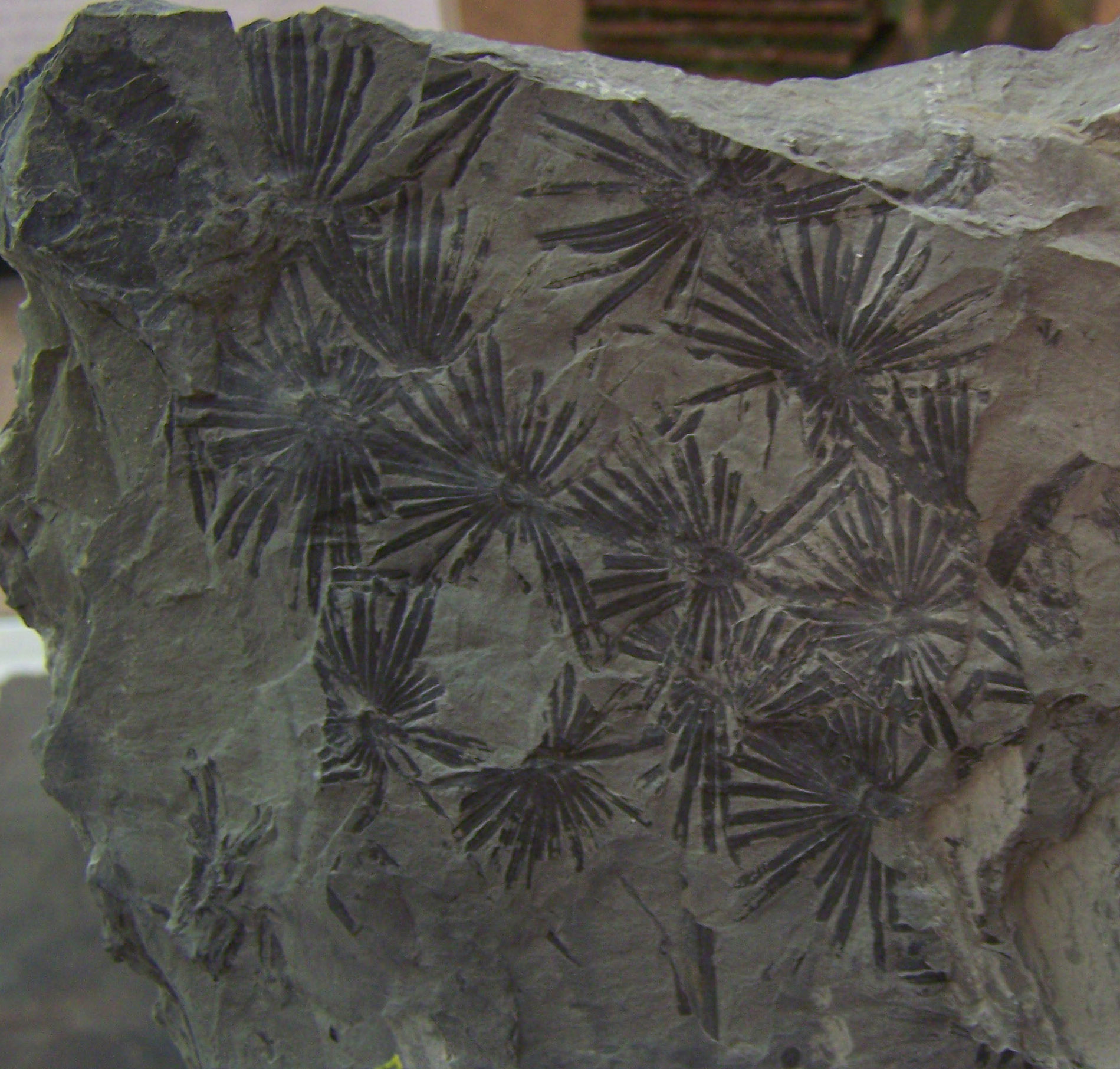
- Fossil of the Carboniferous horsetail relative Annularia
  †Annularia
  - †Annularia asteris – or unidentified comparable form
  - †Annularia cuspidata
  - †Annularia stellata
  - †Annularia vernensis – or unidentified comparable form
- †Anobasicrinus
  - †Anobasicrinus brevis – type locality for species
- †Anomphalus – type locality for genus
  - †Anomphalus rotulus – type locality for species
- †Anthracoceras
  - †Anthracoceras wanlessi – type locality for species
- †Anthracophausia
  - †Anthracophausia ingelsorum
- †Anthracoscorpio – tentative report
- †Anthracospirifer
  - †Anthracospirifer leidyi
- †Anthracothremma – type locality for genus
  - †Anthracothremma robusta – type locality for species
- †Anthrakoris – type locality for genus
  - †Anthrakoris aetherius – type locality for species
- †Antiquatonia
  - †Antiquatonia portlockianus – or unidentified comparable form
- †Antirhynchonella
  - †Antirhynchonella ventricosa – or unidentified comparable form
- †Aphantomartus
  - †Aphantomartus pustulatus – type locality for species
- †Apiculatasporites
  - †Apiculatasporites latigranifer
  - †Apiculatasporites setulosus
  - †Apiculatasporites spinososaetosus
  - †Apiculatasporites variocorneus
  - †Apiculatasporites variusetosus
- †Apiculatisporites
  - †Apiculatisporites abditus
  - †Apiculatisporites frequentisporites
  - †Apiculatisporites lappites
  - †Apiculatisporites setulosus
- †Apithanus – type locality for genus
  - †Apithanus jocularis – type locality for species
- †Apographiocrinus
  - †Apographiocrinus typicalis
- †Archaeocalamites
  - †Archaeocalamites radiatus
- †Archaeocalyptocrinus
  - †Archaeocalyptocrinus obconicus
- †Archaeocidaris – tentative report
- †Archaeologus – type locality for genus
  - †Archaeologus falcatus – type locality for species
- †Archaeopteris
  - †Archaeopteris stricta
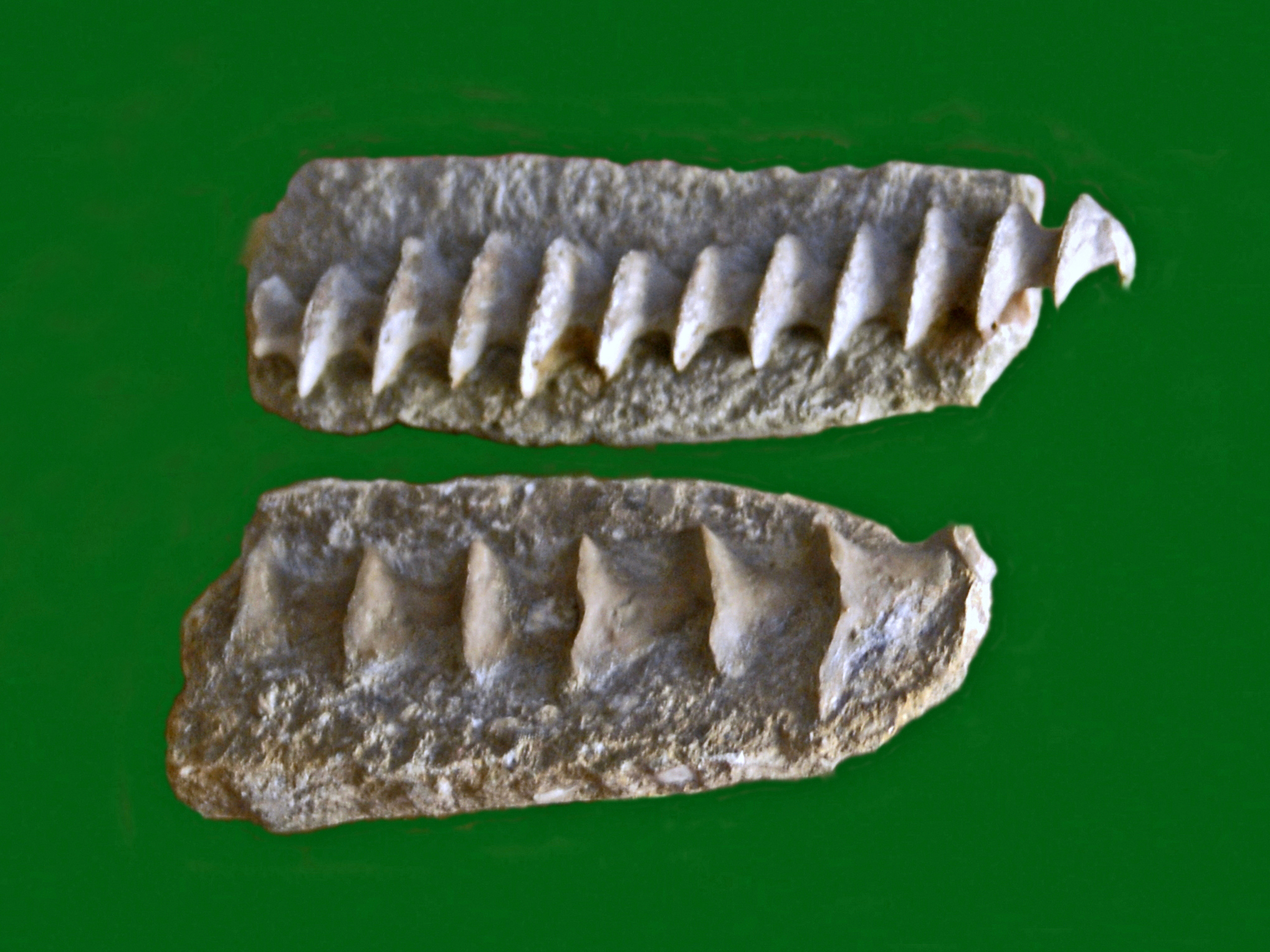
- Fossils of the Carboniferous-Permian bryozoan Archimedes
  †Archimedes
  - †Archimedes communis
  - †Archimedes compactus
  - †Archimedes invaginatus
  - †Archimedes lativolvis
  - †Archimedes macfarlani
  - †Archimedes swallovanus
  - †Archimedes terebriformis
- †Archimylacris
  - †Archimylacris paucinervis – type locality for species
- †Archisymplectes – type locality for genus
  - †Archisymplectes rhothon – type locality for species
- †Architarbus – type locality for genus
  - †Architarbus minor – type locality for species
  - †Architarbus rotundatus – type locality for species
- †Archiulus – tentative report
  - †Archiulus glomeratus – type locality for species
- †Archoblattina – type locality for genus
  - †Archoblattina beecheri – type locality for species
  - †Archoblattina scudderi – type locality for species
- †Arctinurus
  - †Arctinurus boltoni
  - †Arctinurus chicagoensis
- †Argentiproductus
  - †Argentiproductus auriculatus
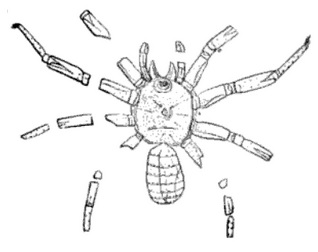
- Illustration of a fossil of the Carboniferous-Permian spider Arthrolycosa. Charles Emerson Beecher (1889).
  †Arthrolycosa – type locality for genus
  - †Arthrolycosa antiqua – type locality for species
  - †Arthrolycosa danielsi – type locality for species
- †Arthropitys
  - †Arthropitys communis
- †Artisia
  - †Artisia transversa
- †Asemoblatta
  - †Asemoblatta danielsi – type locality for species
  - †Asemoblatta mazona – type locality for species
- †Asinomphalus
  - †Asinomphalus antiqua
- †Asolanus
  - †Asolanus camptotaenia
- †Astartella
  - †Astartella compacta
  - †Astartella concentrica
- †Asterophyllites
  - †Asterophyllites equisetiformis – or unidentified comparable form
  - †Asterophyllites longifolius
  - †Asterophyllites multifolia
- †Asterotheca
  - †Asterotheca miltoni – or unidentified comparable form
- †Astraeospongium
- †Asyncritus – type locality for genus
  - †Asyncritus reticulatus – type locality for species
- †Athyris
  - †Athyris vittata
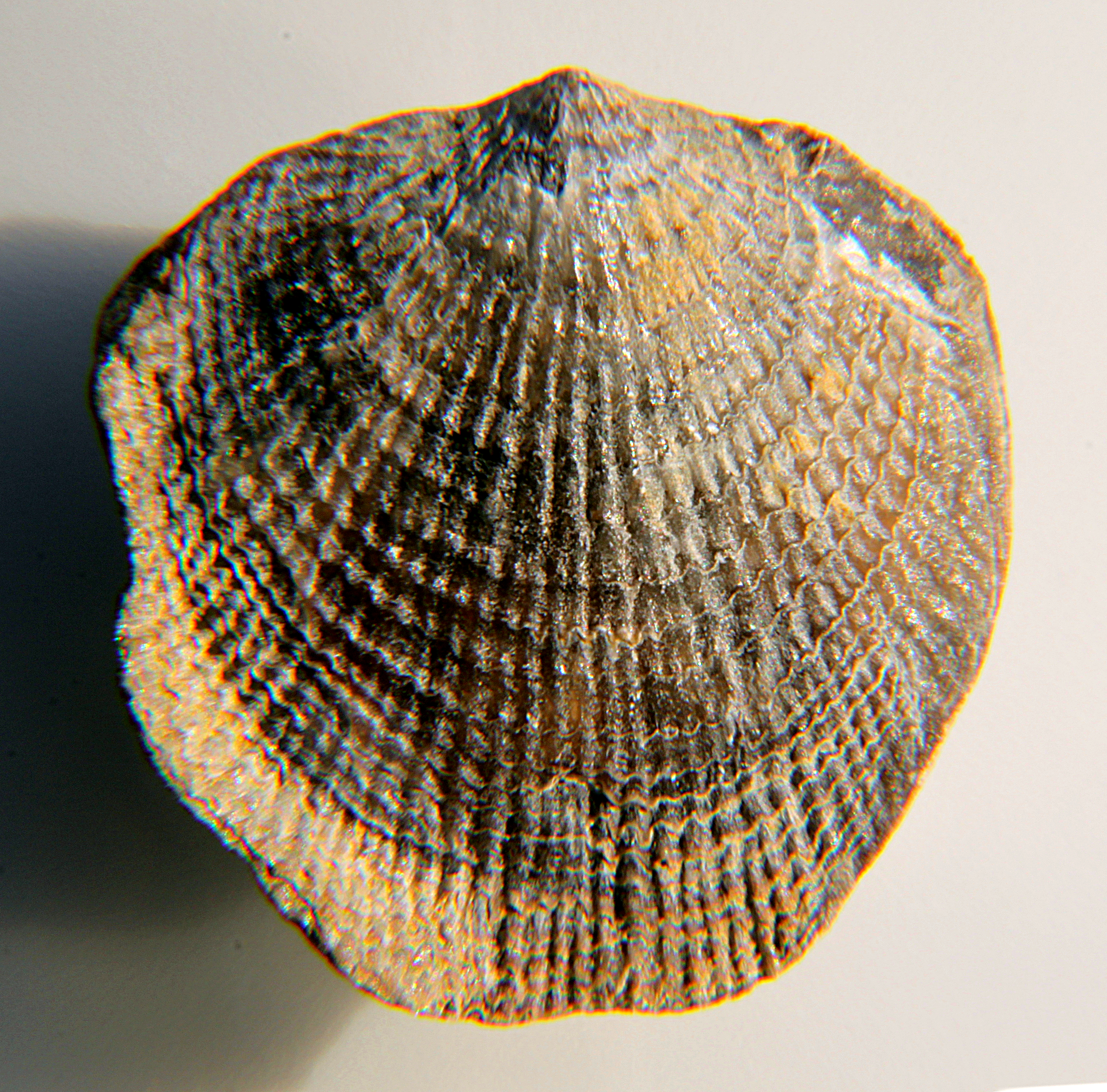
- Fossilized shell of the Late Ordovician-Carboniferous brachiopod Atrypa
  †Atrypa
  - †Atrypa putilla
  - †Atrypa reticularis – report made of unidentified related form or using admittedly obsolete nomenclature
- †Aulacotheca
- †Aulertupus – type locality for genus
  - †Aulertupus tembrocki – type locality for species
- †Aviculopecten
  - †Aviculopecten fasciculatus
- † Avonia
  - †Avonia pyidata
- †Axiodeaneia
  - †Axiodeaneia glenparkensis
- †Axiologus – type locality for genus
  - †Axiologus thoracicus – type locality for species

== B ==
- †Balteosporites
  - †Balteosporites minutus
- †Bandringa – type locality for genus
  - †Bandringa herdinae – type locality for species
  - †Bandringa rayi – type locality for species
- †Bassleroceras
  - †Bassleroceras lasallense
- †Baylea
  - †Baylea minuta – type locality for species
  - †Baylea sinuatus – type locality for species
  - †Baylea subconstricta – type locality for species
- †Beecheria
  - †Beecheria illinoisense
  - †Beecheria paraplicata
- †Belemnospongia
  - †Belemnospongia parmula
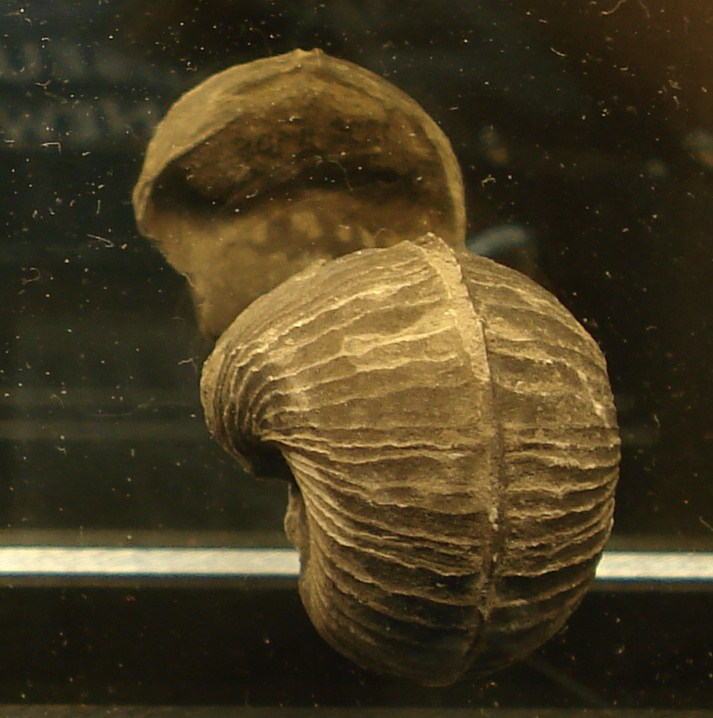
- Fossilized shell of the Silurian-Early Triassic mollusc Bellerophon
  †Bellerophon
  - †Bellerophon chesterensis – type locality for species
  - †Bellerophon incomptus – type locality for species
  - †Bellerophon spergensis
  - †Bellerophon stevensianus
  - †Bellerophon tenuilineata – type locality for species
- †Belinurus
  - †Belinurus lacoei – type locality for species
- †Bembexia
  - †Bembexia gradilispira – type locality for species
- †Beyrichiella
  - †Beyrichiella confluens
- †Bicarina
  - †Bicarina petilitornata
- †Bighornia
  - †Bighornia patella – or unidentified comparable form
- †Bizarrea – type locality for genus
  - †Bizarrea obscura – type locality for species
- †Blattoidea
  - †Blattoidea anceps – type locality for species
  - †Blattoidea carri – type locality for species
  - †Blattoidea melanderi
  - †Blattoidea schuchertiana – type locality for species
  - †Blattoidea sellardsiana – type locality for species
- †Brabeocrinus – type locality for genus
  - †Brabeocrinus christinae – type locality for species
- †Brachycycloceras
  - †Brachycycloceras normale
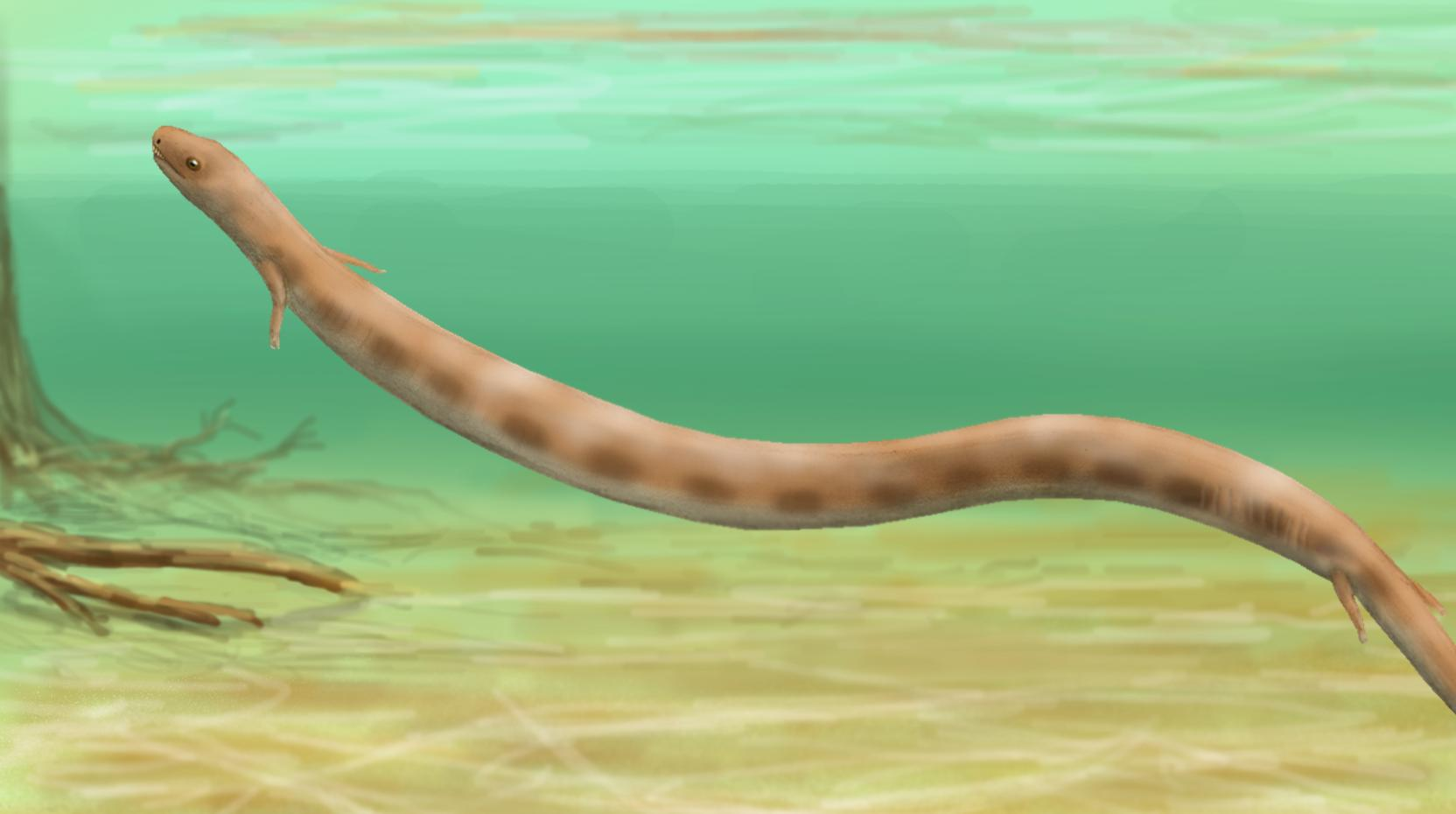
- Life restoration of the Carboniferous amphibian Brachydectes
  †Brachydectes
  - †Brachydectes newberryi
- †Brachythyris
  - †Brachythyris hortonensis
- †Brevilamnulella – tentative report
  - †Brevilamnulella thebesensis
- †Bucania
  - †Bucania batchtownensis – type locality for species
- †Bulimorpha
  - †Bulimorpha minor
  - †Bulimorpha whitfieldi – type locality for species
- †Bumastoides
  - †Bumastoides billingsi
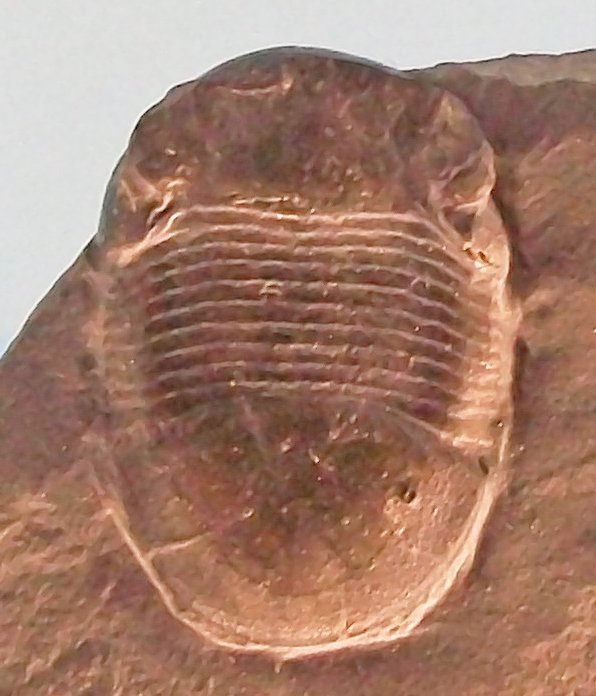
- Fossil of the Early Ordovician-Silurian trilobite Bumastus
  †Bumastus
  - †Bumastus armata
  - †Bumastus armatus – or unidentified comparable form
  - †Bumastus chicagoensis
  - †Bumastus cuniculus – or unidentified comparable form
  - †Bumastus graftonensis
  - †Bumastus insignis
  - †Bumastus springfieldensis
  - †Bumastus transversalis
- †Buthiscorpius
  - †Buthiscorpius lemayi – type locality for species

== C ==
- †Cacurgus – type locality for genus
  - †Cacurgus spilopterus – type locality for species
- †Cadiospora
  - †Cadiospora fithiana
  - †Cadiospora magna
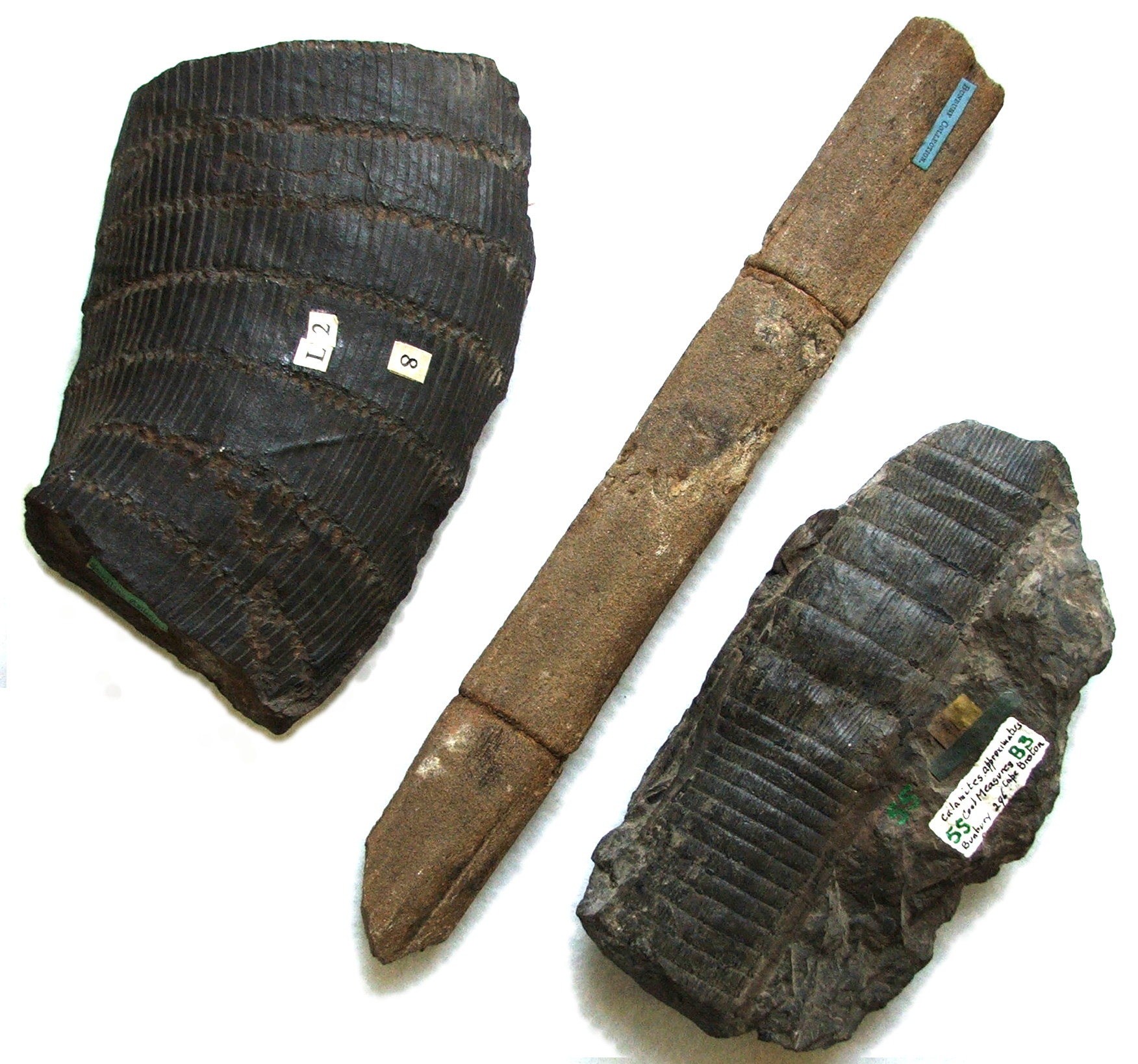
- Fossilized stems from the Carboniferous-Permian horsetail relative Calamites
  †Calamites
  - †Calamites cistiiformis – or unidentified comparable form
  - †Calamites rectangularis
  - †Calamites suckowii
- †Calamocarpon
  - †Calamocarpon insignis
- †Calamodendron
  - †Calamodendron americanum
- †Calamospora
  - †Calamospora breviradiata
  - †Calamospora flava
  - †Calamospora flexilis
  - †Calamospora hartungiana
  - †Calamospora liquida
  - †Calamospora minuta
  - †Calamospora mutabilis
  - †Calamospora pedata
  - †Calamospora straminea
- †Calamostachys
  - †Calamostachys americana
  - †Calamostachys andanensis
  - †Calamostachys inversibractis – type locality for species
- †Calceocrinus
- †Calliasterella
  - †Calliasterella americana
- †Calliocrinus
  - †Calliocrinus cornatus
  - †Calliocrinus cornutus
  - †Calliocrinus pentangularis
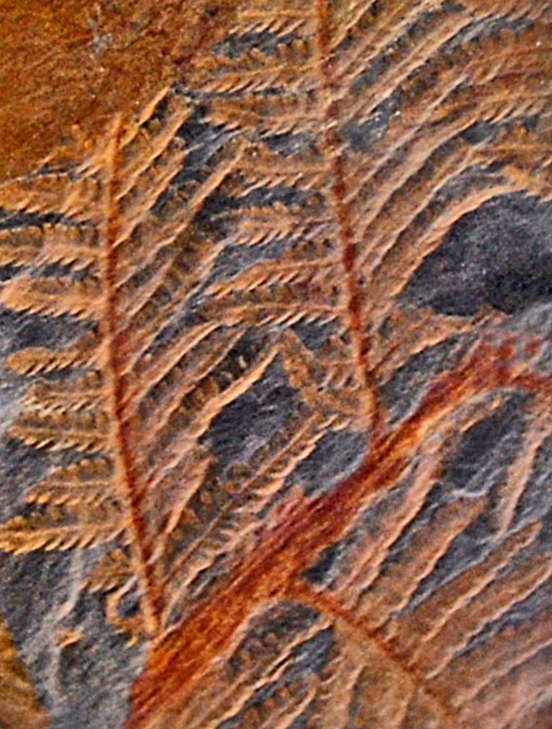
- Fossilized fronds of the Carboniferous seed fern Callipteridium
  †Callipteridium
- †Calvinia
  - †Calvinia edgewoodensis
- †Calymene
  - †Calymene breviceps
  - †Calymene celebra
- †Calyptaulax
  - †Calyptaulax callicephala
- †Camarophorella
  - †Camarophorella buckleyi – or unidentified comparable form
- †Camarotoechia
- †Camerella
- †Camptotriletes
  - †Camptotriletes bucculentus
  - †Camptotriletes triangularis
- †Cancrinella
  - †Cancrinella boonensis
- †Cannophyllites
  - †Cannophyllites abbreviata
  - †Cannophyllites dawsoni
  - †Cannophyllites fasciculata
  - †Cannophyllites marginata
  - †Cannophyllites rectinervis
  - †Cannophyllites southwelli
- †Carbonocoryphe
  - †Carbonocoryphe planucauda
- †Carbonympha – type locality for genus
  - †Carbonympha herdinai – type locality for species
- †Cardiocarpon
- †Cardiopteridium
- †Cardiothyris
  - †Cardiothyris pristina
- †Carpocrinus
- †Caryocrinites
  - †Caryocrinites ornatus – or unidentified comparable form
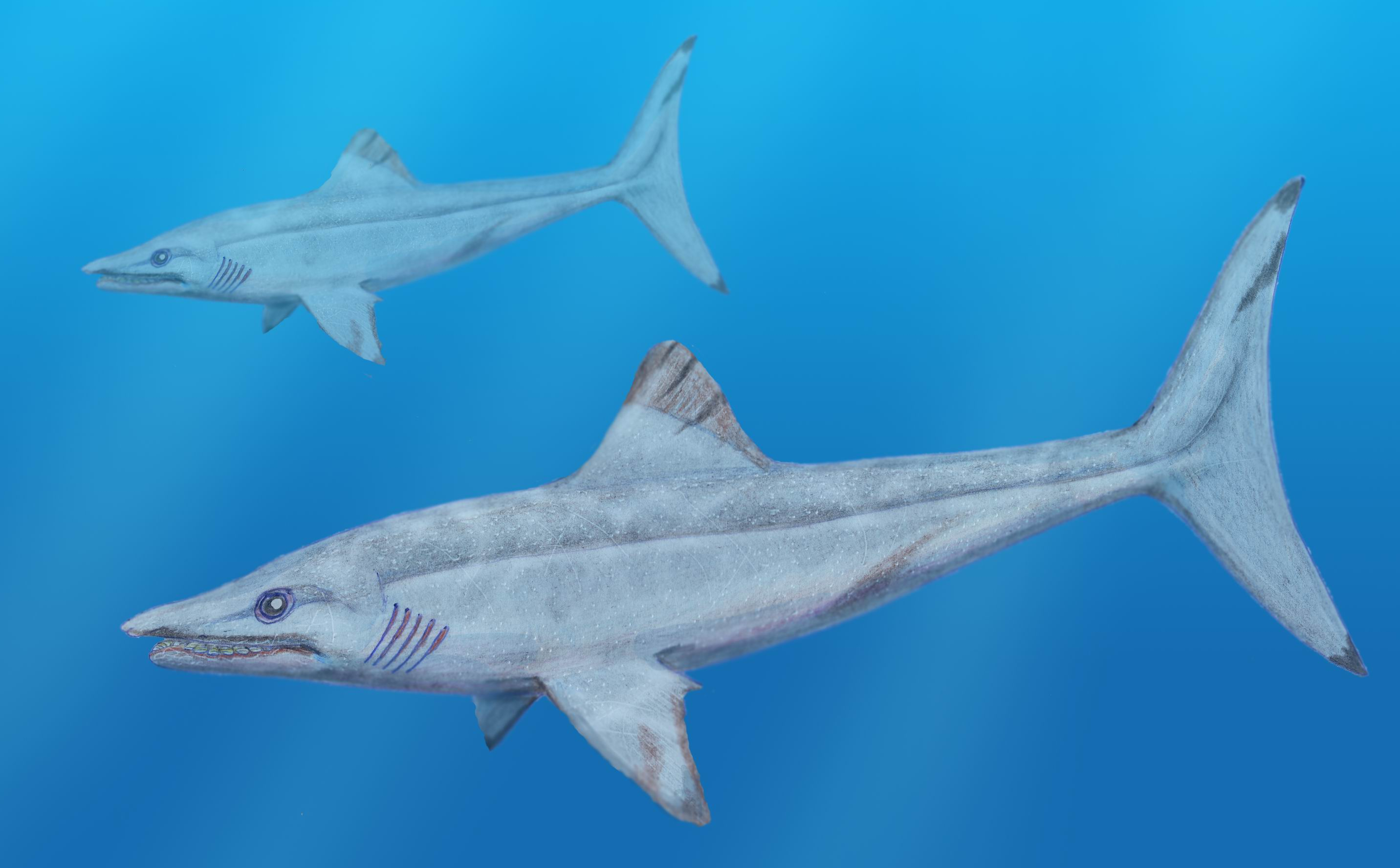
- Life restoration of the Carboniferous Chimaera relative Caseodus
  †Caseodus
  - †Caseodus basalis – type locality for species
- †Catadyesthus
  - †Catadyesthus priscus
- †Caulopteris
- †Cephalerpeton – type locality for genus
  - †Cephalerpeton ventriarmatum – type locality for species
- †Ceratiocaris
  - †Ceratiocaris markhami
- †Ceratocephala
  - †Ceratocephala goniata
- †Ceraurinella
  - †Ceraurinella tenuisculptus
- †Ceraurinus
  - †Ceraurinus platycanthus
- †Cerauromerus
  - †Cerauromerus hydei
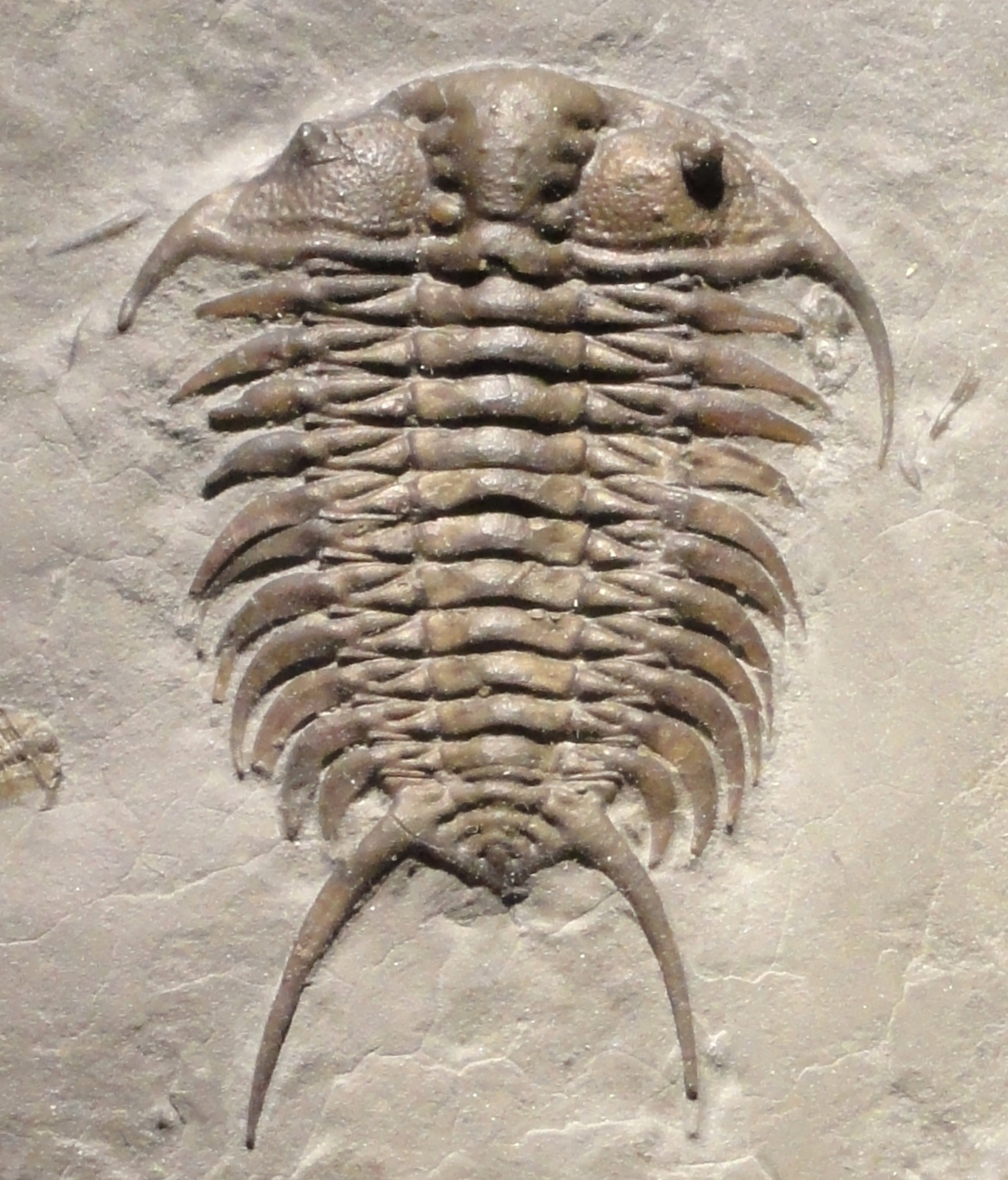
- Fossil of the Middle-Late Ordovician trilobite Ceraurus
  †Ceraurus
  - †Ceraurus globulobatus
  - †Ceraurus pleurexanthemus
- †Cervifurca
  - †Cervifurca nasuta
- †Chaenomya
- †Chaetetes
- †Cheirurus
  - †Cheirurus niagarensis – or unidentified comparable form
  - †Cheirurus patens
- †Cheliphlebia – type locality for genus
  - †Cheliphlebia carbonaria – type locality for species
  - †Cheliphlebia mazona – type locality for species
- †Chenilleophycus
  - †Chenilleophycus godfreyensis
- †Chicagocrinus
  - †Chicagocrinus ornatus
- †Chirodus
  - †Chirodus orbicularis
- †Chlidonocrinus
  - †Chlidonocrinus erectus – type locality for species
- †Chlidophorus
- †Chonetes
  - †Chonetes ornatus
- †Chonetinella
- †Chrestotella
  - †Chrestotella danae – type locality for species
- †Chrestotes – type locality for genus
  - †Chrestotes lapidea – type locality for species
- †Cirratriradites
  - †Cirratriradites annulatus
  - †Cirratriradites annuliformis
  - †Cirratriradites tenuis
- †Clathrocrinus – type locality for genus
  - †Clathrocrinus clathratus – type locality for species
  - †Clathrocrinus clinatus – type locality for species
- †Clathrodictyon
  - †Clathrodictyon vesiculosum
- †Clathrospira
  - †Clathrospira subconica
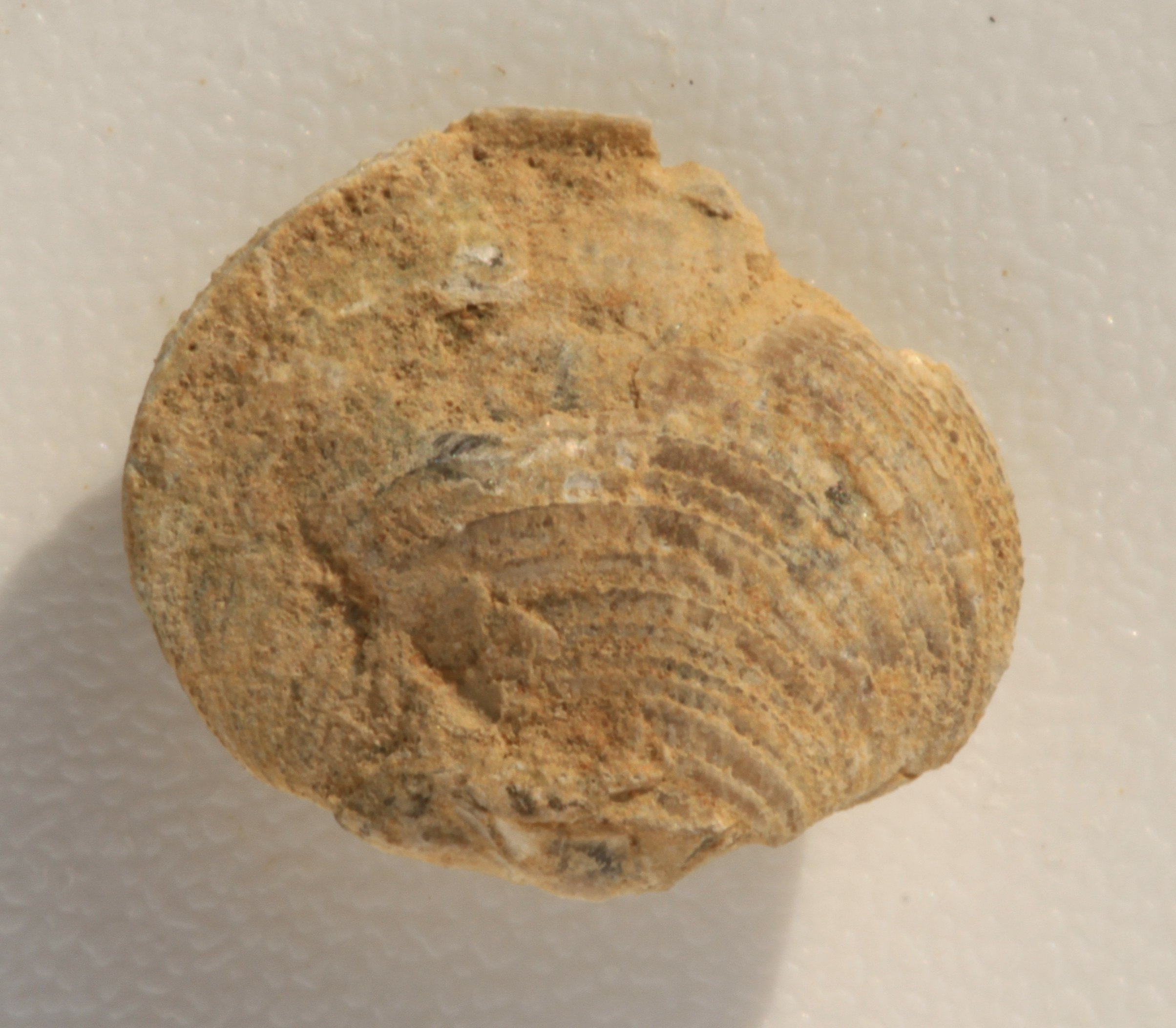
- Fossilized shell of the Middle Devonian-Permian brachiopod Cleiothyridina
  †Cleiothyridina
  - †Cleiothyridina atrypoides
  - †Cleiothyridina sublamellosa
- †Clepsydrops – type locality for genus
  - †Clepsydrops collettii – type locality for species
  - †Clepsydrops vinslovii – type locality for species
- †Cliftonia
  - †Cliftonia tubulistriata
- †Clonocrinus
  - †Clonocrinus chicagoensis
  - †Clonocrinus niagarensis
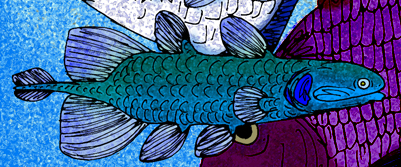
- Life restoration (foreground) of the Permian-Jurassic lobe-finned fish Coelacanthus
  †Coelacanthus
  - †Coelacanthus exiguus
- †Coelocystis
  - †Coelocystis subglobosus
- †Columinisporites
  - †Columinisporites ovalis
- †Complexisporites
  - †Complexisporites chalonerii
- †Composita
  - †Composita argentea
  - †Composita matutina
  - †Composita subtilita
  - †Composita trinuclea
- †Compsaster
  - †Compsaster formosus
- †Condrathyris
  - †Condrathyris perplexa
- †Conocardium
  - †Conocardium chesterensis – type locality for species
- †Contocrinus
  - †Contocrinus coupi – type locality for species
- †Converrucosisporites
  - †Converrucosisporites subverrucosus
- †Convolutispora
  - †Convolutispora florida
  - †Convolutispora fromensis
- †Cooperoceras
- †Cordaianthus
- †Cordaicarpus
- †Cordaicladus
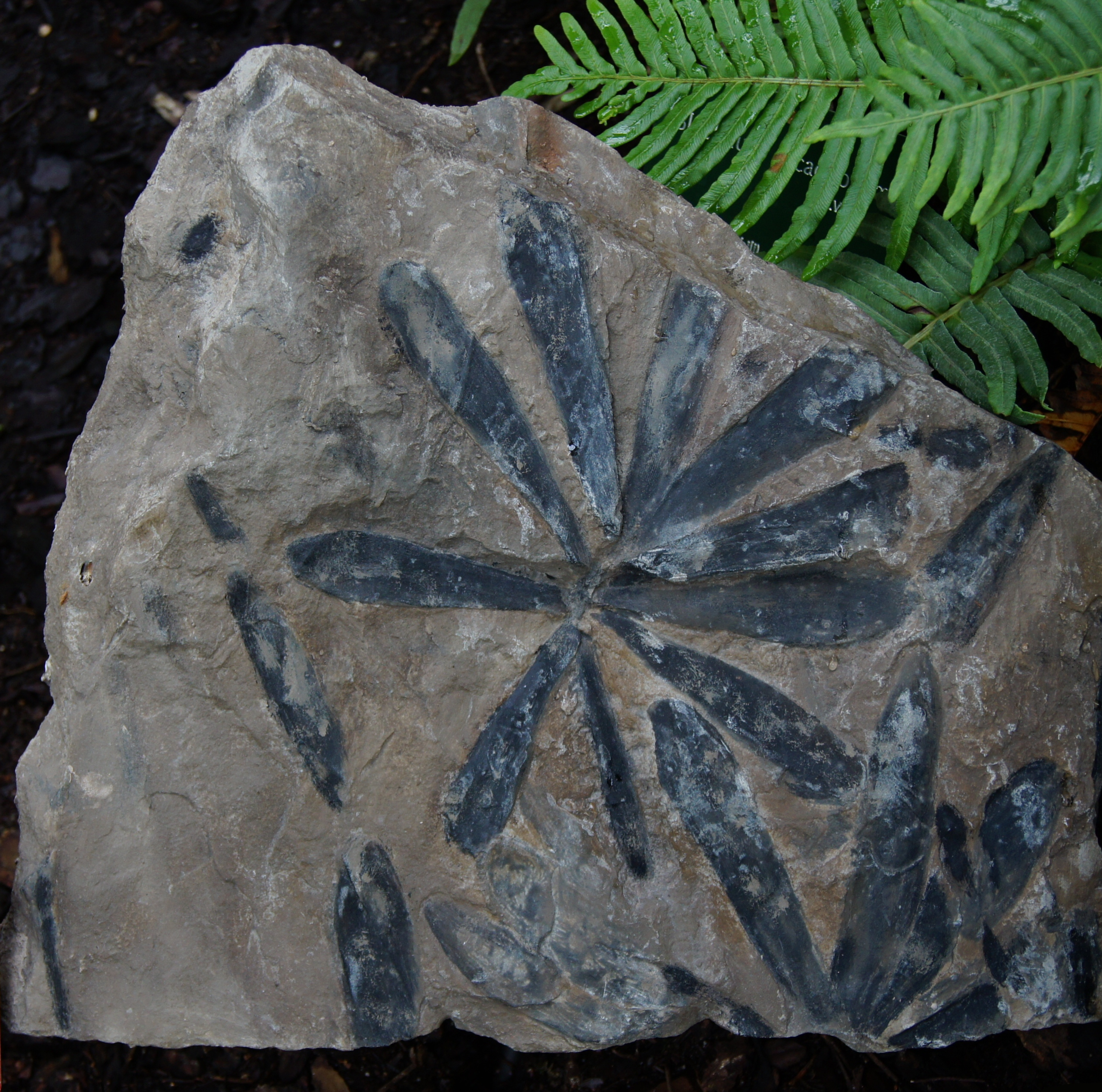
- Fossilized foliage of the Carboniferous-Permian conifer relative Cordaites
  †Cordaites
  - †Cordaites communis
  - †Cordaites principalis
- †Cornulites
- †Corynepteris
  - †Corynepteris erosa – or unidentified comparable form
- †Crania
  - †Crania dodgei
- †Craniops
- †Crassiproetus
  - †Crassiproetus occidens
- †Crassispora
  - †Crassispora kosankei
  - †Crassispora plicata
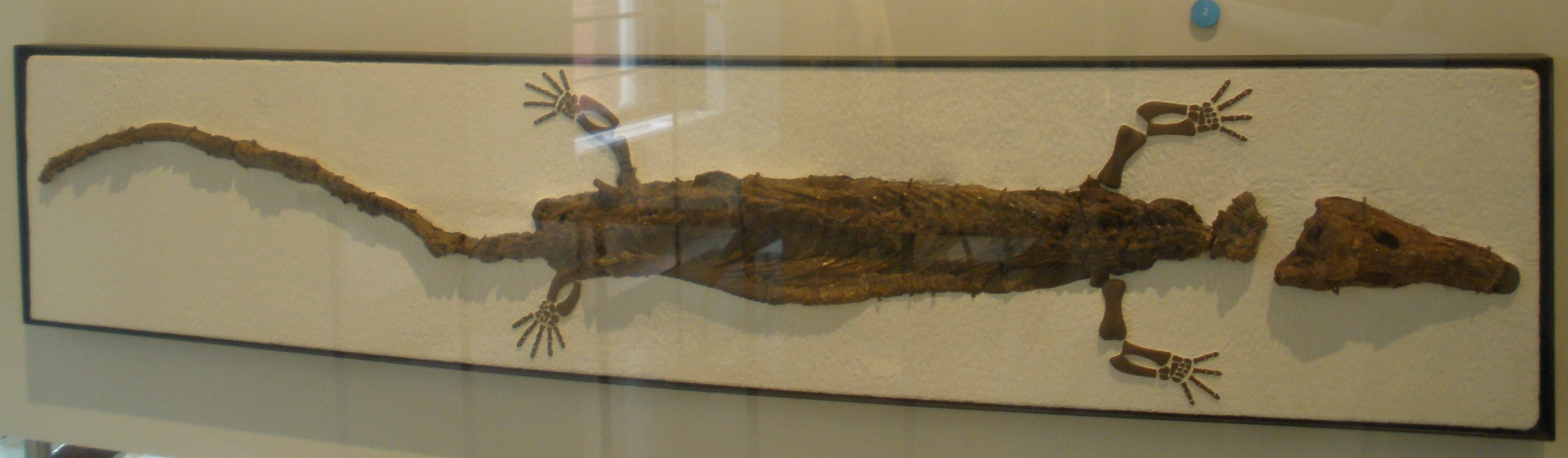
- Fossilized skeleton of the Carboniferous-Permian reptile relative Cricotus
  †Cricotus – type locality for genus
  - †Cricotus heteroclitus – type locality for species
- †Cristatisporites
  - †Cristatisporites alpernii
  - †Cristatisporites indignabundus
- †Crossotheca
- †Crotalocrinites
  - †Crotalocrinites cora
  - †Crotalocrinites vanhornei
- †Crurithyris
  - †Crurithyris levicula – or unidentified comparable form
  - †Crurithyris planoconvexa
- †Cryptothyrella
  - †Cryptothyrella ovoides
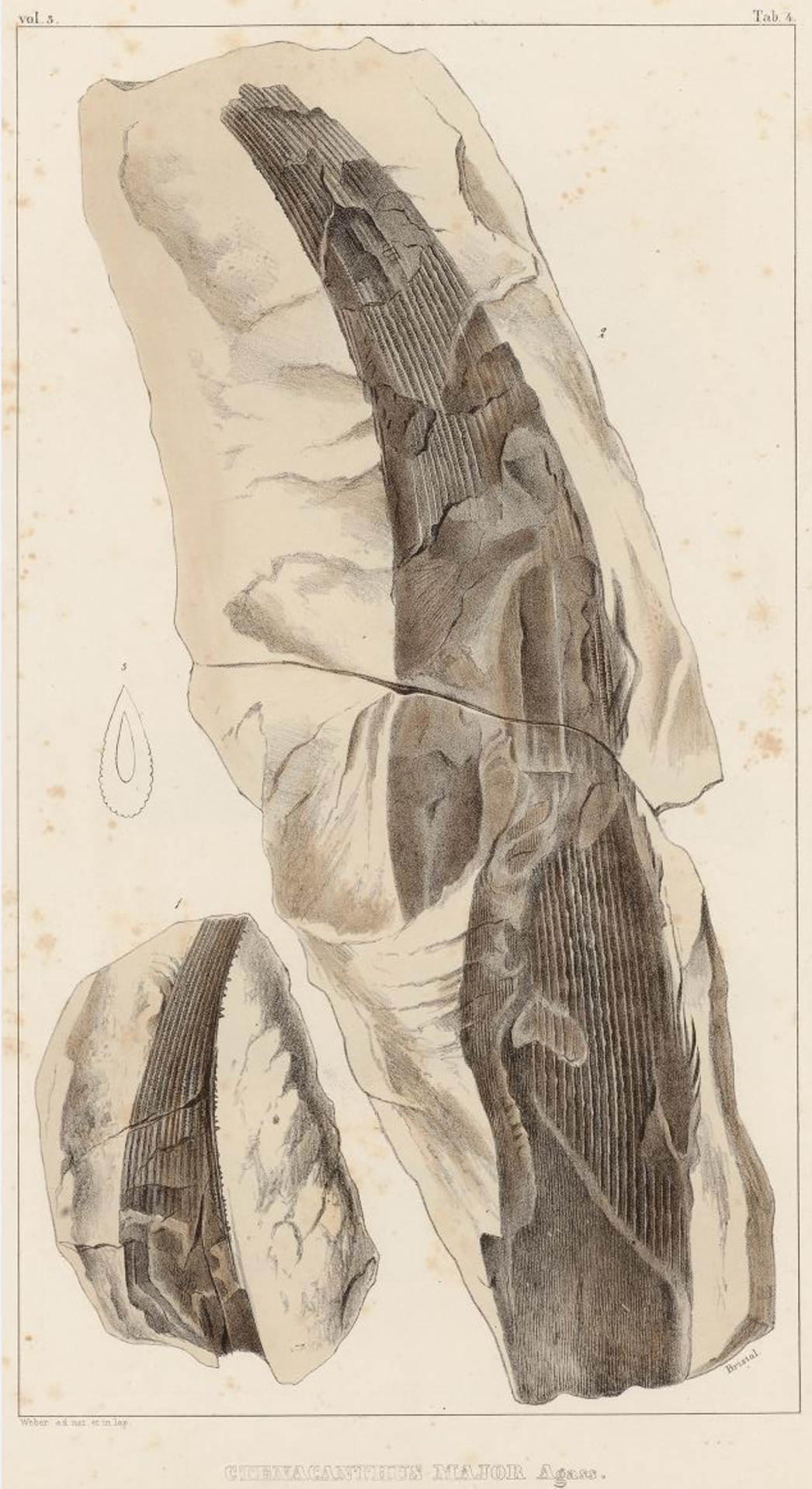
- Fossil of the Carboniferous shark Ctenacanthus
  †Ctenacanthus
  - †Ctenacanthus buttersi – type locality for species
- †Ctenodonta
  - †Ctenodonta concinna
- †Curculioides
  - †Curculioides gigas – type locality for species
  - †Curculioides mcluckiei – type locality for species
  - †Curculioides scaber – type locality for species
- †Curriella – tentative report
- †Cyathocrinites
- †Cyclites
  - †Cyclites globosa – type locality for species
- †Cyclogranisporites
  - †Cyclogranisporites aureus
  - †Cyclogranisporites breviradiata
  - †Cyclogranisporites breviradiatus
  - †Cyclogranisporites leopoldi
  - †Cyclogranisporites micaceus
  - †Cyclogranisporites microgranus
  - †Cyclogranisporites minutus
  - †Cyclogranisporites obliquus
  - †Cyclogranisporites orbicularis
  - †Cyclogranisporites staplini
- †Cyclonema
  - †Cyclonema daytonensis
  - †Cyclonema intermedium
- †Cyclus
  - †Cyclus americanus – type locality for species
- †Cymatospira
  - †Cymatospira welleri
- †Cyperites
- †Cyphaspis
  - †Cyphaspis globosus
  - †Cyphaspis intermedia
- †Cyphocrinus
  - †Cyphocrinus chicagoensis
- †Cypricardella
  - †Cypricardella bellistriata
- †Cyrtia
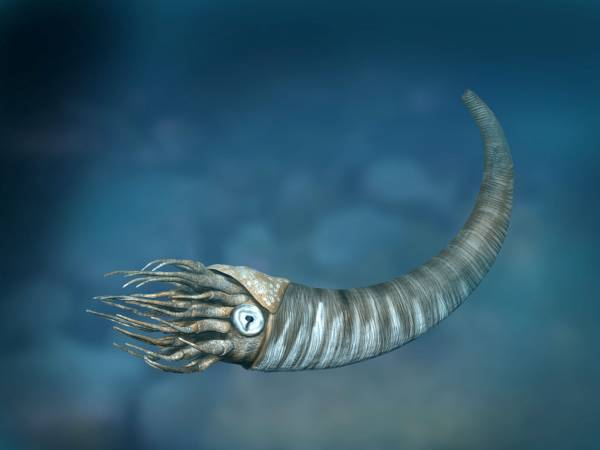
- Restoration of the Cambrian-Middle Devonian nautiloid cephalopod Cyrtoceras
  †Cyrtoceras
- Cytherella
  - †Cytherella glandella
- †Cytherellina
- †Cytherodon – tentative report
  - †Cytherodon appresus
- †Cytocrinus

== D ==
- †Dabasacanthus – type locality for genus
  - †Dabasacanthus inskasi – type locality for species

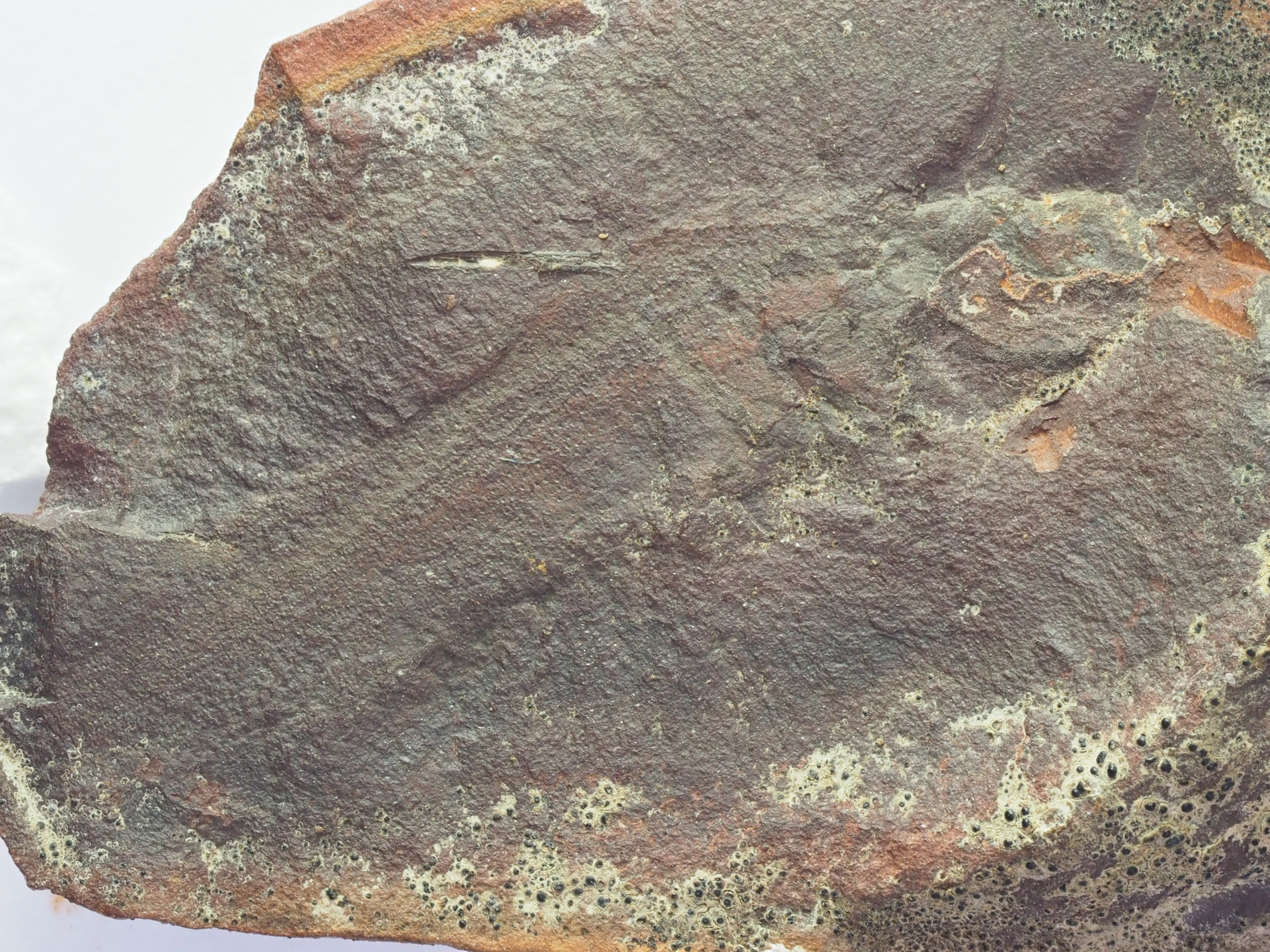
Elasmobranch †Dabasacanthus inskasi Zangerl 1979 from Mazon Creek

- †Dactylotheca
  - †Dactylotheca aspera
- †Dalejina
- †Dalmanella
  - †Dalmanella edgewoodensis
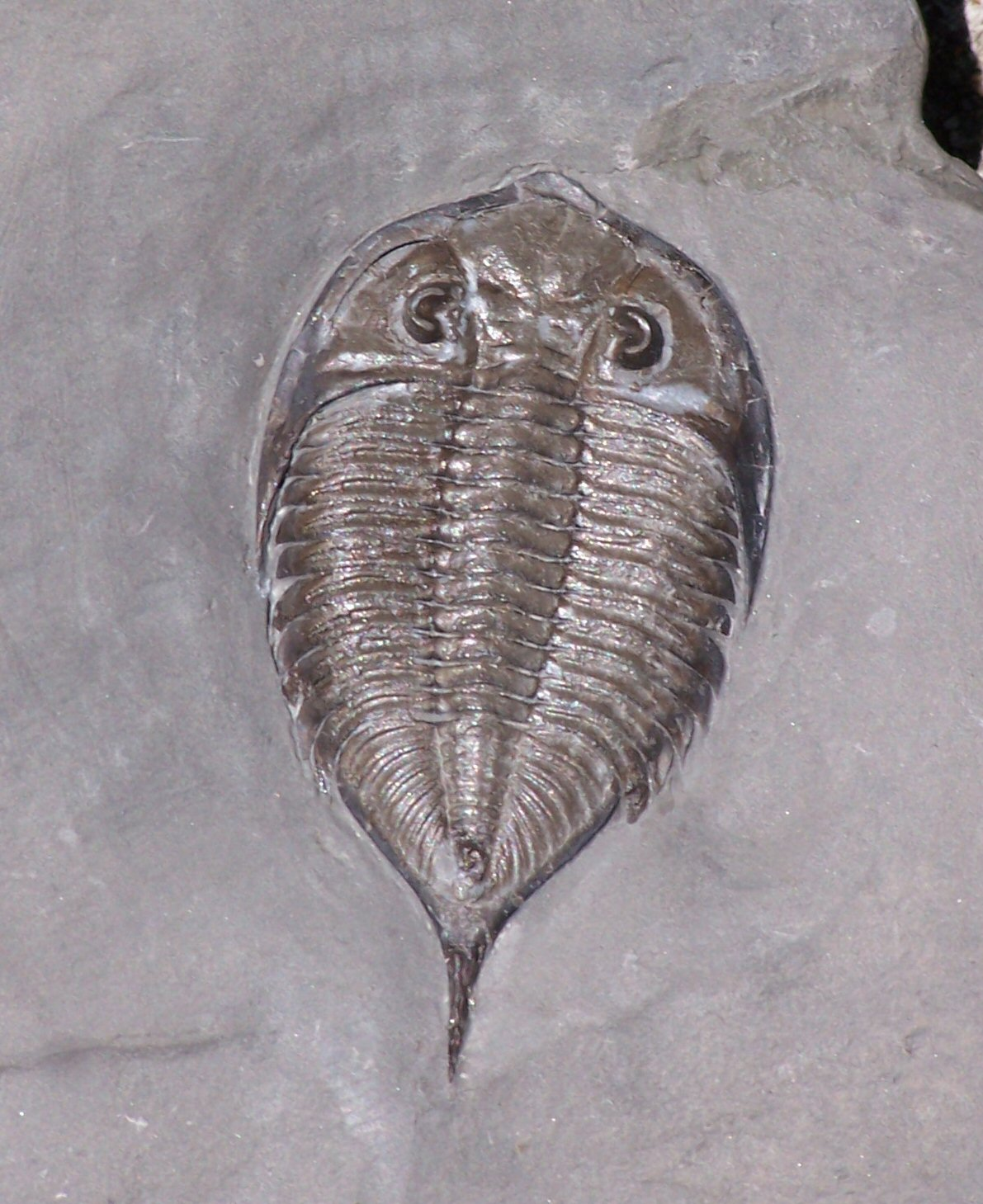
- Fossil of the Late Ordovician-Middle Devonian trilobite Dalmanites
  †Dalmanites
  - †Dalmanites danai
  - †Dalmanites illinoisensis
  - †Dalmanites obex
  - †Dalmanites platycaudatus
- †Danielsiella – type locality for genus
  - †Danielsiella priscula – type locality for species
- †Dasciocrinus
  - †Dasciocrinus spinifer
- †Dasyleptus
- †Dawsonoceras
- †Decoroproetus
- †Deiphon
  - †Deiphon americanus
- †Delicaster – type locality for genus
  - †Delicaster enigmaticus
- †Delthyris
- †Deltoidospora
  - †Deltoidospora levis
  - †Deltoidospora priddyi
  - †Deltoidospora sphaerotriangula
- †Denayella
  - †Denayella rotalia – or unidentified comparable form
- †Densosporites
  - †Densosporites annulatus
  - †Densosporites lobatus – or unidentified comparable form
  - †Densosporites ruhus
  - †Densosporites sinuosus
  - †Densosporites sphaerotriangularis
  - †Densosporites triangularis
- †Derbyia
  - †Derbyia crassa
- †Derbyoides
  - †Derbyoides nebrascensis
- †Desmograptus
  - †Desmograptus micronematodes
- †Desmopteris
- †Devonatrypa
- †Devononema – type locality for genus
  - †Devononema typicum – type locality for species
- †Diagonodictya – type locality for genus
  - †Diagonodictya crusta – type locality for species
- †Diamphidiocystis
  - †Diamphidiocystis drepanon
- †Diaphorodendron
  - †Diaphorodendron rimosum
- †Diaphragmus
  - †Diaphragmus fasciculatus
- †Dicalamophyllum
  - †Dicalamophyllum americanum
- †Dichocrinus
  - †Dichocrinus nola – type locality for species
- †Dicksonites
- †Dicoelosia
- †Dicranopeltis
  - †Dicranopeltis decipiens
- †Dictyoclostus
  - †Dictyoclostus inflatus
- †Dictyomonolites
  - †Dictyomonolites swadei
- †Dictyonema
  - †Dictyonema crassibasale
  - †Dictyonema retiforme
  - †Dictyonema tenellum
- †Dictyophlois
  - †Dictyophlois reticulata var. illinoisensis
- †Dictyotomaria
  - †Dictyotomaria depressus – type locality for species
  - †Dictyotomaria wortheni – type locality for species
  - †Dictyotomaria yochelsoni
- †Dictyotriletes
  - †Dictyotriletes bireticulatus
  - †Dictyotriletes danvillensis
  - †Dictyotriletes densoreticulatus
  - †Dictyotriletes distortus
  - †Dictyotriletes falsus – or unidentified comparable form
  - †Dictyotriletes reticulocingulum – or unidentified comparable form
- †Dictyoxylon – or unidentified comparable form
- †Dieconeura – type locality for genus
  - †Dieconeura arcuata – type locality for species
  - †Dieconeura mazona – type locality for species
- †Dielasmella
  - †Dielasmella compressa
- †Diexodus – type locality for genus
  - †Diexodus debilis – type locality for species
- †Dimerocrinites
  - †Dimerocrinites occidentalis
  - †Dimerocrinites pentangularis
- †Dinobolus
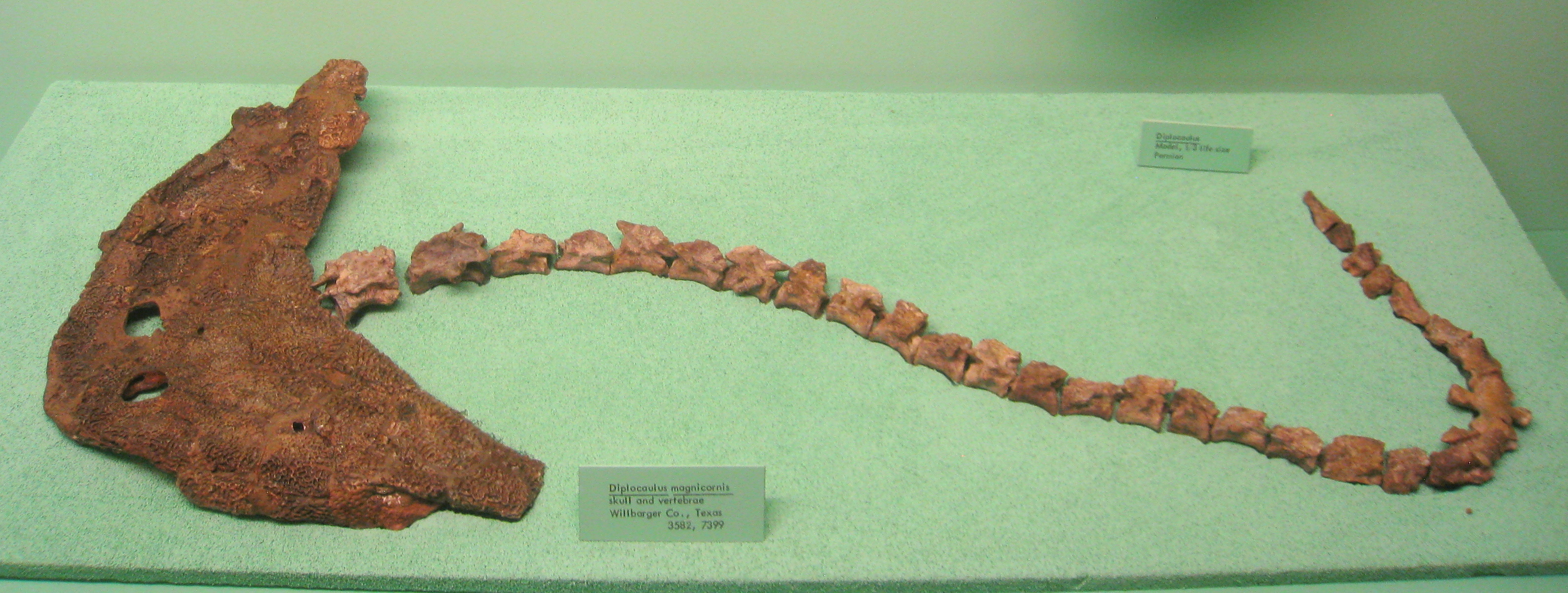
- Fossilized axial skeleton of the Carboniferous-Permian amphibian Diplocaulus
  †Diplocaulus – type locality for genus
  - †Diplocaulus salamandroides – type locality for species
- †Diplothmema
  - †Diplothmema cheathami
- †Discotarbus – type locality for genus
  - †Discotarbus deplanatus – type locality for species
- †Distortitisporites
  - †Distortitisporites illinoiensis
- †Ditomopyge
  - †Ditomopyge scitula
- †Dolichoharpes
  - †Dolichoharpes uniserialis
- †Domatoceras
  - †Domatoceras mattoonense – type locality for species
  - †Domatoceras wortheni – type locality for species
- †Donaldina
  - †Donaldina americana
  - †Donaldina fountainensis – type locality for species
  - †Donaldina marigoldensis
  - †Donaldina pygmaea – type locality for species
- †Dorycrinus
  - †Dorycrinus mississippiensis
- †Dragonympha – type locality for genus
  - †Dragonympha srokai – type locality for species
- †Dudleyaspis
  - †Dudleyaspis vanhornei

== E ==
- †Echinaria
- †Echinoconchus
  - †Echinoconchus alternatus
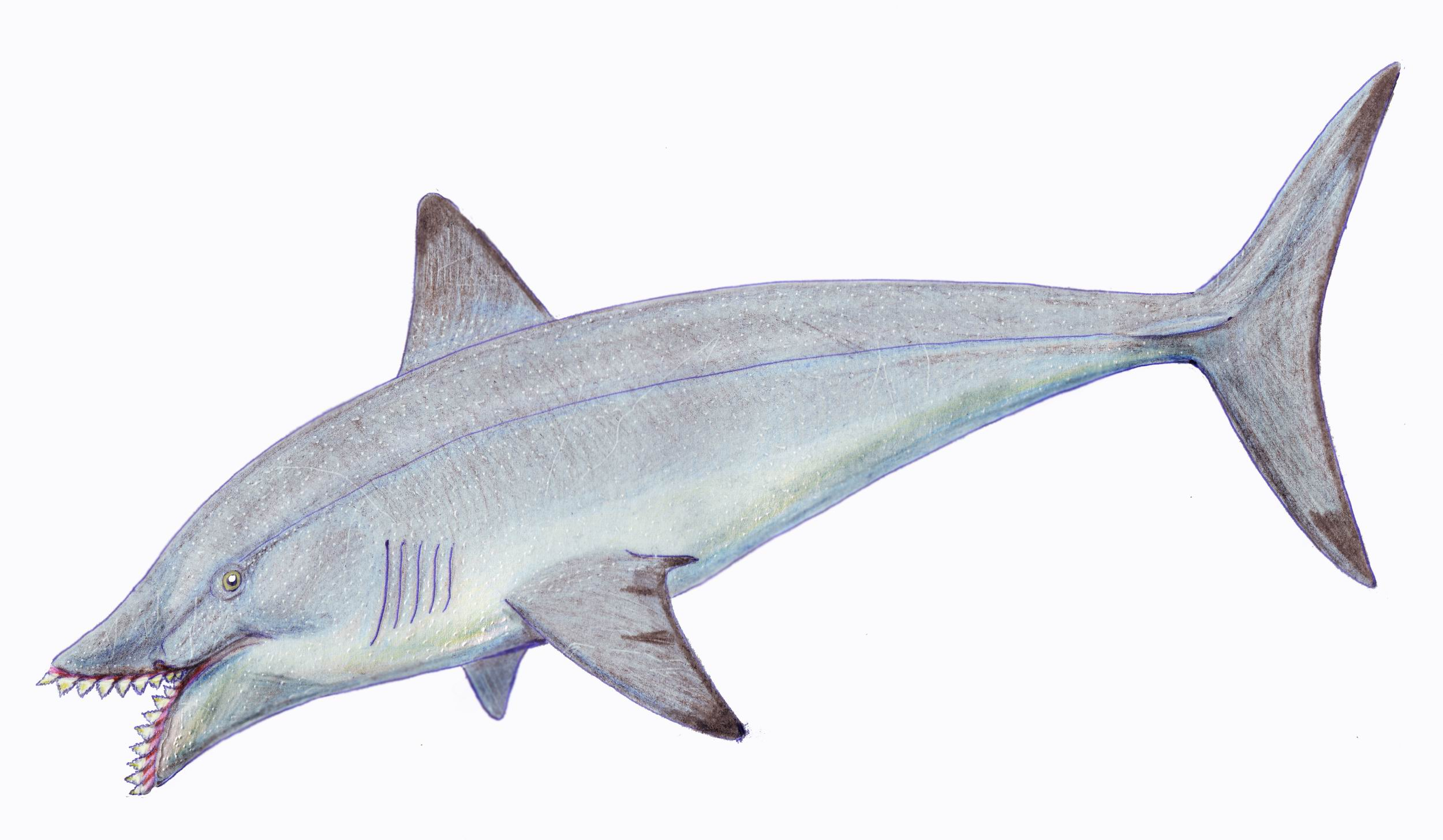
- Life restoration of the Late Devonian-Carboniferous Chimaera relative Edestus
  †Edestus
  - †Edestus crenulatus – type locality for species
  - †Edestus serratus – type locality for species
- †Edmondia
  - †Edmondia ovata
- †Eileticus – type locality for genus
  - †Eileticus aequalis – type locality for species
  - †Eileticus anthracinus – type locality for species
- †Elasmonema
  - †Elasmonema corrugata
- †Elaterites
  - †Elaterites triferens
- †Elibatocrinus
  - †Elibatocrinus elegans – type locality for species
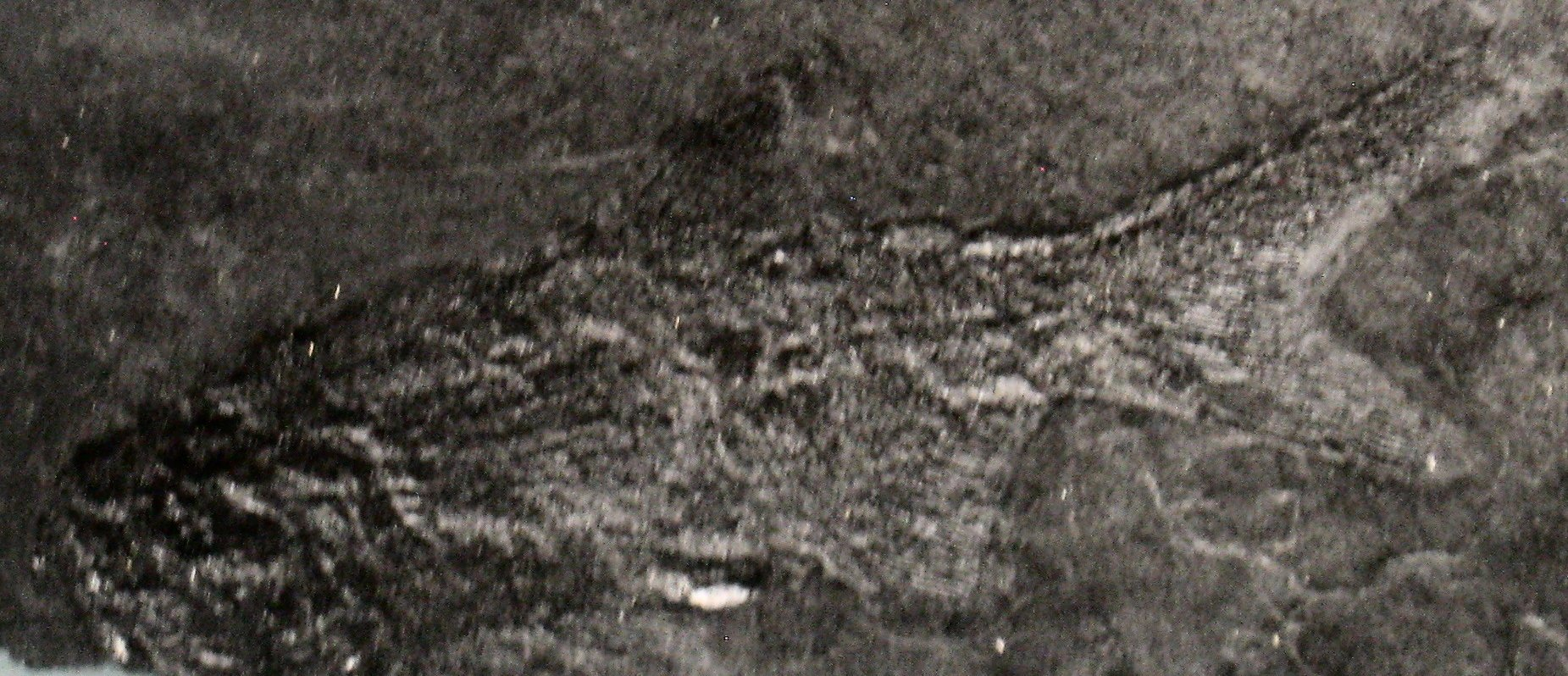
- Fossilized skeleton of the Carboniferous-Permian bony fish Elonichthys
  †Elonichthys
  - †Elonichthys disjunctus – type locality for species
  - †Elonichthys peltigerus
  - †Elonichthys perpennatus
- †Encrinurus
  - †Encrinurus egani
- †Endelocrinus
  - †Endelocrinus tumidus
- †Endoiasmus – type locality for genus
  - †Endoiasmus reticulatus – type locality for species
- †Endosporites
  - †Endosporites globiformis
  - †Endosporites plicatus
- †Enoploura
- †Enteletes
  - †Enteletes hemiplicata
- †Eoasinites
- †Eobronteus
  - †Eobronteus slocomi
- †Eoctonus – type locality for genus
  - †Eoctonus miniatus – type locality for species
- †Eodictyonella
- †Eohalysiocrinus – tentative report
- †Eolissochonetes
- †Eomartiniopsis
  - †Eomartiniopsis kinderhookensis
- †Eophacops
  - †Eophacops handwerki
- †Eoplectodonta
- †Eoscorpius – type locality for genus
  - †Eoscorpius carbonarius – type locality for species
- †Eospirifer
  - †Eospirifer radiatus
- †Eospirigerina
  - †Eospirigerina putilla
- †Eotrochus
  - †Eotrochus marigoldensis
- †Ephippioceras
  - †Ephippioceras moinellae – type locality for species
- †Epideigma – type locality for genus
  - †Epideigma elegans – type locality for species
- †Eremopteris
  - †Eremopteris grandis
  - †Eremopteris inaequilateralis
- †Erisocrinus
  - †Erisocrinus typus
- †Erratencrinurus
  - †Erratencrinurus vigilans
- †Escharopora
  - †Escharopora patens
- †Eubleptus – type locality for genus
  - †Eubleptus danielsi – type locality for species
  - †Eubleptus maculosus – type locality for species
- †Eubrodia – type locality for genus
  - †Eubrodia dabasinskasi – type locality for species
- †Eucaenus – type locality for genus
  - †Eucaenus ovalis – type locality for species
  - †Eucaenus pusillus – type locality for species
  - †Eucaenus rotundatus – type locality for species
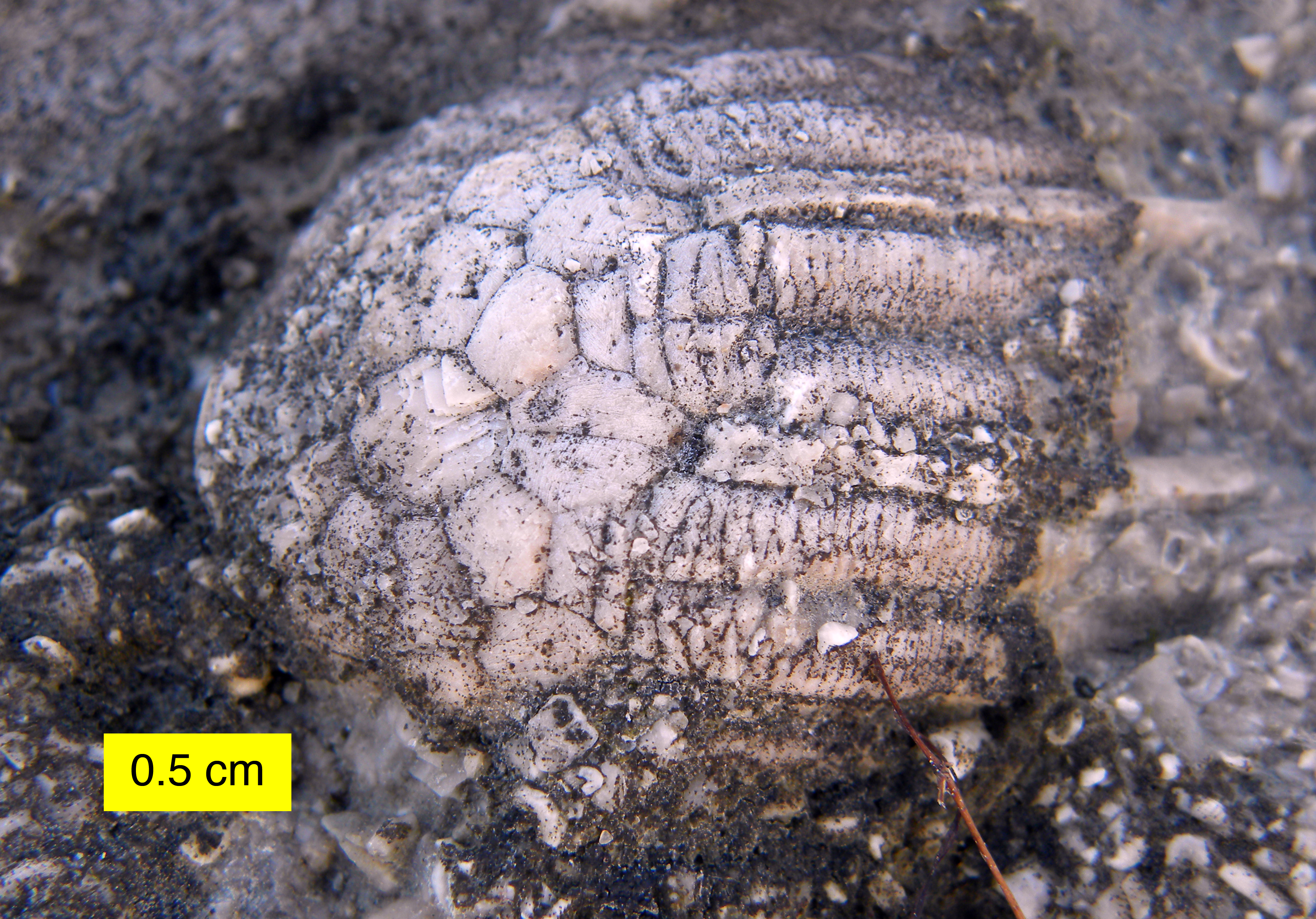
- Fossilized calyx of the Silurian-Middle Devonian crinoid ("sea lily") Eucalyptocrinites
  †Eucalyptocrinites
  - †Eucalyptocrinites asper
  - †Eucalyptocrinites crassus
  - †Eucalyptocrinites depressus
  - †Eucalyptocrinites egani
  - †Eucalyptocrinites inornatus
  - †Eucalyptocrinites ornatus
  - †Eucalyptocrinites rotundus
- †Euchondria
  - †Euchondria levicula
- †Euconospira
  - †Euconospira sturgeoni
  - †Euconospira waterlooensis – type locality for species
- †Eudoxina
  - †Eudoxina subrotunda
- †Euhydrodiskos – type locality for genus
  - †Euhydrodiskos diktyotos – type locality for species
- †Eumetria
  - †Eumetria vera
- †Eumicrerpeton – type locality for genus
  - †Eumicrerpeton parvum – type locality for species
- †Eunema
  - †Eunema centralis – type locality for species
  - †Eunema fasciata – type locality for species
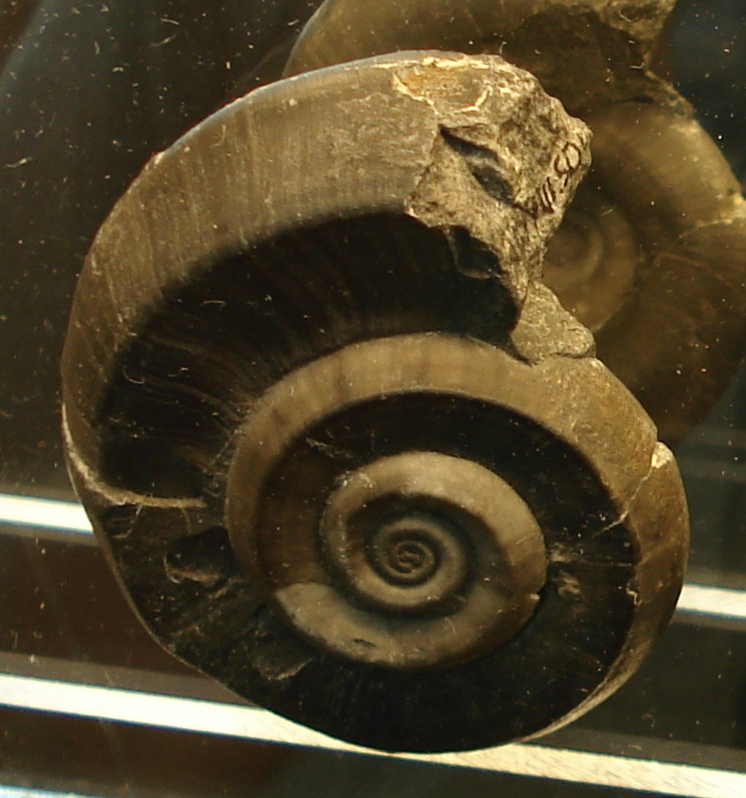
- Fossilized shell of the Silurian-Permian sea snail Euomphalus
  †Euomphalus
  - †Euomphalus planodorsatus
  - †Euomphalus similis
- †Euonychocrinus
  - †Euonychocrinus simplex – type locality for species
- †Euphemerites
  - †Euphemerites affinis – type locality for species
  - †Euphemerites gigas – type locality for species
  - †Euphemerites simplex – type locality for species
- †Euphemites
  - †Euphemites callosus – type locality for species
  - †Euphemites carbonarius
  - †Euphemites lentiformis – type locality for species
  - †Euphemites randolphensis – type locality for species
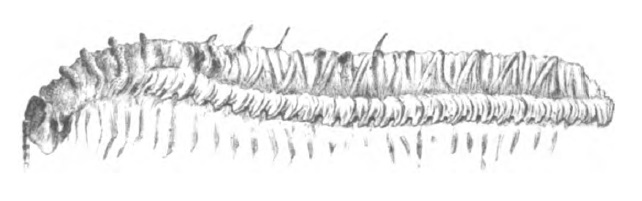
- Illustration of fossil of the Carboniferous millipede Euphoberia
  †Euphoberia – type locality for genus
  - †Euphoberia anguilla – type locality for species
  - †Euphoberia armigera – type locality for species
  - †Euphoberia carri – type locality for species
  - †Euphoberia cuspidata – type locality for species
  - †Euphoberia flabellata – type locality for species
  - †Euphoberia granosa
  - †Euphoberia horrida – type locality for species
  - †Euphoberia hystricosa – type locality for species
  - †Euphoberia simplex – type locality for species
  - †Euphoberia spinulosa – type locality for species
  - †Euphoberia tracta – type locality for species
- †Euryzone
  - †Euryzone latitornata
- †Eusphenopteris
  - †Eusphenopteris morrowensis
- †Exallaspis
  - †Exallaspis illinoisensis
- †Exocrinus
  - †Exocrinus wanni
- †Exoriocrinus – type locality for genus
  - †Exoriocrinus lasallensis

== F ==
- †Fasciculiconcha
  - †Fasciculiconcha knighti
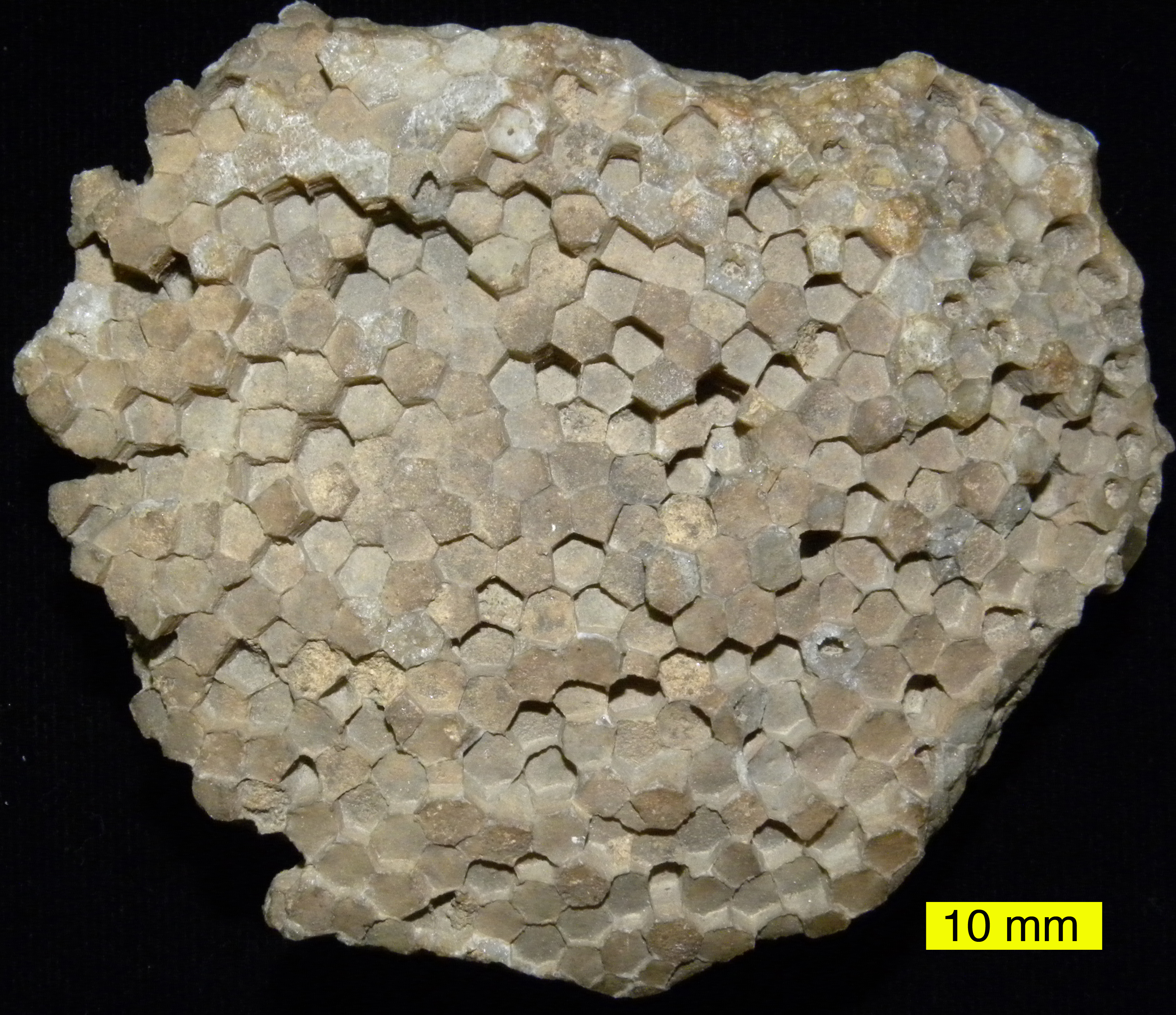
- Fossil of the Late Ordovician-Permian tabulate coral Favosites
  †Favosites
- †Fenestella
- †Ferganella
- †Fistulipora
  - †Fistulipora excellens
  - †Fistulipora incrustans
  - †Fistulipora perdensa
- †Fletcheria
- †Florinites
  - †Florinites antiquus
  - †Florinites grandis
  - †Florinites mediapudens
  - †Florinites mediaudens
  - †Florinites millotti
  - †Florinites similis
  - †Florinites triletus
  - †Florinites visendus
  - †Florinites volans
- †Fraipontia
  - †Fraipontia bella – type locality for species

== G ==
- †Galateacrinus
  - †Galateacrinus coacervatus – type locality for species
- †Gazacrinus
  - †Gazacrinus major
  - †Gazacrinus minor
- †Genentomum – type locality for genus
  - †Genentomum validum – type locality for species
- †Geralinura
  - †Geralinura carbonaria – type locality for species
- †Gerapompus
  - †Gerapompus blattinoides – type locality for species
  - †Gerapompus extensus – type locality for species
  - †Gerapompus schucherti – type locality for species
- †Geraroides
  - †Geraroides maximus – type locality for species
- †Gerarulus – type locality for genus
  - †Gerarulus radialis – type locality for species
- †Gerarus – type locality for genus
  - †Gerarus collaris – type locality for species
  - †Gerarus constrictus – type locality for species
  - †Gerarus danielsi – type locality for species
  - †Gerarus mazonus – type locality for species
  - †Gerarus vetus – type locality for species
- †Geratarbus – type locality for genus
  - †Geratarbus lacoei – type locality for species
- †Gigantopteris
  - †Gigantopteris dawsoni
  - †Gigantopteris ovata
- †Girtyella
  - †Girtyella indianensis
- †Girtyspira
  - †Girtyspira canaliculata
  - †Girtyspira pygmaea – type locality for species
- †Gissocrinus
- †Glabrocingulum
  - †Glabrocingulum chesterensis
  - †Glabrocingulum grayvillense
- †Glaphyrophlebia – type locality for genus
  - †Glaphyrophlebia pusilla – type locality for species
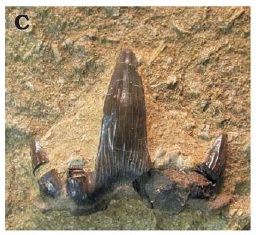
- Fossilized tooth of the Carboniferous shark Glikmanius
  †Glikmanius
  - †Glikmanius occidentalis
- †Globozyga
  - †Globozyga tenuistriata
- †Glyptambon
  - †Glyptambon verrucosus
- †Glyptopleura
  - †Glyptopleura costata
- †Gomphocystites
- †Gondolella
  - †Gondolella pohli
- †Gonioloboceras
  - †Gonioloboceras parrishi – type locality for species
- †Goniophora – tentative report
- †Gosseletina
  - †Gosseletina johnsoni
  - †Gosseletina subglobosa
- †Grabauphyllum
  - †Grabauphyllum johnstoni
- †Graeophonus
  - †Graeophonus scudderi – type locality for species
- †Granasporites
  - †Granasporites medius
- †Granulatispoites
  - †Granulatispoites piroformis
- †Granulatisporites
  - †Granulatisporites adnatoides
  - †Granulatisporites granularis
  - †Granulatisporites granulatus
  - †Granulatisporites livingstonensis
  - †Granulatisporites microgranifer
  - †Granulatisporites minutus
  - †Granulatisporites pallidus
  - †Granulatisporites pannosites
  - †Granulatisporites parvus – or unidentified comparable form
  - †Granulatisporites piroformis
  - †Granulatisporites verrucosus
- †Greenops
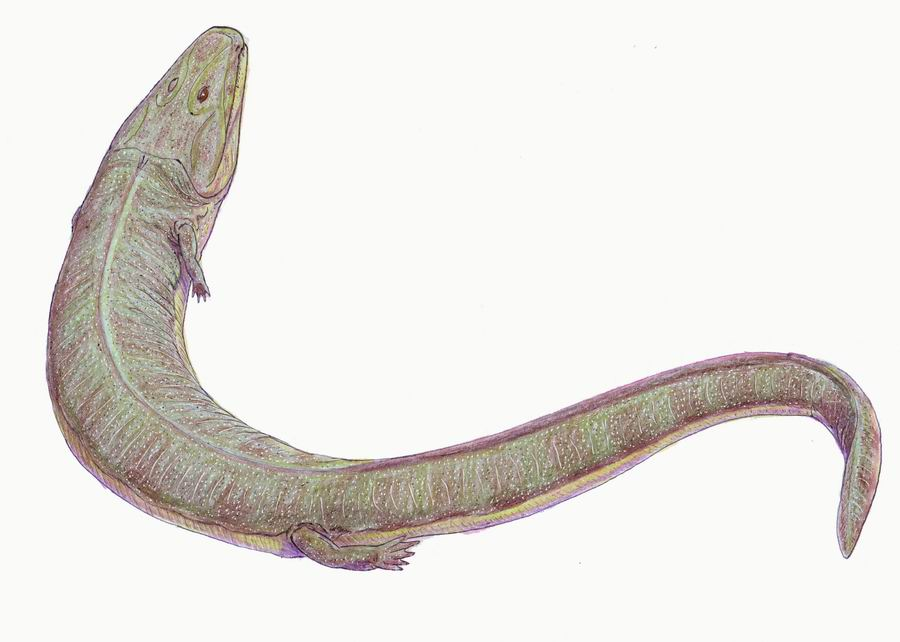
- Life restoration of the Carboniferous four-limbed animal precursor Greererpeton
  †Greererpeton
  - †Greererpeton burkmorani
- †Griffithidella
  - †Griffithidella alternata
  - †Griffithidella doris
- †Grumosisporites
  - †Grumosisporites rufus – or unidentified comparable form
  - †Grumosisporites varioreticulatus
- †Gulpenia
  - †Gulpenia limburgensis
- †Gypidula
- †Gyrophlebia – type locality for genus
  - †Gyrophlebia longicollis – type locality for species

== H ==
- †Hadentomum – type locality for genus
  - †Hadentomum americanum – type locality for species
- †Hadrachne – type locality for genus
  - †Hadrachne horribilis – type locality for species
- †Haeretocrinus
  - †Haeretocrinus macoupinesis
  - †Haeretocrinus wagneri – type locality for species
- †Hagnocrinus – tentative report
  - †Hagnocrinus dubius
- †Hallicystis
  - †Hallicystis elongata
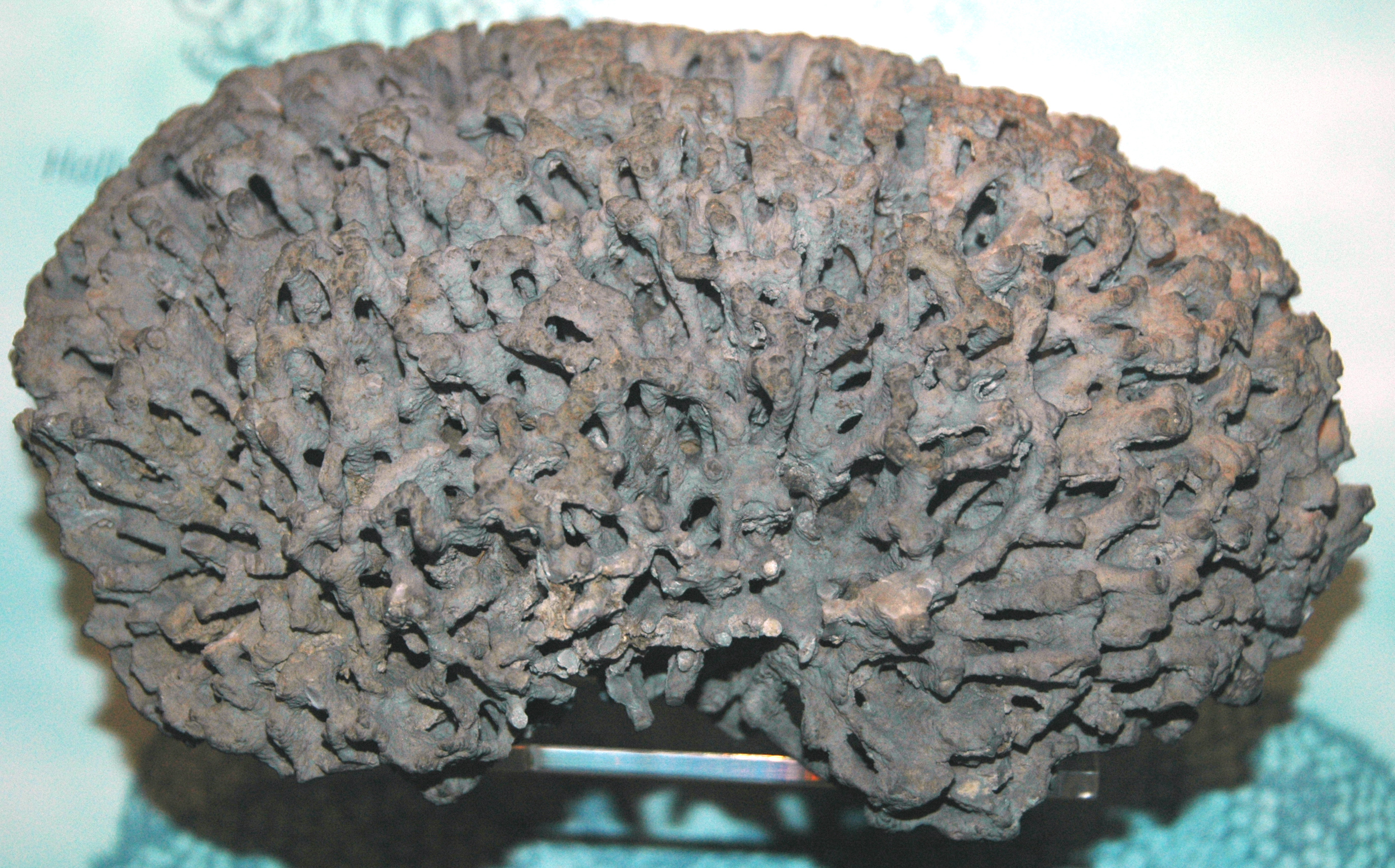
- Fossil of the Ordovician bryozoan ("moss animal") Hallopora
  †Hallopora – tentative report
- †Halogetocrinus – type locality for genus
  - †Halogetocrinus paucus
- †Halysites
- †Hamburgia
  - †Hamburgia typa
- †Harmostocrinus – type locality for genus
  - †Harmostocrinus porosus – type locality for species
- †Harpidella
- †Harpidium
- †Hebertella
- †Hedeina
- †Helenodora – type locality for genus
  - †Helenodora inopinata – type locality for species
- †Helicotoma
  - †Helicotoma planulata
- †Heliolites
- †Heliomeroides
  - †Heliomeroides raymondi
- †Hemeristia – type locality for genus
  - †Hemeristia occidentalis – type locality for species
- †Hemiarges
- †Herdina – type locality for genus
  - †Herdina mirificus – type locality for species
- †Heslerodus
  - †Heslerodus divergens
- †Hesperorthis
- †Heteralosia
  - †Heteralosia beecheri
- †Heterologus – type locality for genus
  - †Heterologus langfordorum – type locality for species
- †Heterotarbus – type locality for genus
  - †Heterotarbus ovatus – type locality for species
- †Hexacrinites
  - †Hexacrinites mississippiensis – type locality for species
- †Holcospermum
- †Holia
  - †Holia magnaspina
- †Holocystites
  - †Holocystites alternatus
  - †Holocystites cylindricus
  - †Holocystites scutellatus – type locality for species
  - †Holocystites spangleri
  - †Holocystites sphaericus
- †Homaloneura
  - †Homaloneura dabasinskasi – type locality for species
- †Homocrinus – tentative report
- †Homoeospira
- †Homotelus
  - †Homotelus laeviurus
- †Howellella
- †Hustedia
  - †Hustedia marmoni
- †Hybochilocrinus
  - †Hybochilocrinus americanus
- †Hymenospora
  - †Hymenospora multirugosa
  - †Hymenospora paucirugosa

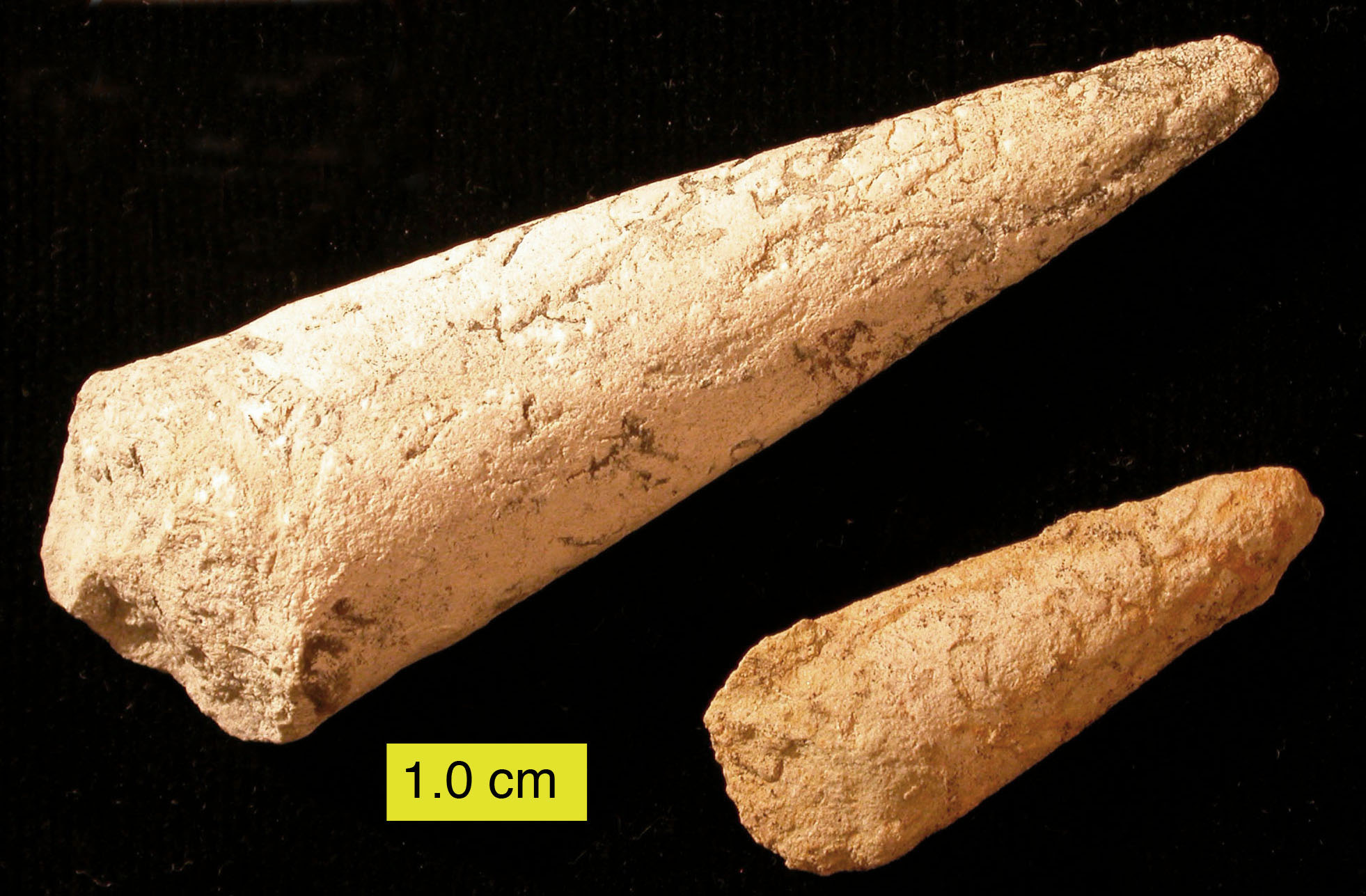
Fossilized shells of the Cambrian-Permian brachiopod relative Hyolitha

†Hyolithes

  - †Hyolithes striatus
- †Hypergonia
  - †Hypergonia baldwinensis
  - †Hypergonia illinoiensis – type locality for species
  - †Hypergonia marvinwelleri
- †Hypermegethes – type locality for genus
  - †Hypermegethes schucherti – type locality for species
- †Hypselocrinus
  - †Hypselocrinus maccabei
- †Hystrichopsydrax – type locality for genus
  - †Hystrichopsydrax sandersi – type locality for species
- †Hystriculina
  - †Hystriculina texana

== I ==
- †Ianthinopsis – tentative report
- †Icthyocrinus
  - †Icthyocrinus subangularis
- †Illaenoides
  - †Illaenoides triloba
- †Ilyodes
  - †Ilyodes divisa – type locality for species
  - †Ilyodes elongata – type locality for species
- †Indospora
  - †Indospora boletus
  - †Indospora stewarti
- †Ischadites
  - †Ischadites koenigi
- †Isoallagecrinus
  - †Isoallagecrinus lasallensis – type locality for species
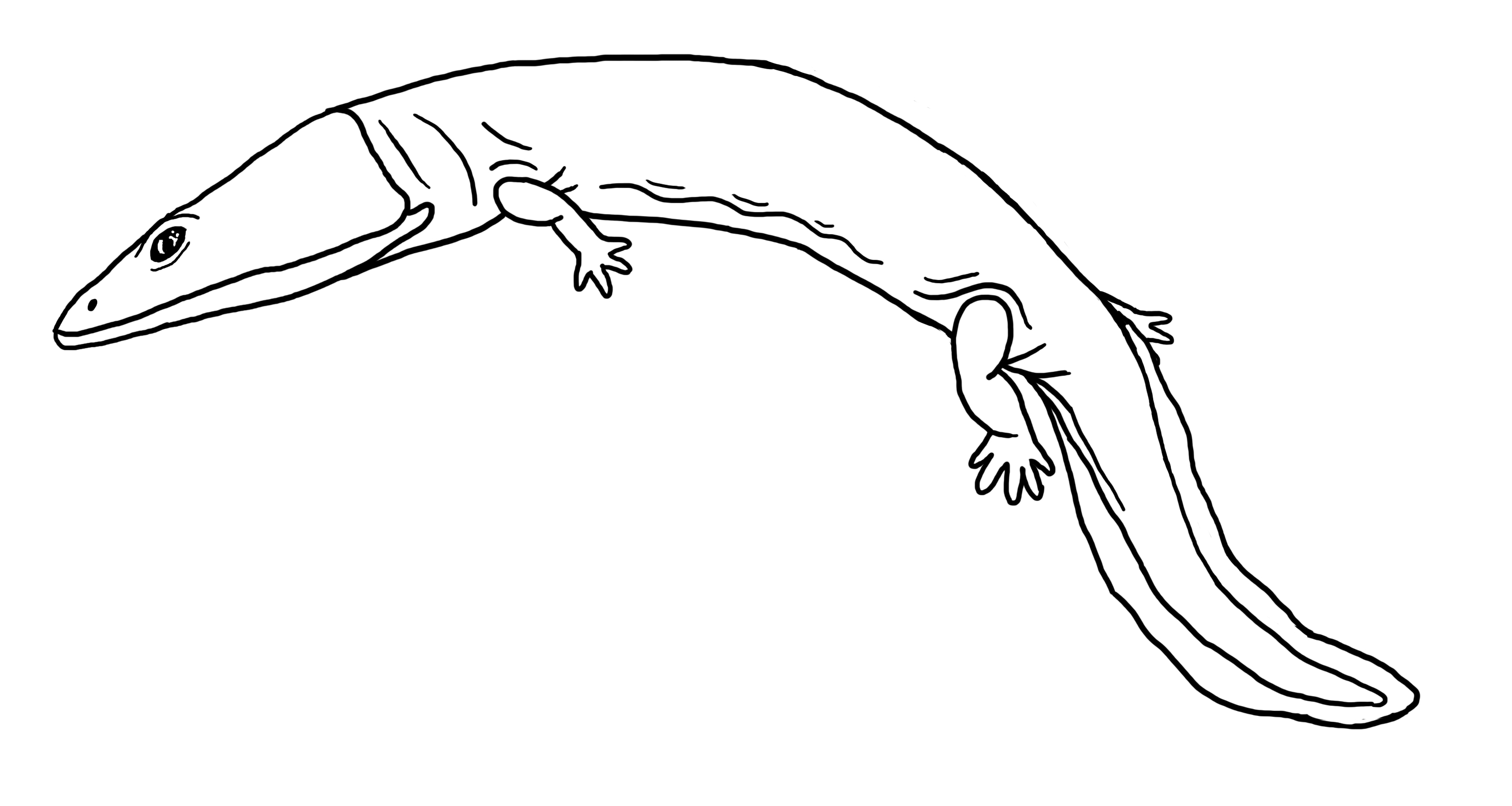
- Life restoration of the Permian amphibian Isodectes
  †Isodectes
  - †Isodectes obtusus
- †Isorophus – tentative report
- †Isorthis
- †Isotelus
  - †Isotelus gigas
  - †Isotelus maximus

== J ==
- †Jimpohlia – type locality for genus
  - †Jimpohlia erinacea – type locality for species
- †Juresania
  - †Juresania symmetrica

== K ==
- †Kanabinocrinus – tentative report
- †Kankakeea – type locality for genus
  - †Kankakeea grundyi – type locality for species
- †Kaskia
  - †Kaskia chesterensis
- †Kewaneesporites
  - †Kewaneesporites reticulatus
  - †Kewaneesporites reticuloides
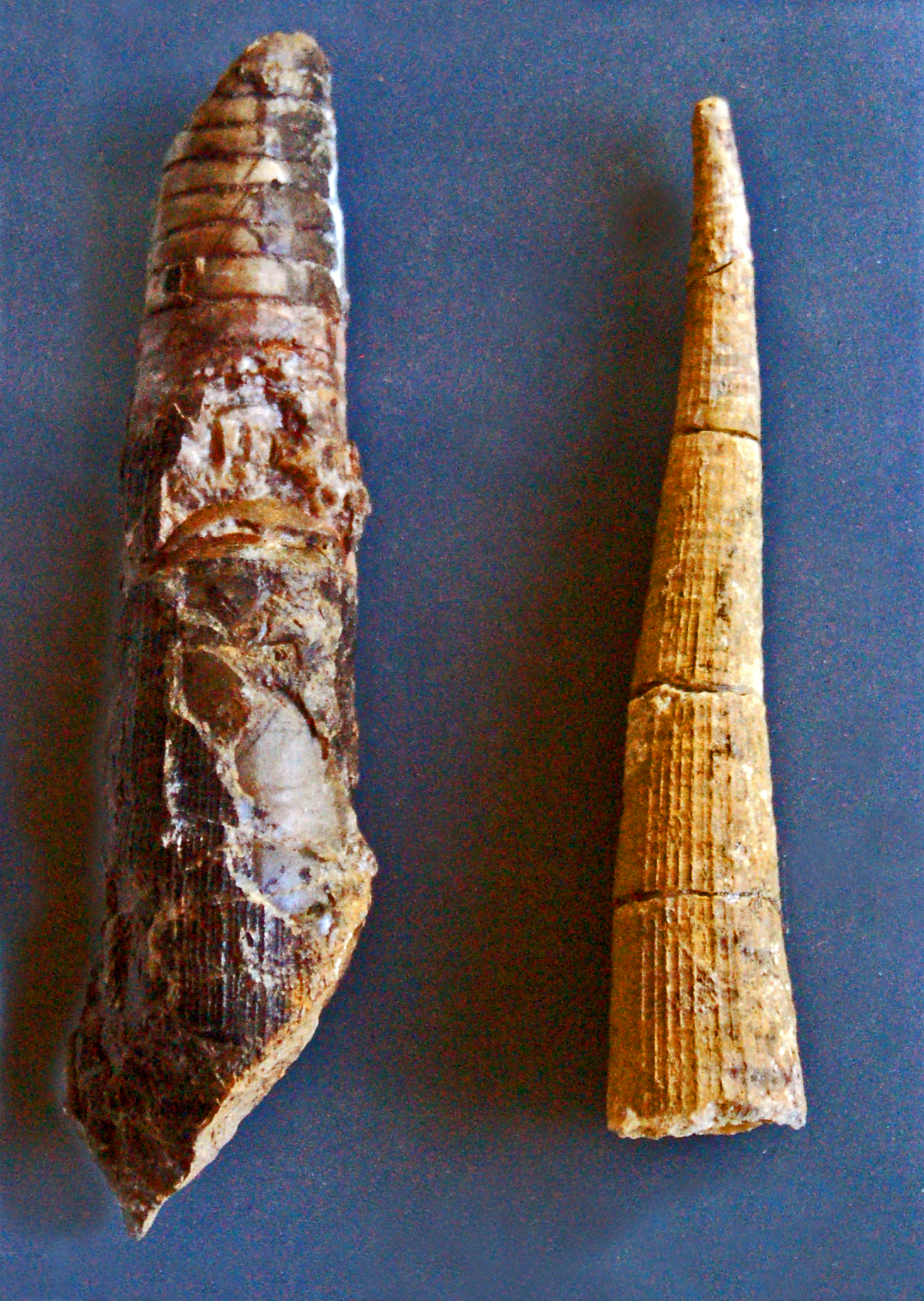
- Fossilized shells of the Middle Ordovician-Permian nautiloid cephalopod Kionoceras
  †Kionoceras
- †Kitakamithyris
  - †Kitakamithyris cooperensis
- †Kloedenella – tentative report
- †Knorria
  - †Knorria imbricata – or unidentified comparable form
- †Knoxisporites
  - †Knoxisporites rotatus
  - †Knoxisporites stephanephorus
  - †Knoxisporites triradiatus
- †Kosankeisporites
  - †Kosankeisporites elegans
- †Kosovopeltis
- †Kozlowskia
  - †Kozlowskia splendens
- †Kozlowskiella
  - †Kozlowskiella inexpectata – type locality for species
- †Kronoscorpio
  - †Kronoscorpio danielsi – type locality for species
- †Kustarachne – type locality for genus
  - †Kustarachne tenuipes – type locality for species
- †Kutorginella
  - †Kutorginella lasallensis

== L ==
- †Lacoea
  - †Lacoea seriata
- †Laevigatosporites
  - †Laevigatosporites desmoinensis
  - †Laevigatosporites desmoinesensis
  - †Laevigatosporites globosus
  - †Laevigatosporites medius
  - †Laevigatosporites minutus
  - †Laevigatosporites ovalis
  - †Laevigatosporites punctatus
  - †Laevigatosporites vulgaris
- †Lagenospermum
- †Lameereites – type locality for genus
  - †Lameereites curvipennis – type locality for species
- †Lampterocrinus
  - †Lampterocrinus inflatus
- †Larryia – type locality for genus
  - †Larryia osterbergi – type locality for species
- †Latosporites
  - †Latosporites minutus
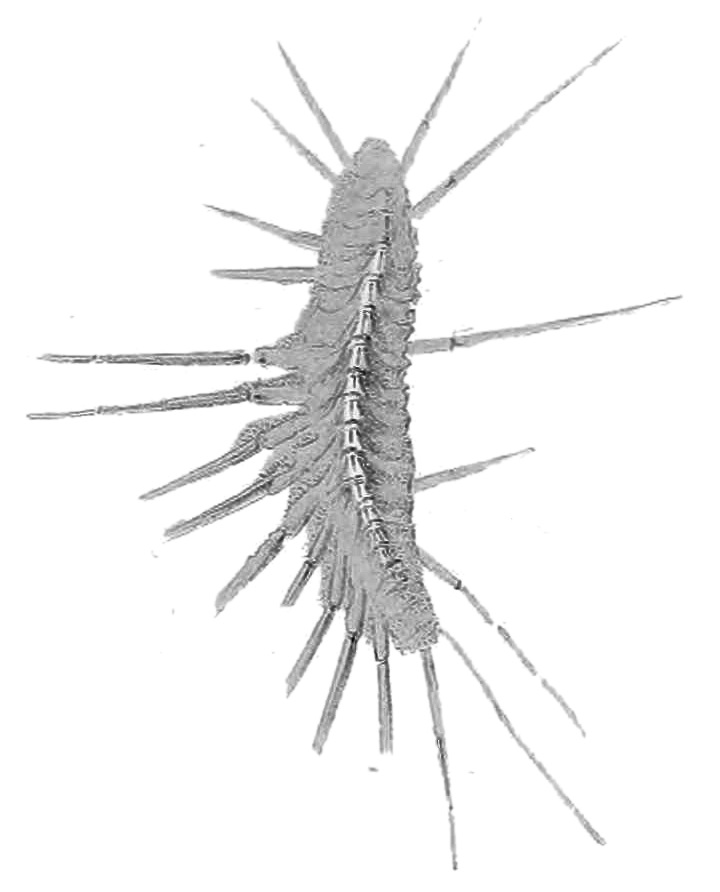
- Illustration of a fossil of the Carboniferous centipede Latzelia
  †Latzelia – type locality for genus
  - †Latzelia primordialis – type locality for species
- †Laudonocrinus
  - †Laudonocrinus subsinuatus
- †Leangella
- †Lecanocrinus
- †Lecthaylus - type locality for genus
  - †Lecthaylus gregarius - type locality for species
- †Leiotriletes
  - †Leiotriletes adnatoides
  - †Leiotriletes atshanensis – or unidentified comparable form
  - †Leiotriletes gracilis
  - †Leiotriletes levis
  - †Leiotriletes notatus
  - †Leiotriletes parvus
  - †Leiotriletes pseudolevis
- †Lepadocystis
- †Lepetopsis
  - †Lepetopsis chesterensis
- †Lepidocarpon
- †Lepidocyclus
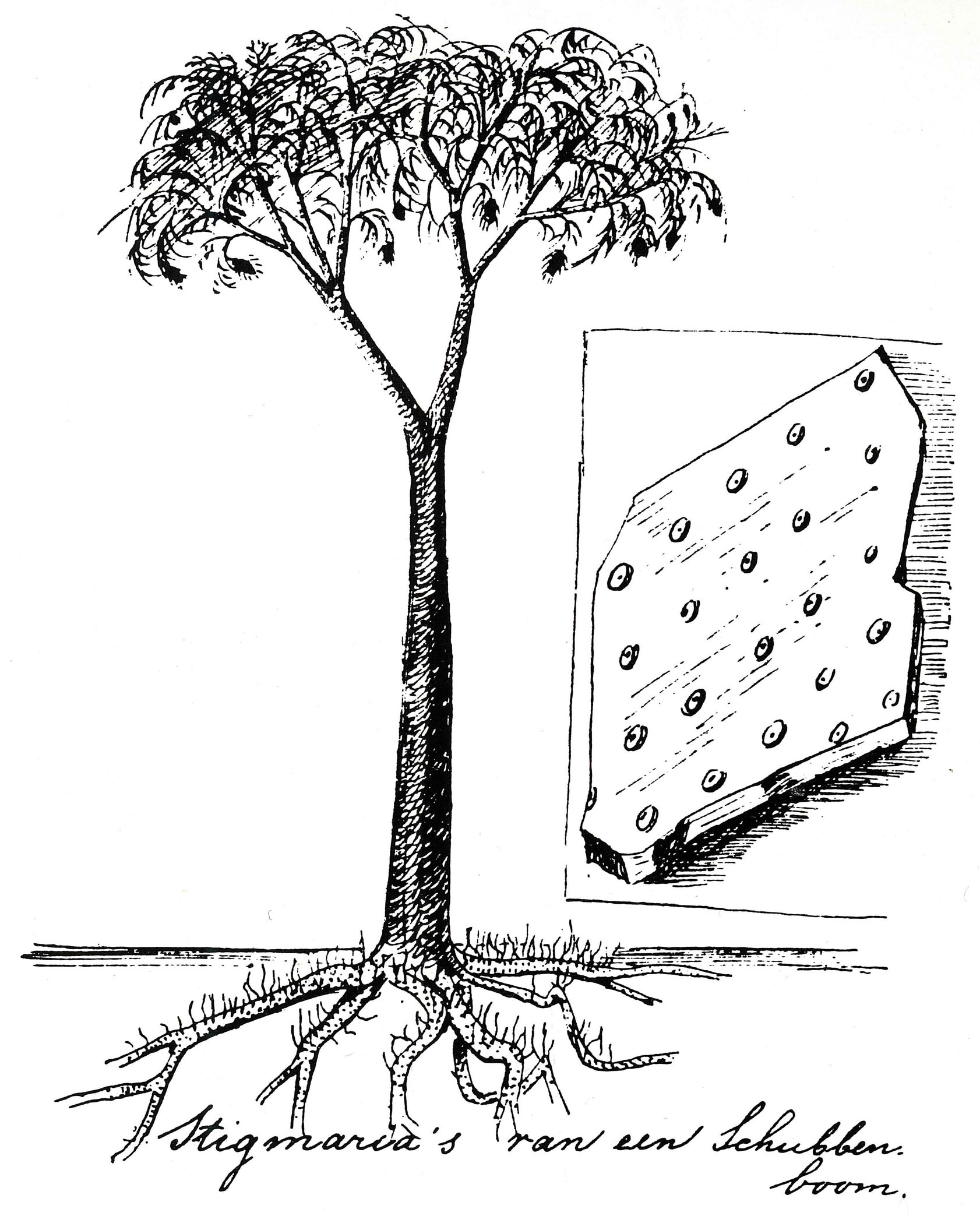
- Restoration of the Carboniferous-Late Triassic club moss relative Lepidodendron. Eli Heimans (1911).
  †Lepidodendron
  - †Lepidodendron aculeatum
  - †Lepidodendron oblongifolium
  - †Lepidodendron veltheimii – or unidentified comparable form
  - †Lepidodendron volkmannianum
  - †Lepidodendron wortheni
- †Lepidophloios
- †Lepidophylloides
- †Lepidophyllum
  - †Lepidophyllum campbelleanum
- †Lepidostrobophyllum
- †Lepidostrobus
- †Leptaena
  - †Leptaena aequalis
  - †Leptaena rhomboidalis
- †Leptagonia
  - †Leptagonia missouriensis – or unidentified comparable form
- †Leptodesma
  - †Leptodesma ehlersi – or unidentified comparable form
  - †Leptodesma laevis
- †Leptoptygma
  - †Leptoptygma fountainensis – type locality for species
  - †Leptoptygma golconda
- †Lesleya
  - †Lesleya cheimarosa – type locality for species
- †Lichas
  - †Lichas pugnax
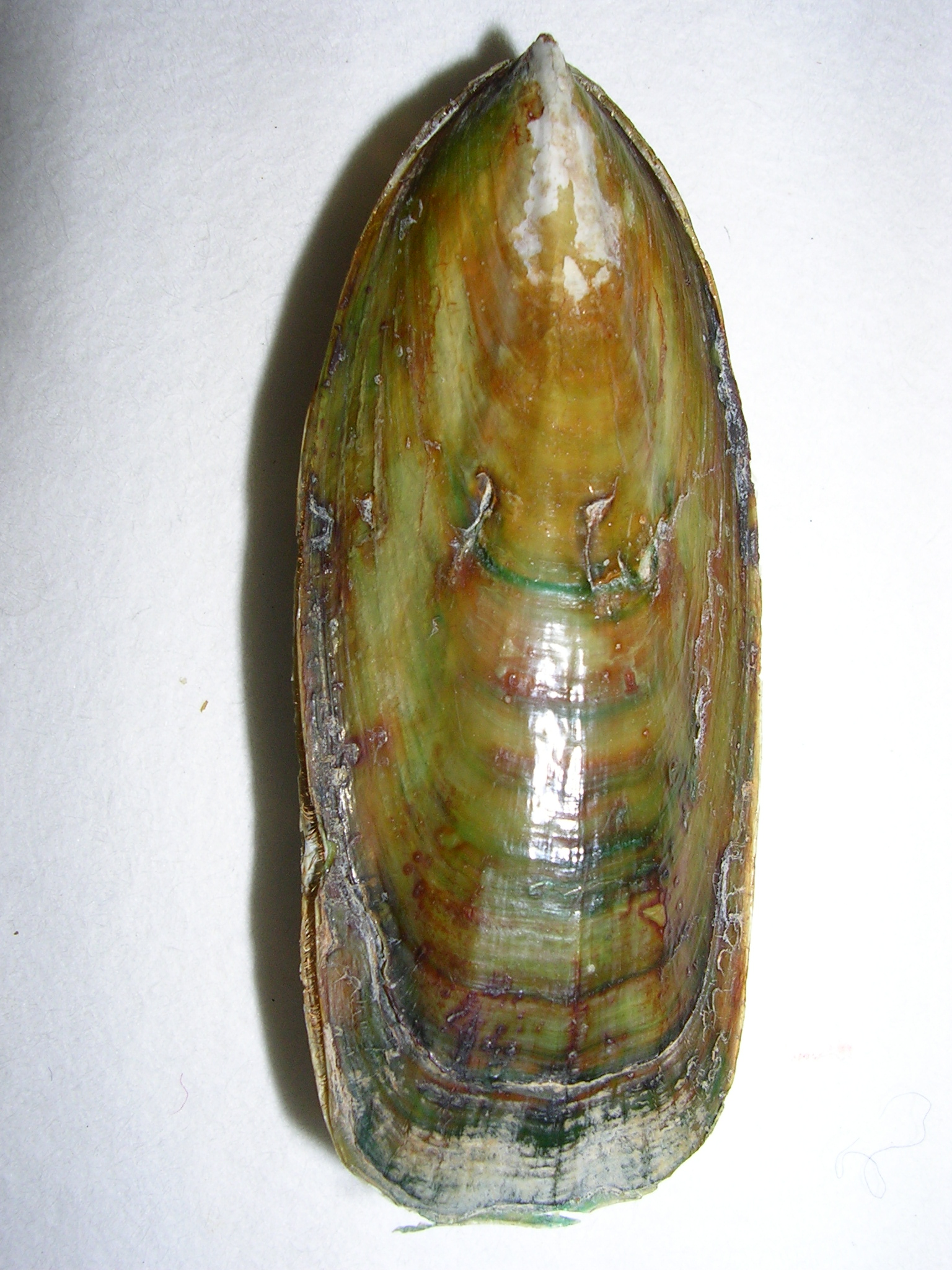
- Shell of the Cambrian-modern brachiopod Lingula
  †Lingula
  - †Lingula carbonaria
  - †Lingula lamellata
- †Linoproductus
  - †Linoproductus prattenianus
- †Linopteris
  - †Linopteris rubella
- †Liospira – tentative report
- †Liroceras
  - †Liroceras liratum
- †Lissatrypa – tentative report
- †Lissochonetes
  - †Lissochonetes geinitzianus
- †Lissomartus
  - †Lissomartus schucherti – type locality for species
- †Listroncanthus
- †Lithoneura – type locality for genus
  - †Lithoneura clayesi – type locality for species
  - †Lithoneura lameerei – type locality for species
  - †Lithoneura mirifica – type locality for species
  - †Lithoneura piecko – type locality for species
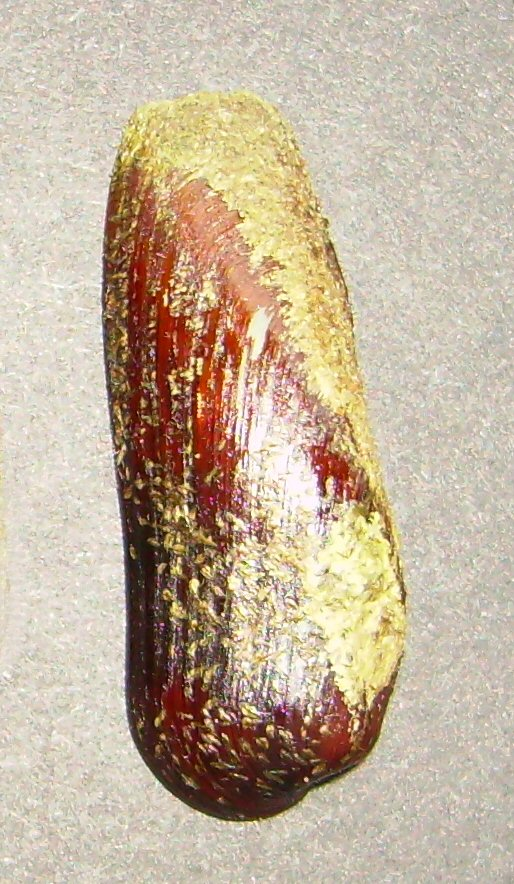
- Shell of a Lithophaga, or date mussel
  Lithophaga – tentative report
  - †Lithophaga subelliptica
- †Litostrobus – or unidentified comparable form
  - †Litostrobus iowensis
- †Lobeatta – type locality for genus
  - †Lobeatta schneideri – type locality for species
- †Lophophyllidium
  - †Lophophyllidium proliferum
- †Lophospira
  - †Lophospira obliqua
  - †Lophospira perangulata
  - †Lophospira serrulata
- †Lophotriletes
  - †Lophotriletes comissuralis
  - †Lophotriletes commissuralis
  - †Lophotriletes copiosus
  - †Lophotriletes gibbosus
  - †Lophotriletes granoornatus – or unidentified comparable form
  - †Lophotriletes ibrahimi
  - †Lophotriletes microsaetosus
  - †Lophotriletes mosaicus
  - †Lophotriletes pseudaculeatus
  - †Lophotriletes rarispinosus
- †Lycodemas – type locality for genus
  - †Lycodemas adolescens – type locality for species
- †Lycospora
  - †Lycospora brevijuga
  - †Lycospora granulata
  - †Lycospora micropapillata
  - †Lycospora noctuina
  - †Lycospora orbicula
  - †Lycospora paulula
  - †Lycospora pellucida
  - †Lycospora punctata
  - †Lycospora pusilla
  - †Lycospora rotunda
  - †Lycospora subjuga
  - †Lycospora torquifer
- †Lyellia
  - †Lyellia thebesensis
- †Lygdozoon
  - †Lygdozoon arkansana
- †Lyriocrinus
  - †Lyriocrinus melissa
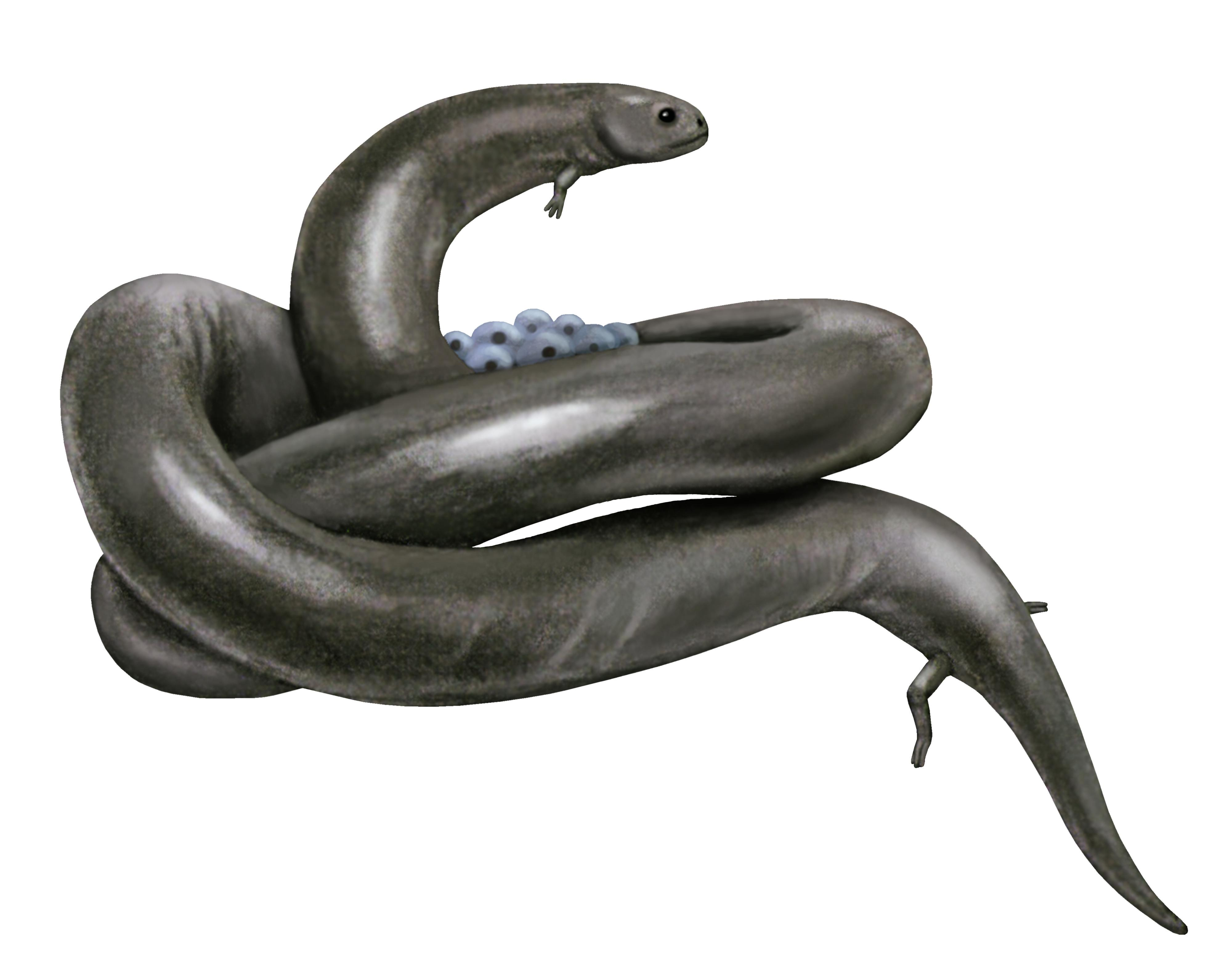
- Life restoration of the Permian snake-like amphibian Lysorophus showing speculative egg-coiling behavior
  †Lysorophus – type locality for genus
  - †Lysorophus tricarinatus – type locality for species

== M ==
- †Macrocrinus
  - †Macrocrinus mundulus
- †Macrostylocrinus
  - †Macrostylocrinus striatus
  - †Macrostylocrinus subglobosus
- †Maculatasporites
  - †Maculatasporites punctatus
- †Mammia – type locality for genus
  - †Mammia alutacea – type locality for species
- †Mariopteris
  - †Mariopteris occidentalis
  - †Mariopteris pygmaea
  - †Mariopteris sillimanni
  - †Mariopteris speciosa
- †Marsupiocrinus
  - †Marsupiocrinus chicagoensis
- †Mazoglossus
  - †Mazoglossus ramsdelli – type locality for species
- †Mazonia – type locality for genus
  - †Mazonia woodiana – type locality for species
- †Mazonopterum – type locality for genus
  - †Mazonopterum wolfforum – type locality for species
- †Mazostachys
  - †Mazostachys pendulata
- †Mazothairos – type locality for genus
  - †Mazothairos enormis – type locality for species
- †Mcluckiepteron – type locality for genus
  - †Mcluckiepteron luciae – type locality for species
- †Meekopora
  - †Meekopora eximia
- †Meekospira
  - †Meekospira bambooformis
  - †Meekospira batteni
  - †Meekospira evansvillensis
  - †Meekospira minuta – type locality for species
- †Megalometer – type locality for genus
  - †Megalometer lata – type locality for species
- †Megastrophia
  - †Megastrophia profunda
- †Megathentomum – type locality for genus
  - †Megathentomum pustulatum – type locality for species
  - †Megathentomum scudderi – type locality for species
- †Megistocrinus
- †Melinophlebia – type locality for genus
  - †Melinophlebia analis – type locality for species
- †Melocrinites
  - †Melocrinites obpyramidalis
- †Merista
- †Meristina
- †Mesoblastus – tentative report
- †Mesolobus
- †Mesoplica
  - †Mesoplica mesicostalis – tentative report
- †Metacheliphlebia
  - †Metacheliphlebia elongata – type locality for species
- †Metachorus
  - †Metachorus testudo – type locality for species
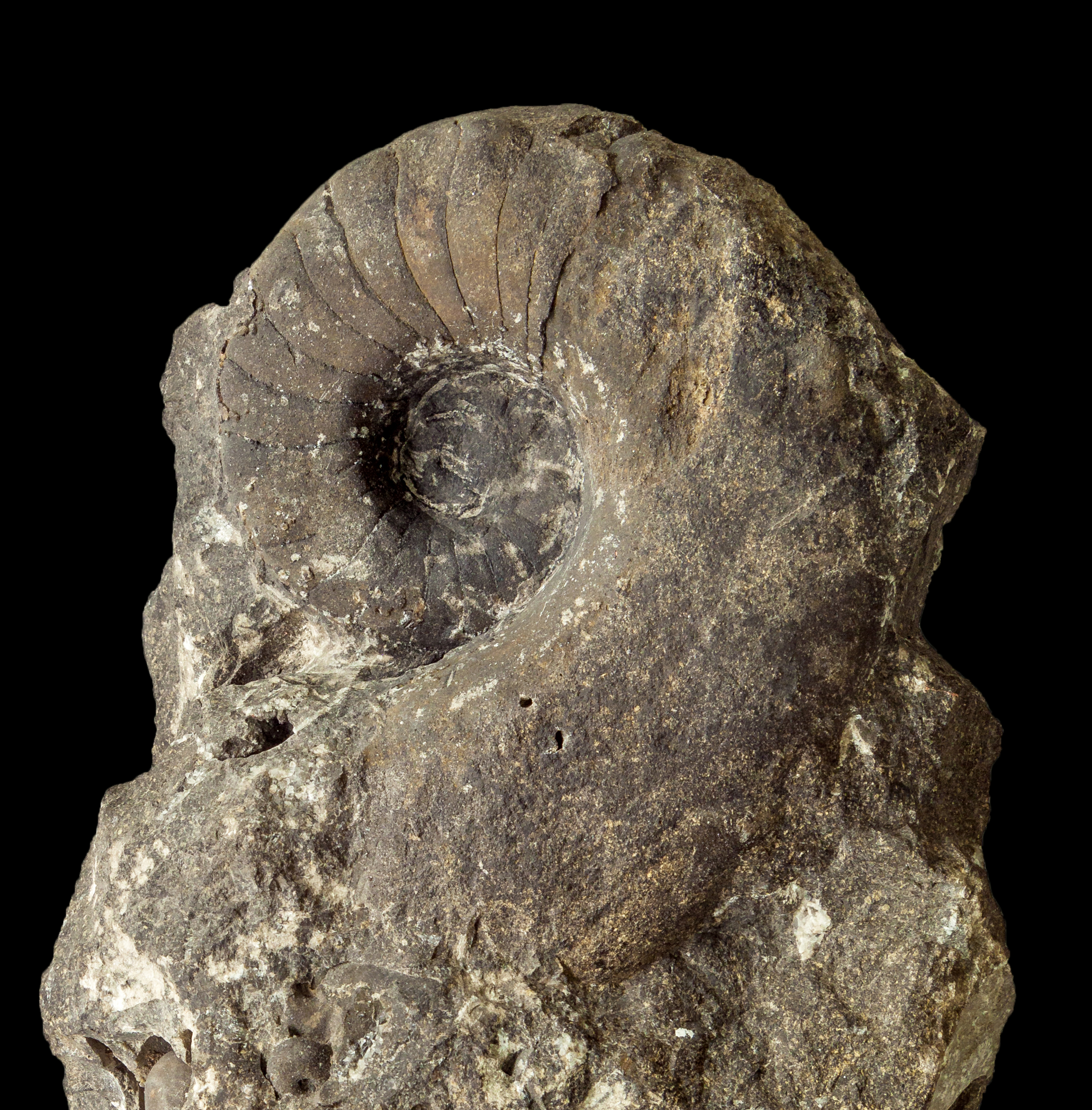
- Fossilized shell of the Carboniferous-Permian nautiloid cephalopod Metacoceras
  †Metacoceras
  - †Metacoceras copei – type locality for species
- †Metaconularia
  - †Metaconularia manni
- †Metatarbus – type locality for genus
  - †Metatarbus triangularis – type locality for species
- †Metopolichas
  - †Metopolichas breviceps
- †Miamia – type locality for genus
  - †Miamia bronsoni – type locality for species
- †Microcaracrinus
  - †Microcaracrinus conjugulus – type locality for species
- †Microreticulatisporites
  - †Microreticulatisporites concavus
  - †Microreticulatisporites harrisonii
  - †Microreticulatisporites lunatus
  - †Microreticulatisporites nobilis
  - †Microreticulatisporites sulcatus
- †Milosaurus – type locality for genus
  - †Milosaurus mccordi – type locality for species
- †Miobatrachus – type locality for genus
  - †Miobatrachus romeri – type locality for species
- †Mischoptera
  - †Mischoptera douglassi – type locality for species
- †Modiolopsis
- †Modiomorpha
  - †Modiomorpha concentrica
- †Modiomorphella
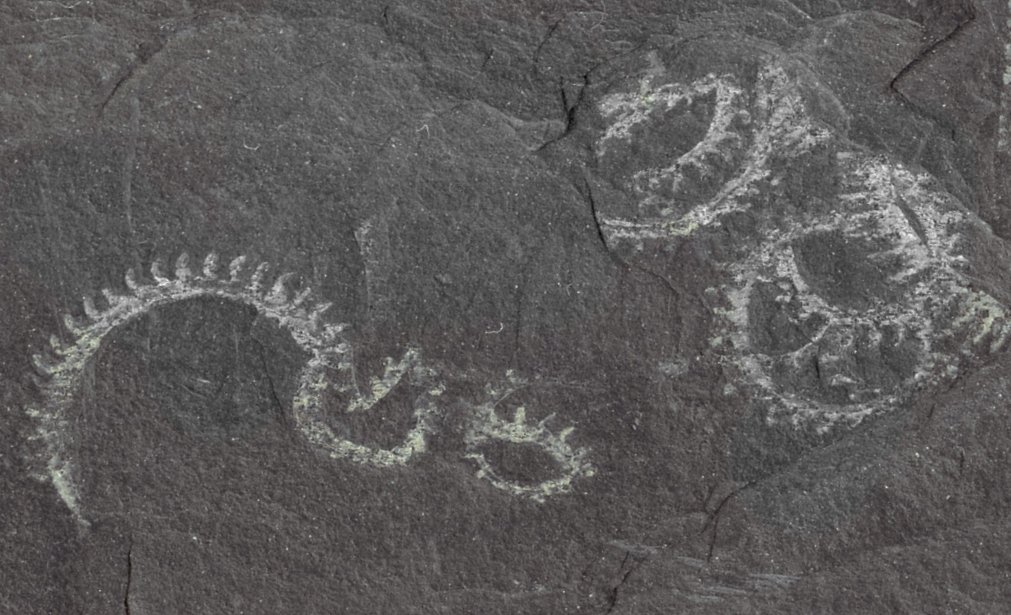
- Fossils of the Early Devonian graptolite Monograptus
  †Monograptus
  - †Monograptus dubius
  - †Monograptus vomerinus
- †Monomuchites
  - †Monomuchites annularis
- †Monopteria
  - †Monopteria longa
- †Mooreisporites
  - †Mooreisporites inusitatus
- †Mooreoceras
- †Moundocrinus
  - †Moundocrinus osagensis – or unidentified comparable form
- †Mourlonia
- †Mulceodens
  - †Mulceodens sibleyense – or unidentified related form
- †Murchisonia
  - †Murchisonia akidota
  - †Murchisonia anderdoniae
  - †Murchisonia sibleyensis
- †Murospora
  - †Murospora kosankei
- †Myelodactylus
- †Mylacris – type locality for genus
  - †Mylacris ampla – type locality for species
  - †Mylacris anthracophila – type locality for species
  - †Mylacris antiqua – type locality for species
  - †Mylacris diplodiscus – type locality for species
  - †Mylacris sellardsi
  - †Mylacris similis – type locality for species
- †Myriotheca
  - †Myriotheca arnoldi – type locality for species
  - †Myriotheca scaberrima
- †Mysticocrinus – report made of unidentified related form or using admittedly obsolete nomenclature
- †Myxinikela – type locality for genus
  - †Myxinikela siroka – type locality for species

== N ==
- †Nacekomia – type locality for genus
  - †Nacekomia rossae – type locality for species
- †Narkema – type locality for genus
  - †Narkema taeniatum – type locality for species
- †Naticonema
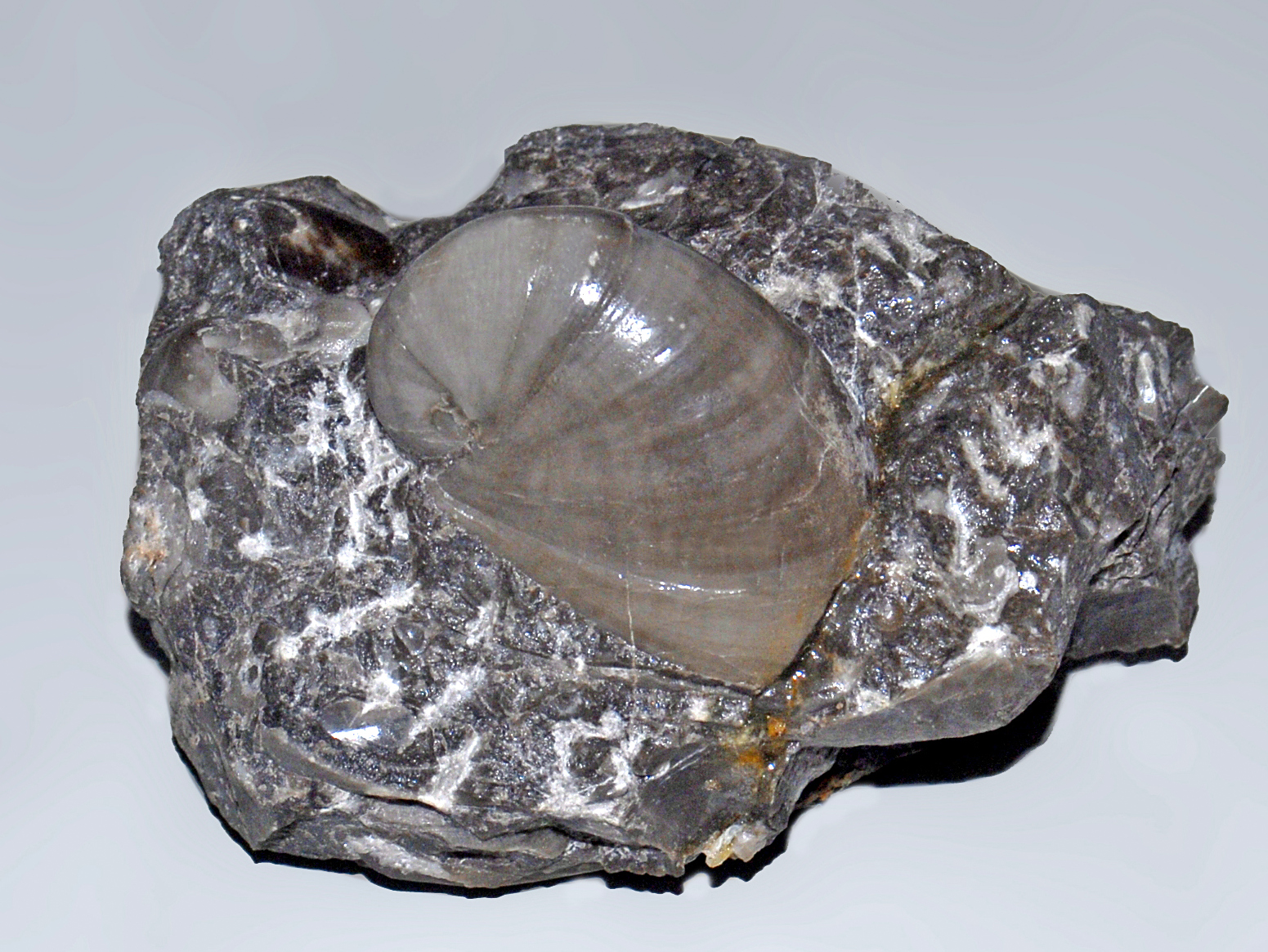
- Fossilized shell of the Early Devonian – Triassic sea snail Naticopsis
  †Naticopsis
  - †Naticopsis carleyana
  - †Naticopsis planifrons
  - †Naticopsis waterlooensis – type locality for species
- †Nectoptilus – type locality for genus
  - †Nectoptilus mazonus – type locality for species
- †Neilsonia
  - †Neilsonia welleri
- †Nemastomoides – type locality for genus
  - †Nemastomoides longipes – type locality for species
- †Nemavermes – type locality for genus
  - †Nemavermes mackeei – type locality for species
- †Neochonetes
  - †Neochonetes granulifer
- †Neofouquea – type locality for genus
  - †Neofouquea suzanneae – type locality for species
- †Neospirifer
  - †Neospirifer dunbari
  - †Neospirifer triplicatus
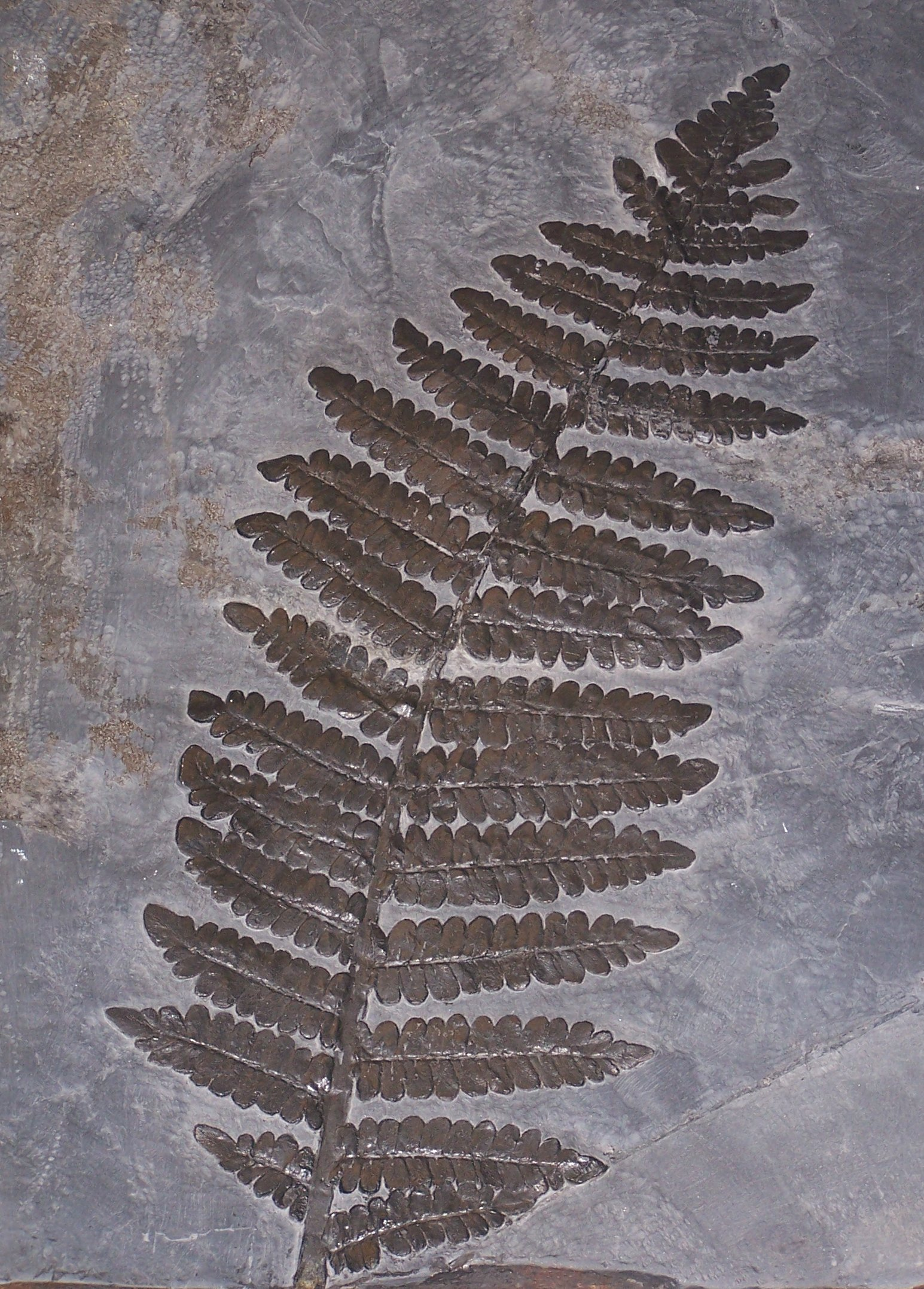
- Fossilized frond of the Carboniferous seed fern Neuropteris
  †Neuropteris
  - †Neuropteris clarksoni
  - †Neuropteris dussarti
  - †Neuropteris ovata
  - †Neuropteris parvifolia
  - †Neuropteris rarinervis
  - †Neuropteris scheuchzeri
  - †Neuropteris schlehani
  - †Neuropteris tennesseeana
  - †Neuropteris tenuifolia
- †Nigeroplica
  - †Nigeroplica illinoisensis – tentative report
- †Nodonema
  - †Nodonema granulatum
- †Nucleospira
  - †Nucleospira minima
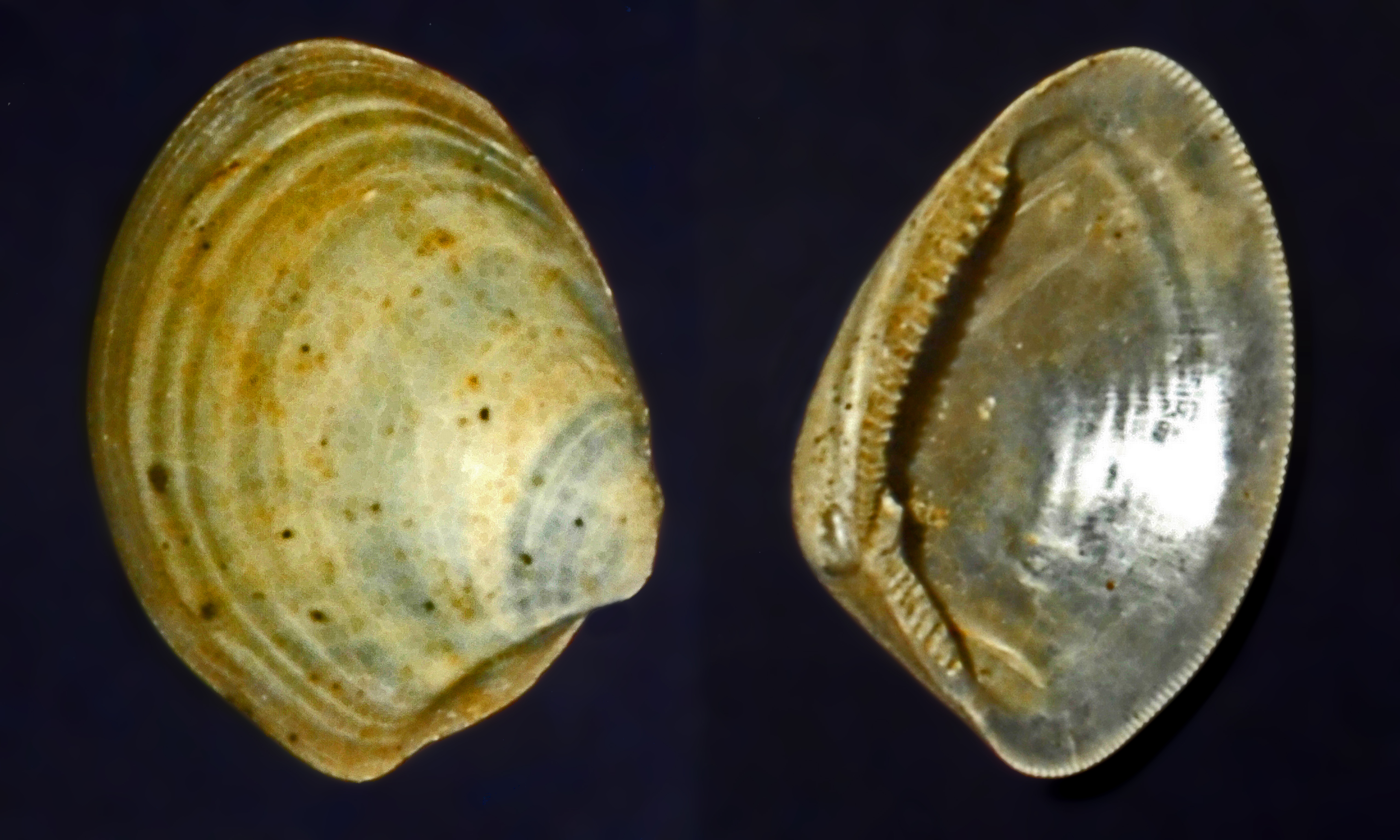
- Interior of a fossilized shell of the Early Ordovician-modern marine bivalve Nucula
  Nucula
- †Nuculoidea – tentative report
- †Nuculopsis
  - †Nuculopsis girtyi
- †Nummicrinus
  - †Nummicrinus waukoma

== O ==
- †Odontopteris
- †Oligocarpia
- †Oligotypus
  - †Oligotypus makowskii – type locality for species
- †Onychopterella – tentative report
  - †Onychopterella pumilis
- †Ootarbus – type locality for genus
  - †Ootarbus ovatus – type locality for species
  - †Ootarbus pulcher – type locality for species
- †Opiliotarbus
  - †Opiliotarbus elongatus – type locality for species
- †Orbiculoidea
  - †Orbiculoidea missouriensis
- †Orbinaria
  - †Orbinaria brownensis – tentative report
- †Orthomylacris
  - †Orthomylacris contorta – type locality for species
  - †Orthomylacris gurleyi – type locality for species
  - †Orthomylacris mansfieldi
  - †Orthomylacris rigida – type locality for species
- †Orthonychia
  - †Orthonychia chesterense
- †Orthospirifer
  - †Orthospirifer iowensis
- †Orthotarbus
  - †Orthotarbus minutus – type locality for species
  - †Orthotarbus robustus – type locality for species
- †Otarion
- †Ovatia
  - †Ovatia nascens
- †Ovopteris
  - †Ovopteris communis
- †Oxynoblatta
  - †Oxynoblatta triangularis – type locality for species
- †Oxyprora
  - †Oxyprora mesialis – type locality for species
  - †Oxyprora prattenanum – type locality for species

== P ==
- †Pachystrophia – tentative report
- †Palaeobuthus – type locality for genus
  - †Palaeobuthus distinctus – type locality for species
- †Palaeocarria – type locality for genus
  - †Palaeocarria ornata – type locality for species
- †Palaeodictyopteron – report made of unidentified related form or using admittedly obsolete nomenclature
  - †Palaeodictyopteron latipenne – type locality for species
  - †Palaeodictyopteron mazonum – type locality for species
- †Palaeolima
  - †Palaeolima equistriata
  - †Palaeolima retifer
  - †Palaeolima retifera
- †Palaeoneilo
  - †Palaeoneilo taffiana
- †Palaeopisthacanthus – type locality for genus
  - †Palaeopisthacanthus schucherti – type locality for species
- †Palaeopteridium
  - †Palaeopteridium reussii
- †Palaeostachys
  - †Palaeostachys andrewsii
- †Palaeostylus
- †Palaeozygopleura
  - †Palaeozygopleura venusta
  - †Palaeozygopleura welleri
  - †Palaeozygopleura wortheni – type locality for species
- †Palaiotaptus – type locality for genus
  - †Palaiotaptus mazonus – type locality for species
- †Palenarthrus – type locality for genus
  - †Palenarthrus impressus – type locality for species
- †Paleospora
  - †Paleospora fragila
- †Palmatopteris
- †Parachaetetes
- †Paraconularia
- †Paraisobuthus
  - †Paraisobuthus virginiae – type locality for species
- †Parajuresania
  - †Parajuresania nebrascensis
- †Parallelodon
  - †Parallelodon obsoletus
  - †Parallelodon sangamonensis
- †Parallelora
  - †Parallelora nupera
- †Paralogopsis – type locality for genus
  - †Paralogopsis longipes – type locality for species
- †Paramphicrinus – type locality for genus
  - †Paramphicrinus oklahomaensis – type locality for species
- †Parapaolia
  - †Parapaolia superba – type locality for species
- †Paraparchites
  - †Paraparchites carbonaria
  - †Paraparchites nicklesi
- †Paraphorhynchus
  - †Paraphorhynchus striatocostatum
- †Paratarbus – type locality for genus
  - †Paratarbus carbonarius – type locality for species
- †Pareinoblatta
  - †Pareinoblatta sellardsi – type locality for species
- †Paromylacris
  - †Paromylacris ampla – type locality for species
  - †Paromylacris rotunda – type locality for species
- †Parulocrinus
  - †Parulocrinus pontiacensis – type locality for species
- †Patellilabia
  - †Patellilabia chesterensis
- †Paucicrura
- †Paucijaculum – type locality for genus
  - †Paucijaculum samamithion – type locality for species
- †Paupospira
  - †Paupospira thebesensis – type locality for species
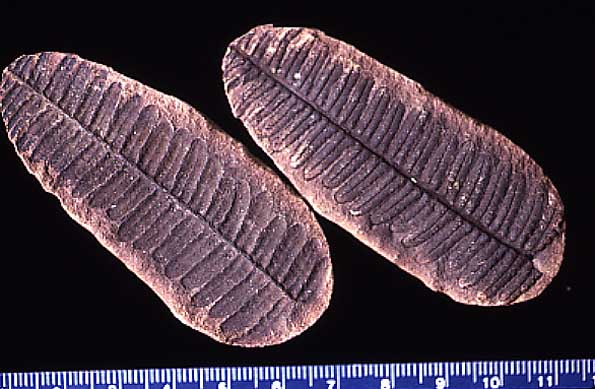
- Fossils of the Late Devonian-Permian fern-like fronds Pecopteris
  †Pecopteris
  - †Pecopteris plumosa
  - †Pecopteris serrulata
  - †Pecopteris vestita
- †Pendulostachys – type locality for genus
  - †Pendulostachys cingulariformis – type locality for species
- †Pentaramicrinus
  - †Pentaramicrinus bimagnaramus
- †Pentremites
  - †Pentremites clavatus
  - †Pentremites godoni
  - †Pentremites obesus
  - †Pentremites okawensis
  - †Pentremites pyriformis
  - †Pentremites springeri
  - †Pentremites tulipaformis
- †Pentremoblastus
- †Pericalyphe – type locality for genus
  - †Pericalyphe longa – type locality for species
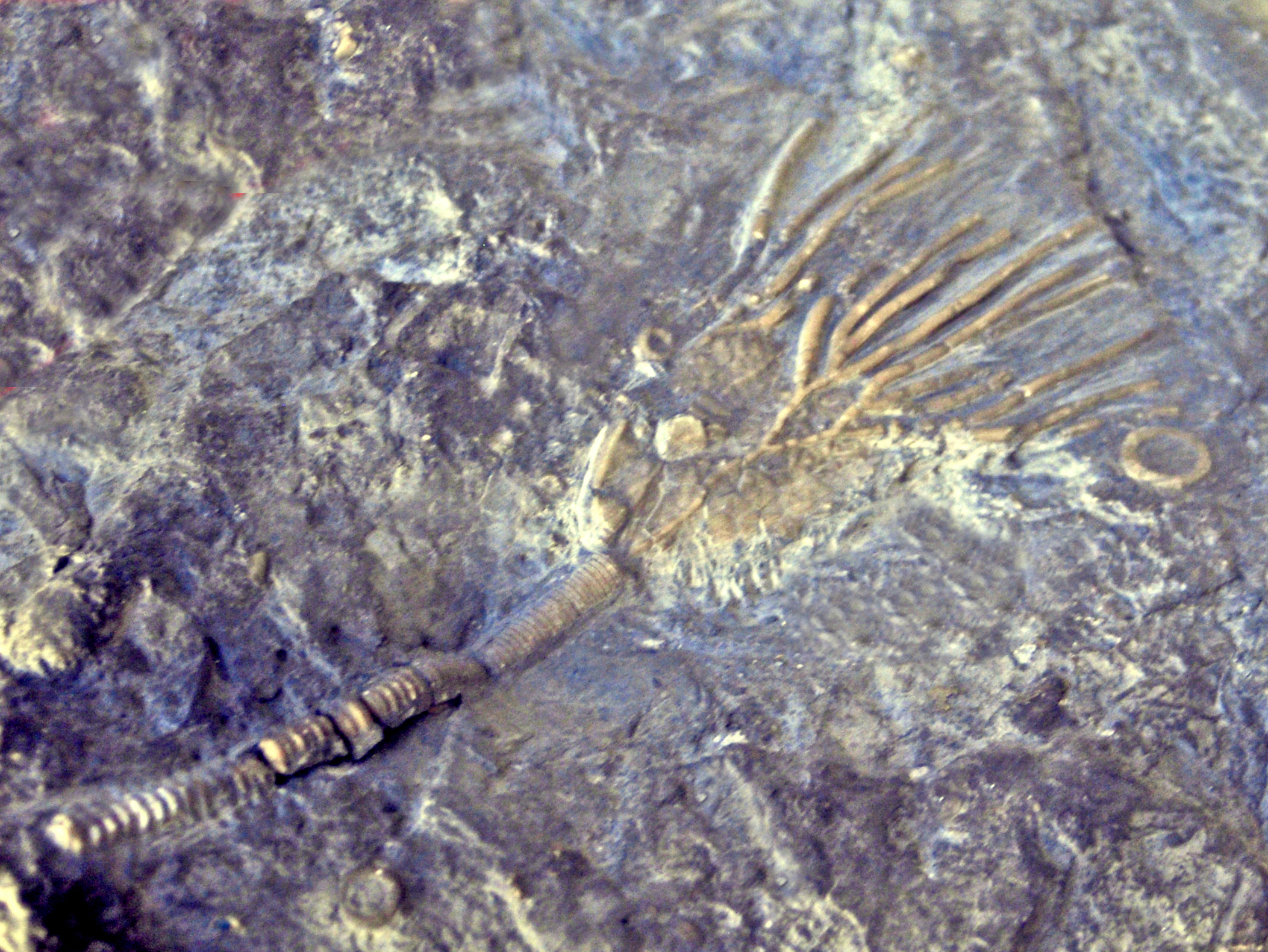
- Fossil of the Silurian-Carboniferous crinoid ("sea lily") Periechocrinus
  †Periechocrinus
  - †Periechocrinus chicagoensis
  - †Periechocrinus infelix
  - †Periechocrinus marcouanus
  - †Periechocrinus necis
  - †Periechocrinus urniformis
- †Pernopecten
  - †Pernopecten attenuatus – tentative report
  - †Pernopecten ohioensis
- †Perotriletes
  - †Perotriletes parvigracilus
- †Petrochus
  - †Petrochus conica
  - †Petrochus mellaria – or unidentified comparable form
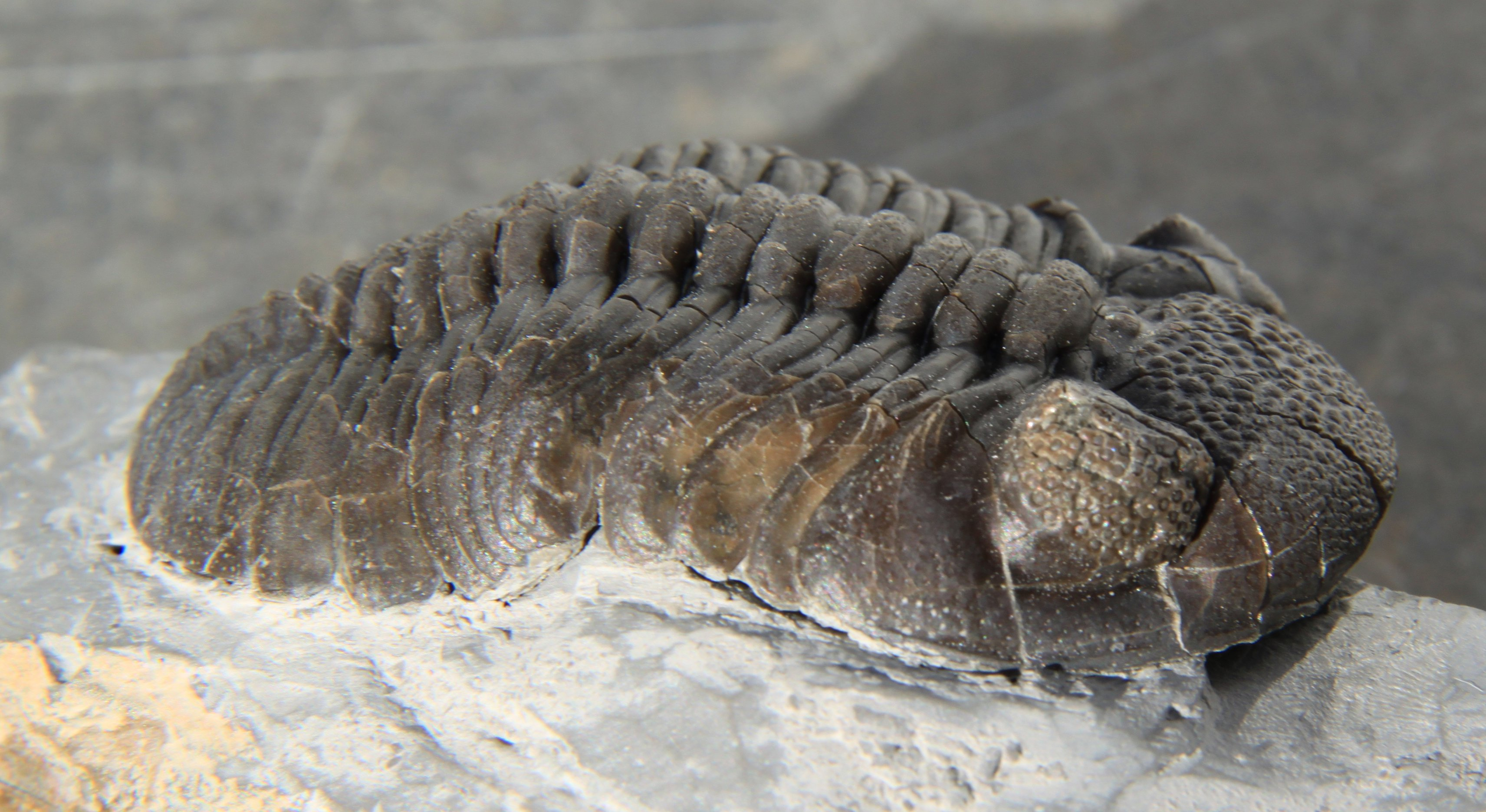
- Fossil of the Late Ordovician-Late Devonian trilobite Phacops
  †Phacops
  - †Phacops norwoodensis
- †Phanerotrema
- †Pharkidonotus
  - †Pharkidonotus harrodi – type locality for species
  - †Pharkidonotus percarinatus
- †Phascolophyllaphycus
  - †Phascolophyllaphycus lohrensis
- †Phestia
  - †Phestia bellistriatus
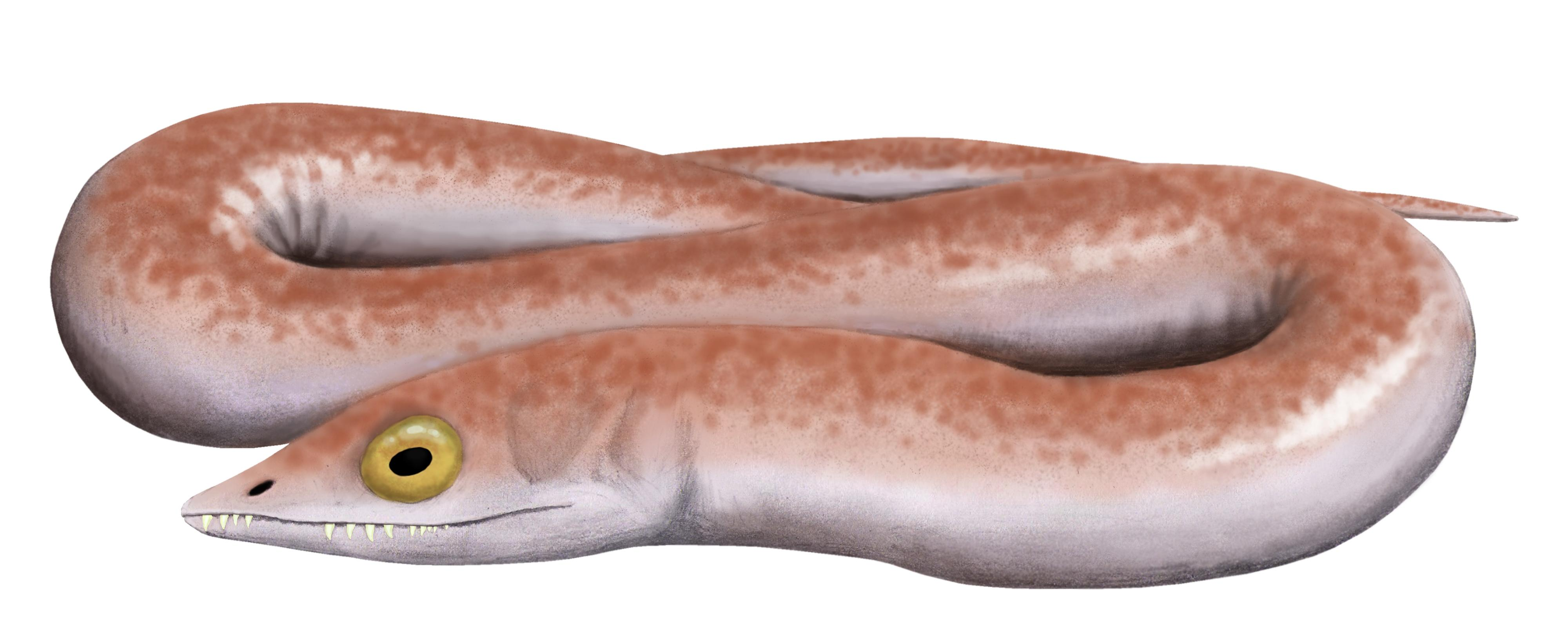
- Life restoration of the Carboniferous-Permian amphibian Phlegethontia.
  †Phlegethontia
  - †Phlegethontia longissima – type locality for species
- †Phlyctiscapha
- †Phragmoceras
- †Phragmolites
  - †Phragmolites multinotatus – type locality for species
- †Phyloblatta
  - †Phyloblatta diversipennis – type locality for species
  - †Phyloblatta hilliana – type locality for species
- †Phymatopleura
- †Pilosisporites
  - †Pilosisporites williamsii
- †Pisocrinus
- †Pityosporites
- †Planisporites
  - †Planisporites granifer
- †Platyceras
  - †Platyceras lineata
  - †Platyceras subrotundum
- †Platycrinus
- †Platylichas
- †Platymylacris
  - †Platymylacris paucinervis – type locality for species
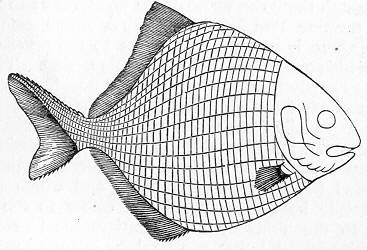
- Life restoration of the Carboniferous-Permian bony fish Platysomus
  †Platysomus
  - †Platysomus circularis
- †Platystrophia
  - †Platystrophia biforata
- †Platyzona
- †Plectatrypa
- †Pleophrynus – type locality for genus
  - †Pleophrynus ensifer – type locality for species
- †Pleurojulus
  - †Pleurojulus biornatus – or unidentified comparable form
- †Plicochonetes
  - †Plicochonetes glenparkensis – tentative report
- †Plummericrinus
  - †Plummericrinus erectus
- †Pohlispongia – type locality for genus
  - †Pohlispongia monosphaera – type locality for species
- †Pojetaconcha
  - †Pojetaconcha limatula
- †Poliochera – type locality for genus
  - †Poliochera gibbsi – type locality for species
  - †Poliochera glabra – type locality for species
  - †Poliochera punctulata – type locality for species
- †Polusocrinus
  - †Polusocrinus avanti
- †Polyernus – type locality for genus
  - †Polyernus complanatus – type locality for species
- †Polyetes – type locality for genus
  - †Polyetes furcifer – type locality for species
- †Polygonocrinus
  - †Polygonocrinus spiniferus – type locality for species
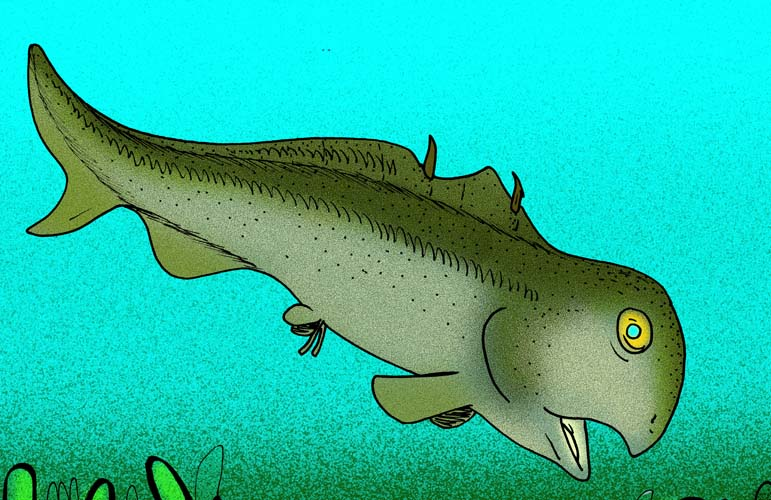
- Life restoration of the Carboniferous Chimaera relative Polysentor
  †Polysentor – type locality for genus
  - †Polysentor gorbairdi – type locality for species
- †Porcellia
  - †Porcellia chesterensis
- †Poteriocrinus – tentative report
- †Potonieisporites
  - †Potonieisporites elegans
- †Priapulites – type locality for genus
  - †Priapulites konecniorum – type locality for species
- †Probletocrinus – type locality for genus
  - †Probletocrinus curtus – type locality for species
- †Prochoroptera – type locality for genus
  - †Prochoroptera calopteryx – type locality for species
- †Procoronaspora
  - †Procoronaspora dumosa
- †Prodentalium
- †Productella
  - †Productella subalata
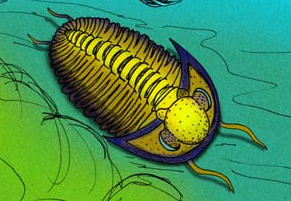
- Restoration of the Silurian trilobite Proetus
  †Proetus
  - †Proetus canalis
  - †Proetus determinatus
  - †Proetus handwerki
- †Progenentomum – type locality for genus
  - †Progenentomum carbonis – type locality for species
- †Promexyele
  - †Promexyele peyeri
- †Promylacris
  - †Promylacris ovalis – type locality for species
- †Promytilus – tentative report
  - †Promytilus annosus
- †Protatrypa
- †Protoblattoidea – report made of unidentified related form or using admittedly obsolete nomenclature
  - †Protoblattoidea minor
  - †Protoblattoidea sellardsi
- †Protodictyon – type locality for genus
  - †Protodictyon pulchripenne – type locality for species
- †Protoleptostrophia
- †Protomegastrophia
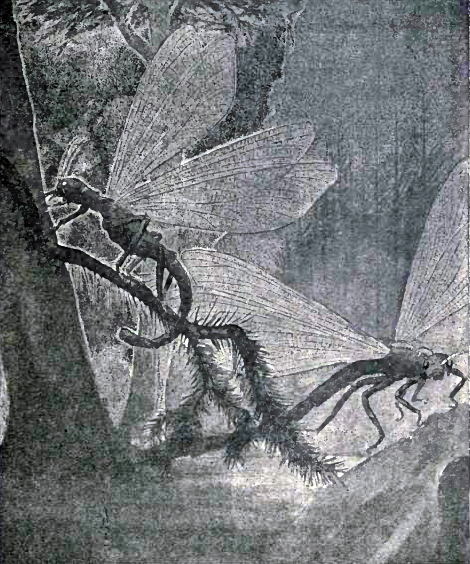
- Life restoration of the Carboniferous insects Protophasma and Titanophasma
  †Protophasma
  - †Protophasma galtieri – type locality for species
- †Protopilio
  - †Protopilio depressus – type locality for species
- †Protoscolex
  - †Protoscolex ruedemanni
- †Protosolpuga – type locality for genus
  - †Protosolpuga carbonaria – type locality for species
- †Pseudaviculopecten
  - †Pseudaviculopecten princeps
- †Pseudoatrypa
  - †Pseudoatrypa devoniana
- †Pseudogerarus – type locality for genus
  - †Pseudogerarus scudderi – type locality for species
- †Pseudomonotis
  - †Pseudomonotis equistriata
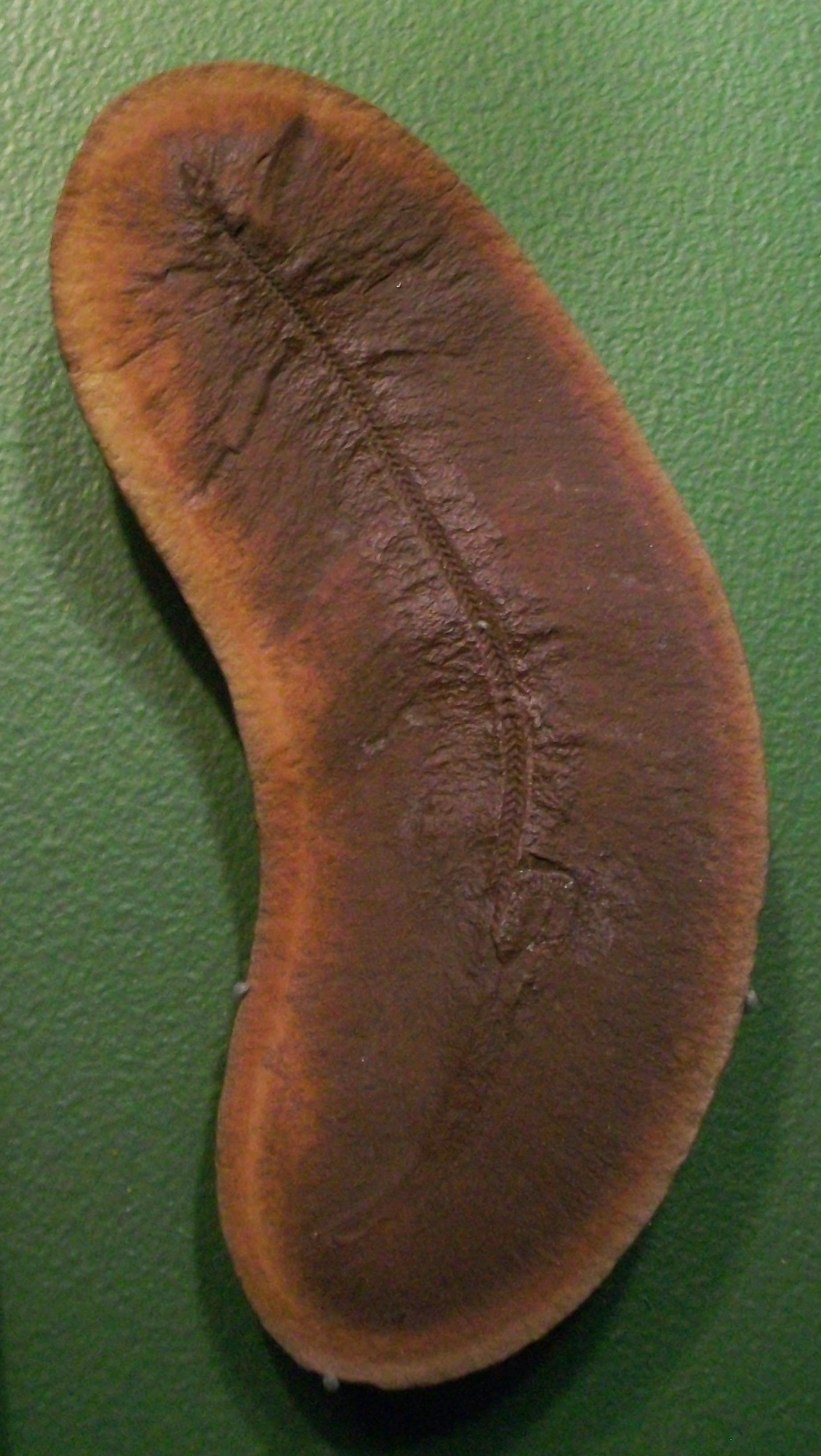
- Fossilized skeleton of the Carboniferous snake-like amphibian Pseudophlegethontia
  †Pseudophlegethontia – type locality for genus
  - †Pseudophlegethontia turnbullorum – type locality for species
- †Pseudorthoceras
  - †Pseudorthoceras knoxense
- †Pseudosphonophyton
  - †Pseudosphonophyton höegii – type locality for species
- †Pseudozygopleura
  - †Pseudozygopleura yandellana – or unidentified comparable form
- †Pterinea
  - †Pterinea thebesensis
- †Pterochiton
  - †Pterochiton carbonarius – type locality for species
- †Pteronites
- †Pterotheca
  - †Pterotheca triangularis – type locality for species
- †Pterotocrinus
  - †Pterotocrinus abruptus
  - †Pterotocrinus armatus
  - †Pterotocrinus capitalis
  - †Pterotocrinus coronarius
  - †Pterotocrinus lingulaformis
  - †Pterotocrinus rugosus
- †Ptychocarpus
- †Pulchratia – tentative report
  - †Pulchratia symmetrica
- †Punctatisporites
  - †Punctatisporites aerarius
  - †Punctatisporites curviradiatus
  - †Punctatisporites decorus
  - †Punctatisporites edgarensis
  - †Punctatisporites flavus
  - †Punctatisporites glaber
  - †Punctatisporites gracilirugosus – or unidentified comparable form
  - †Punctatisporites irrasus
  - †Punctatisporites kankakeensis
  - †Punctatisporites minutus
  - †Punctatisporites nahannensis
  - †Punctatisporites obesus
  - †Punctatisporites obliquus
  - †Punctatisporites orbicularis
  - †Punctatisporites pseudolevatus – or unidentified comparable form
  - †Punctatisporites vermiculatus
- †Punctatosporites
  - †Punctatosporites minutus
- †Punctospirifer
  - †Punctospirifer kentuckensis
  - †Punctospirifer transversus
- †Pustulatisporites
  - †Pustulatisporites crenatus
- †Pustulatisporties
  - †Pustulatisporties crenatus
- †Pycnosaccus
- †Pyrgocystis

== Q ==
- †Quadrochonetes
  - †Quadrochonetes geronticus
- †Quasillinites
  - †Quasillinites diversiformis

== R ==
- †Radiizonates
  - †Radiizonates striatus
- †Rafinesquina
  - †Rafinesquina mesicosta
- †Raistrickia
  - †Raistrickia abdita
  - †Raistrickia aculeata
  - †Raistrickia aculeolata
  - †Raistrickia breveminens
  - †Raistrickia brevemines
  - †Raistrickia carbondalensis
  - †Raistrickia crinita
  - †Raistrickia crocea
  - †Raistrickia dispar
  - †Raistrickia fibrata – or unidentified comparable form
  - †Raistrickia grovensis
  - †Raistrickia irregularis
  - †Raistrickia lacerata
  - †Raistrickia lowellensis
  - †Raistrickia pilosa
  - †Raistrickia pontiacensis
  - †Raistrickia prisca
  - †Raistrickia solaria
  - †Raistrickia subcrinita
  - †Raistrickia superba
- †Rasstriga – type locality for genus
  - †Rasstriga americana – type locality for species
- †Redstockia
- †Reinschospora
  - †Reinschospora magnifica
  - †Reinschospora triangularis
- †Remopleurides
  - †Remopleurides missouriensis
- †Renaultia
- †Renisporites
  - †Renisporites confossus
- †Resserella
- †Reticulariiina
  - †Reticulariiina spinosa
- †Reticulariina
  - †Reticulariina spinosa
- †Reticulatia
  - †Reticulatia huecoensis
- †Reticulatisporites
  - †Reticulatisporites lacunosus
  - †Reticulatisporites muricatus
  - †Reticulatisporites polygonalis
  - †Reticulatisporites reticulatus
  - †Reticulatisporites splendens
- †Reticulograptus
  - †Reticulograptus polymorphus
- †Retispira
  - †Retispira monronensis – type locality for species
  - †Retispira nodocostata – type locality for species
  - †Retispira ornatus – type locality for species
- †Rhabdoxylon
  - †Rhabdoxylon americanum – type locality for species
- †Rhineoderma
  - †Rhineoderma piasaensis – type locality for species
- †Rhipidium
- †Rhipidomella
  - †Rhipidomella carbonaria
  - †Rhipidomella rockportensis
- †Rhodea
  - †Rhodea trichomanoides – or unidentified comparable form
- †Rhodeopteridium
  - †Rhodeopteridium phillipsii – type locality for species
- †Rhombopora
- †Rhynchogonium
  - †Rhynchogonium fayettevillense
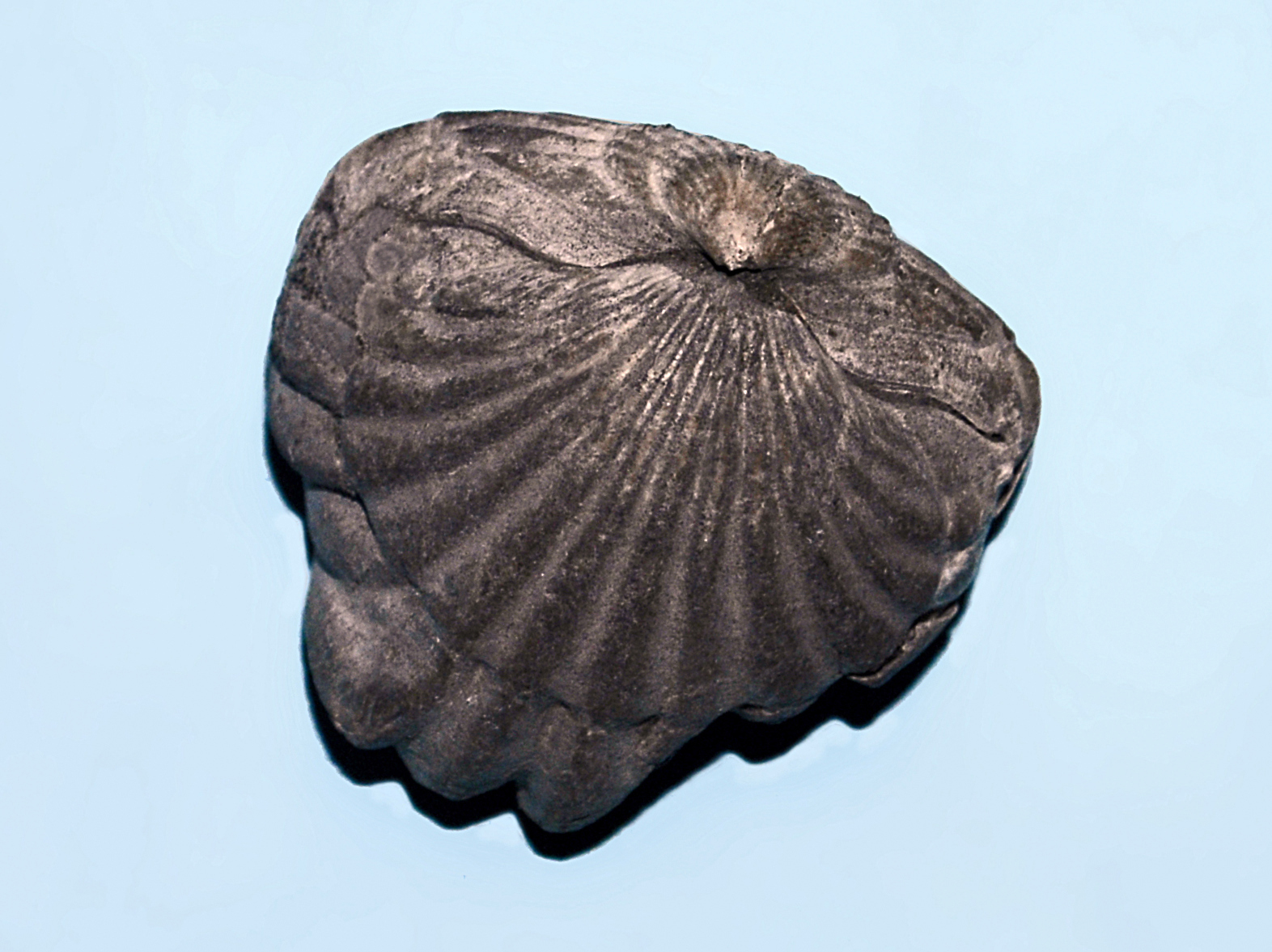
- Fossilized shell of the Silurian-Eocene articulate brachiopod Rhynchonella
  †Rhynchonella
- †Rhynchopora
  - †Rhynchopora hamburgensis
  - †Rhynchopora prisca
  - †Rhynchopora pustulosa
- †Rhynchotreta
- †Rugosochonetes
  - †Rugosochonetes gregarius – or unidentified comparable form
  - †Rugosochonetes pikensis
- †Ruthiphiala
  - †Ruthiphiala sublaevis

== S ==
- †Saccoglossus
  - †Saccoglossus testa – type locality for species
- †Saetograptus
  - †Saetograptus colonus
- †Sagenodus
  - †Sagenodus cristatus – type locality for species
- †Sagittoceras
  - †Sagittoceras hathawayanum – type locality for species
- †Salterospira
  - †Salterospira chesterensis
  - †Salterospira okawensis
- †Salvadorea
  - †Salvadorea randi
- †Samaropsis
- †Savagella
  - †Savagella illinoisensis
  - †Savagella lindahli
- †Savitrisporites
  - †Savitrisporites asperatus
  - †Savitrisporites majus
  - †Savitrisporites nux
- †Scepasma – type locality for genus
  - †Scepasma gigas – type locality for species
- †Sceptropora
  - †Sceptropora facula
- †Schizodus
- †Schizophoria
  - †Schizophoria hortonensis
  - †Schizophoria iowensis
- †Schizotreta
  - †Schizotreta tenuilamellata
- †Schondorfia – type locality for genus
  - †Schondorfia fungosa – type locality for species
- †Schopfites
  - †Schopfites carbondalensis
  - †Schopfites colchesterensis
  - †Schopfites dimorphus
- †Schuchertella
  - †Schuchertella hardinensis
  - †Schuchertella louisianaensis
  - †Schuchertella propinqua
- †Schuchertiella – type locality for genus
  - †Schuchertiella gracilis – type locality for species
- †Schulzospora
  - †Schulzospora rara
- †Sciadiocrinus
  - †Sciadiocrinus tegillum – type locality for species
- †Scolecopteris – tentative report
- †Sedenticellula
  - †Sedenticellula hamburgensis
- †Selenella
  - †Selenella pediculus
- †Semiproductus
- †Senftenbergia
- †Sentosia
  - †Sentosia ignota – tentative report
- †Septameroceras
- †Serpulopsis
- †Serpulospira
  - †Serpulospira diversiformis
- †Shansiella
  - †Shansiella broadheadi – tentative report
- †Shumardella
  - †Shumardella fracta
- †Sievertsia
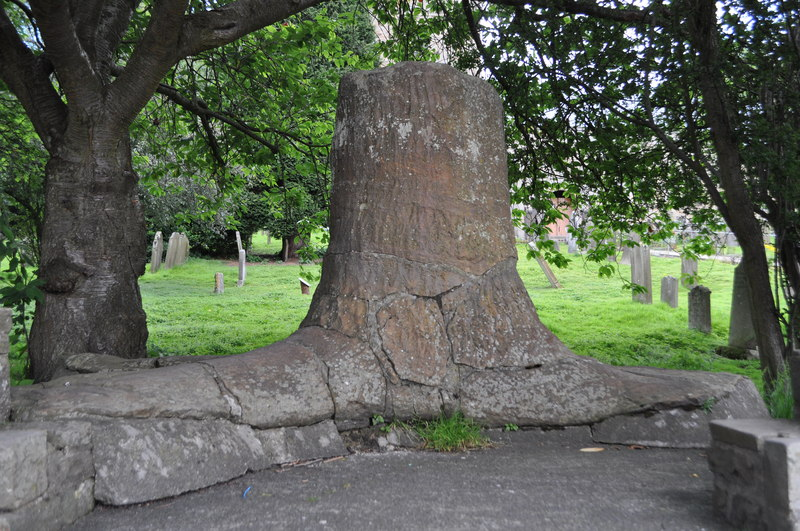
- Fossilized stump of the Carboniferous-Permian club moss relative Sigillaria
  †Sigillaria
  - †Sigillaria mamillaris – or unidentified comparable form
  - †Sigillaria rugosa
- †Sigillariostrobus
- †Silphion – type locality for genus
  - †Silphion latipenne – type locality for species
- †Similihariotta – type locality for genus
  - †Similihariotta dabasinskasi – type locality for species
- † Simplicius
  - †Simplicius simplex – type locality for species
- †Sinuspores
  - †Sinuspores sinuatus
- †Siphonocrinus
  - †Siphonocrinus nobilis
- †Skenidioides
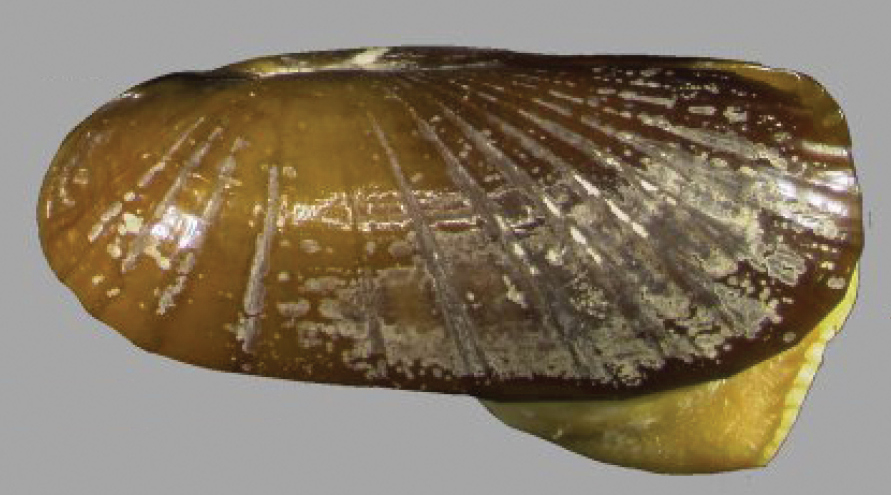
- Modern specimen of the marine bivalve Solemya
  Solemya
  - †Solemya trapezoides
- †Soleniscus
  - †Soleniscus primogenius
- †Solenochilus
  - †Solenochilus shumwayense – type locality for species
- †Sorellophrynus – type locality for genus
  - †Sorellophrynus carbonarius – type locality for species
- †Spackmanites
  - †Spackmanites facierugosus – or unidentified comparable form
  - †Spackmanites habibii
- †Sphaerexochus
  - †Sphaerexochus roemingeri
  - †Sphaerexochus romingeri
- †Sphaerocoryphe
  - †Sphaerocoryphe arachniformis
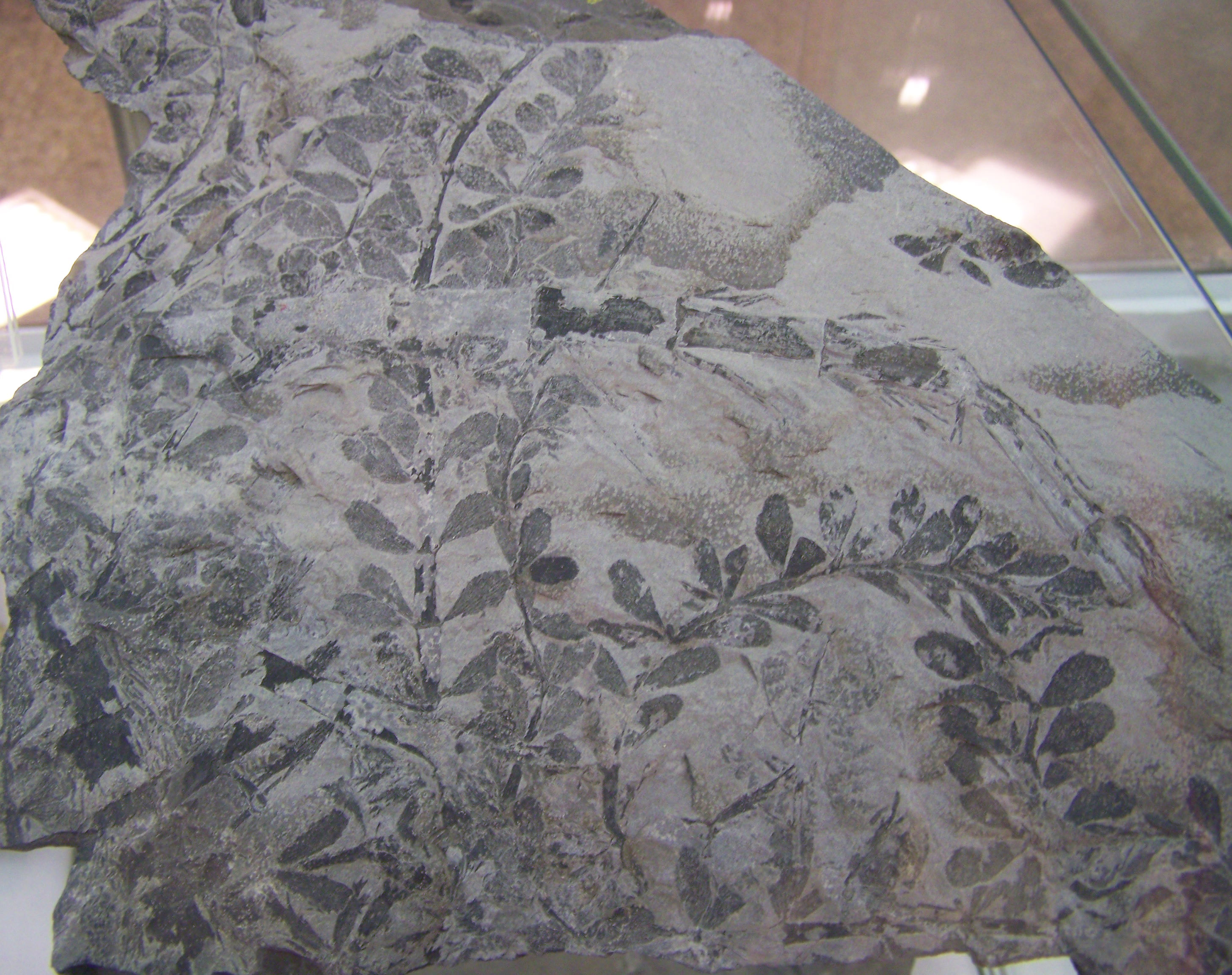
- Fossilized leaves and branches of the Devonian-Triassic horsetail relative Sphenophyllum
  †Sphenophyllum
  - †Sphenophyllum cuneifolium
  - †Sphenophyllum emarginatum
  - †Sphenophyllum longifolium – or unidentified comparable form
- †Sphenopteris
  - †Sphenopteris distans
  - †Sphenopteris preslesensis
- †Sphenosphaera
  - †Sphenosphaera consimilis – type locality for species
- †Spilaptera
  - †Spilaptera americana – type locality for species
- †Spilomastax – type locality for genus
  - †Spilomastax oligoneurus – type locality for species
- †Spinatrypa
  - †Spinatrypa bellula
  - †Spinatrypa occidentalis
- †Spinosporites
  - †Spinosporites exiguus
- †Spinyplatyceras
  - †Spinyplatyceras fornicatum
- †Spondylerpeton – type locality for genus
  - †Spondylerpeton spinatum – type locality for species
- †Srokalarva – type locality for genus
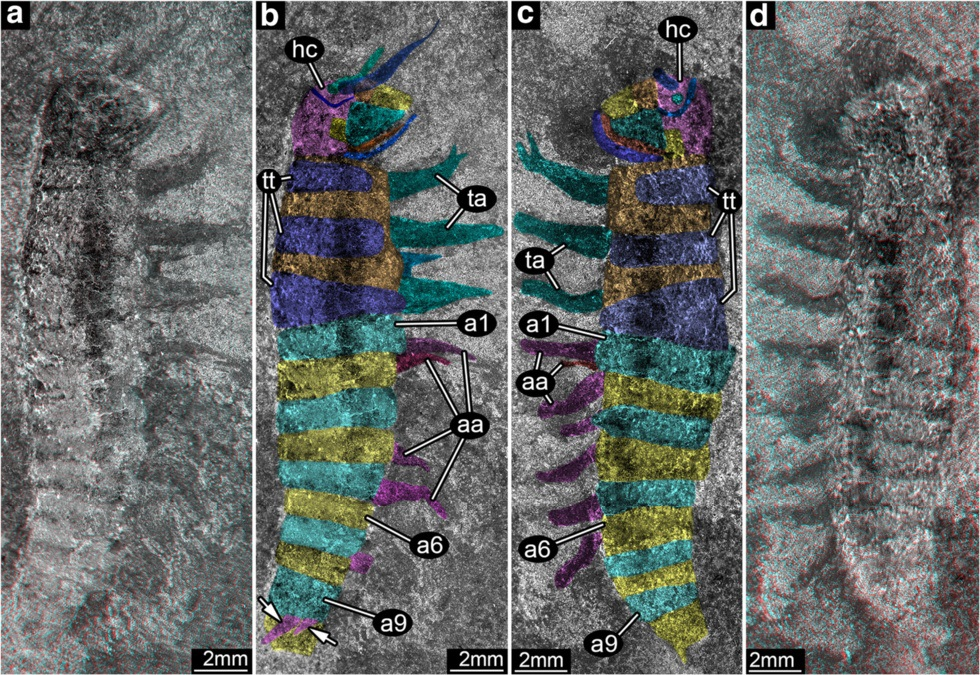
  - Srokalarva berthei part and counterpart
    †Srokalarva berthei – type locality for species
- †Staurocephalus
  - †Staurocephalus obsoleta
- †Stearoceras
  - †Stearoceras involutum – type locality for species
- †Stegerhynchus
  - †Stegerhynchus antiqua
  - †Stegerhynchus concinna
- †Stegocoelia
  - †Stegocoelia okawensis
- †Stellarocrinus
  - †Stellarocrinus bilineatus – type locality for species
  - †Stellarocrinus virgilensis – or unidentified comparable form
- †Stellatheca
  - †Stellatheca latiloba
  - †Stellatheca ornata
- †Stenopareia
- †Stenopecrinus
  - †Stenopecrinus planus – or unidentified comparable form
- †Stenoscisma
  - †Stenoscisma explanatum
- †Stephanopsis – type locality for genus
  - †Stephanopsis mirandus – type locality for species
- †Stephanozyga
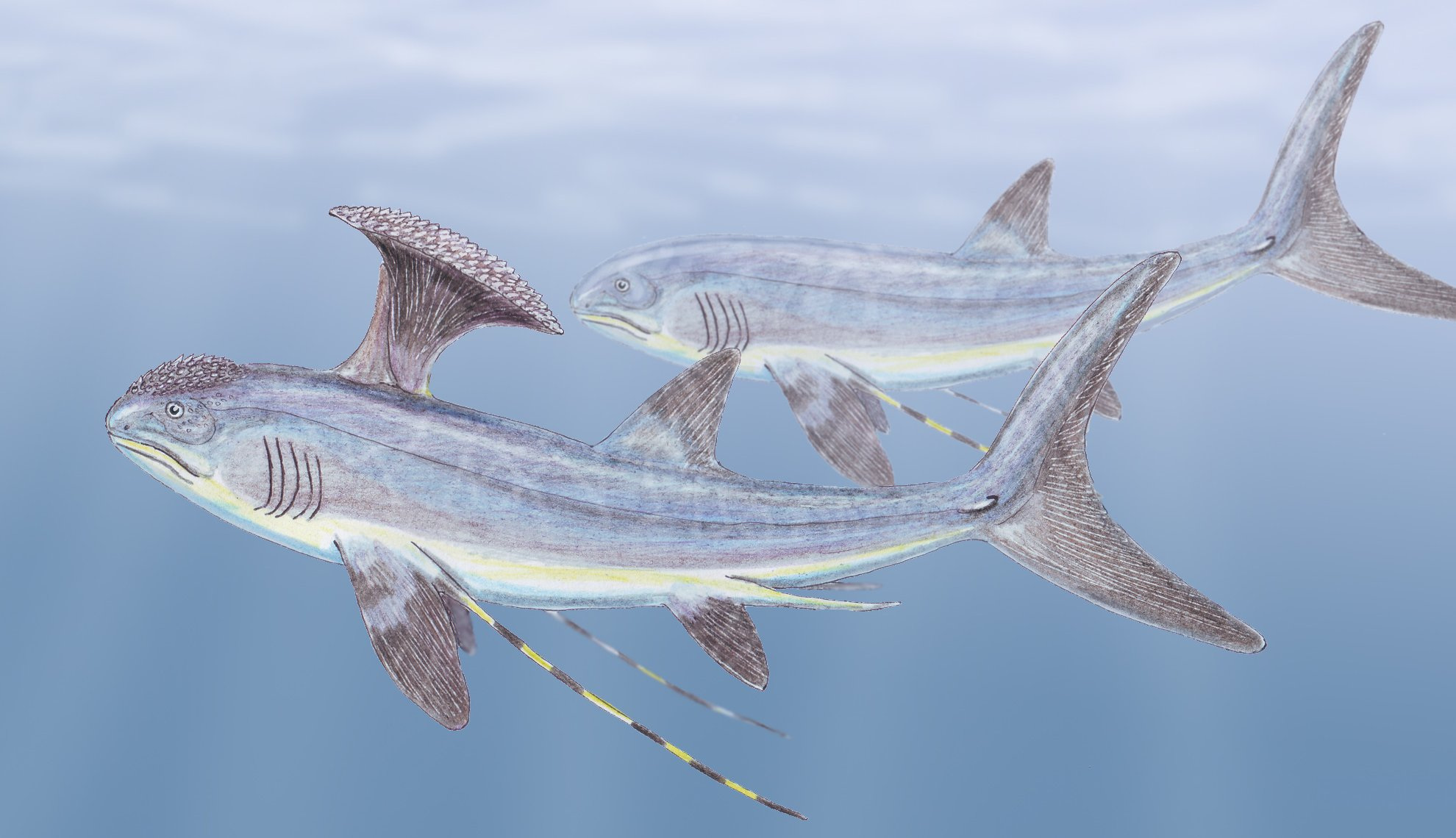
- Life restorations of a male (foreground) and female (background) of the Late Devonian-Carboniferous Chimaera relative Stethacanthus
  †Stethacanthus
  - †Stethacanthus altonensis
- †Stictopora
- †Stigmaria
  - †Stigmaria ficoides
  - †Stigmaria stellata
  - †Stigmaria wedingtonensis
- †Straparollus
  - †Straparollus subquadratus
- †Streblochondria
- †Striispirifer
- †Strobeus
  - †Strobeus brevis
  - †Strobeus paludinaeformis
- †Strophomena
- †Strophostylus
  - †Strophostylus wortheni – type locality for species
- †Styptobasis
  - †Styptobasis aculeata – type locality for species
- †Subglobosochonetes
  - †Subglobosochonetes jerseyensis
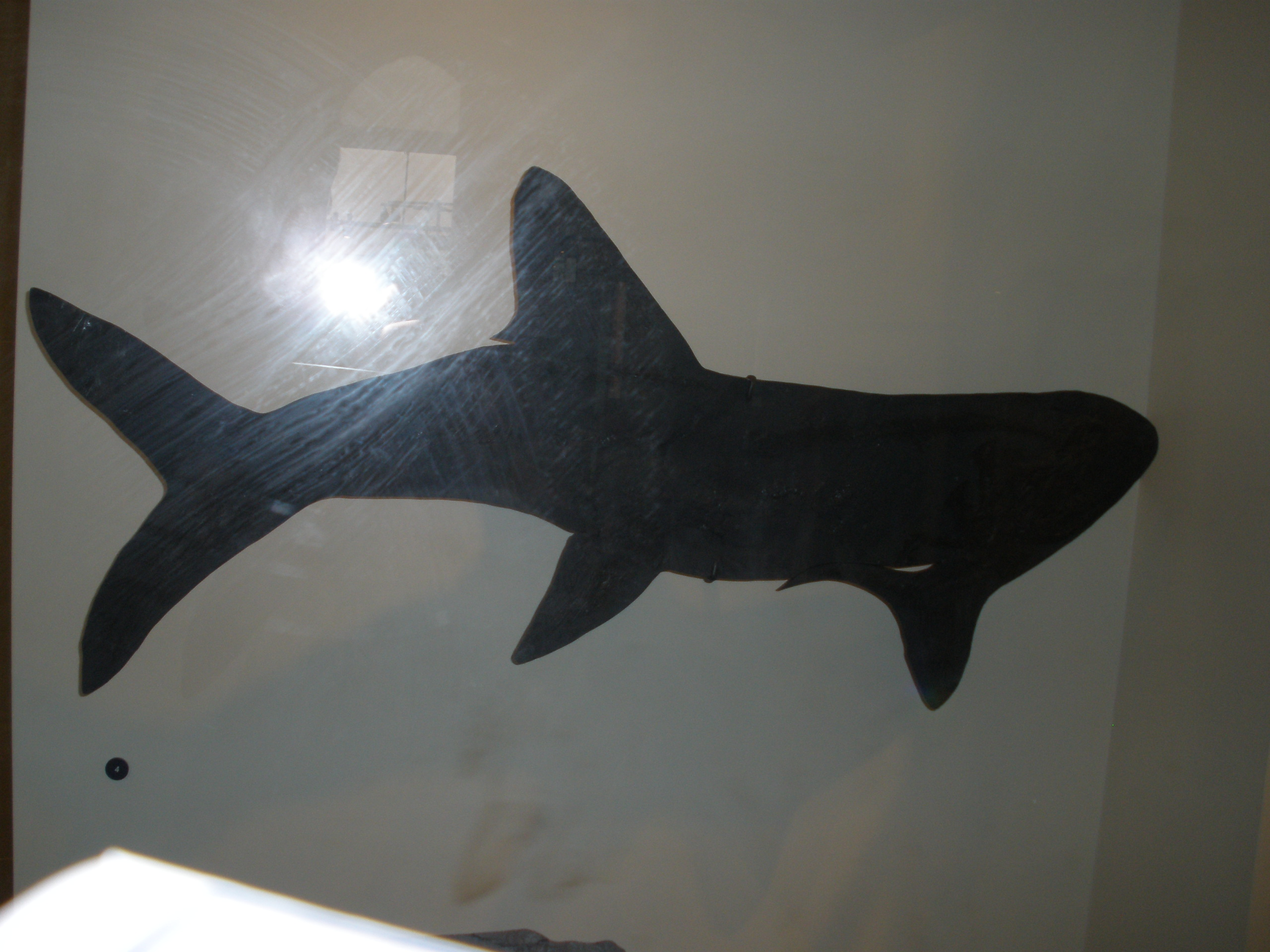
- Fossil of the Carboniferous Chimaera relative Symmorium
  †Symmorium – type locality for genus
  - †Symmorium reniforme – type locality for species
- †Syntonoptera – type locality for genus
  - †Syntonoptera schucherti – type locality for species
- †Sypharoptera – type locality for genus
  - †Sypharoptera pneuma – type locality for species
- †Syringopora
- †Syringothyris
  - †Syringothyris extenuata
  - †Syringothyris hannibalensis

== T ==
- †Tainoceras
  - †Tainoceras monilifer
  - †Tainoceras sexlineatum – type locality for species
- †Telangiopsis
- †Telangium
- †Telmatoscorpio – type locality for genus
  - †Telmatoscorpio brevipectus – type locality for species
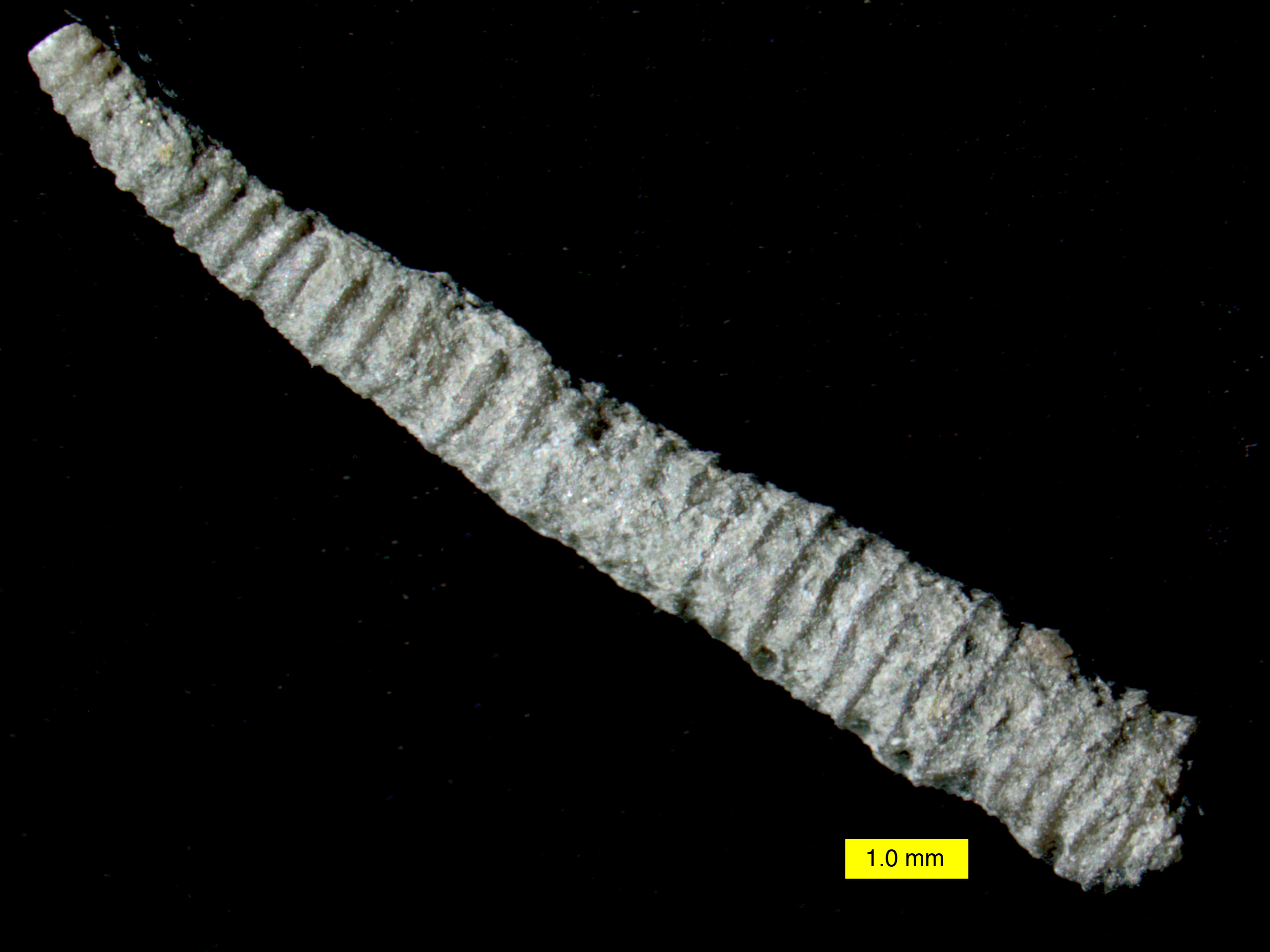
- Fossilized shell of the Early Ordovician-Late Devonian probable mollusc Tentaculites
  †Tentaculites
  - †Tentaculites bellulus
- †Terpnocrinus – type locality for genus
  - †Terpnocrinus ocoyaensis – type locality for species
- †Testajapyx – type locality for genus
  - †Testajapyx thomasi – type locality for species
- †Thalamocrinus
- †Thaleops
  - †Thaleops depressicapitata
- †Thallites
  - †Thallites dichopleurus
- †Thebanaspis
  - †Thebanaspis channahonensis
- †Thebesia
  - †Thebesia thebesensis
- †Thelyphrynus – type locality for genus
  - †Thelyphrynus elongatus – type locality for species
- †Thesoneura – type locality for genus
  - †Thesoneura americana – type locality for species
- †Thigriffides
  - †Thigriffides roundyi
- †Tholocrinus
  - †Tholocrinus discus – type locality for species
  - †Tholocrinus unionensis – type locality for species
- †Thuroholia
  - †Thuroholia cribriformis – type locality for species
  - †Thuroholia croneisi – type locality for species
- †Thyloblatta
- †Thymospora
  - †Thymospora pseudothiessenii
- †Titanoscorpio – type locality for genus
  - †Titanoscorpio douglassi – type locality for species
- †Torispora
  - †Torispora securis
- †Torynifer
  - †Torynifer setiger
- †Tranodis
  - †Tranodis castrensis
- †Tremanotus
- †Trepospira
  - †Trepospira depressa
- †Triamara
  - †Triamara tumida
  - †Triamara ventricosa
- †Trigera – tentative report
- †Trigonocarpus
- †Trigonoglossa – tentative report
  - †Trigonoglossa nebrascensis
- †Trigonotarbus
  - †Trigonotarbus carbonarius – type locality for species
- †Trihyphaecites
  - †Trihyphaecites triangulatus
- †Triquitrites
  - †Triquitrites additus
  - †Triquitrites arculatus – or unidentified comparable form
  - †Triquitrites bransonii
  - †Triquitrites crassus
  - †Triquitrites desperatus
  - †Triquitrites dividuus
  - †Triquitrites exiguus
  - †Triquitrites minutus
  - †Triquitrites protensus
  - †Triquitrites pulvinatus
  - †Triquitrites sculptilis
  - †Triquitrites spinosus
  - †Triquitrites subspinosus
  - †Triquitrites trigonappendix
  - †Triquitrites truncatus
- †Triticites
  - †Triticites pauper
  - †Triticites turgidus
- †Trochonema
  - †Trochonema umbilicata – or unidentified comparable form
- †Trochurus
  - †Trochurus welleri
- †Tropidodiscus
  - †Tropidodiscus compticarinatus
- †Tuberculatosporites
  - †Tuberculatosporites robustus
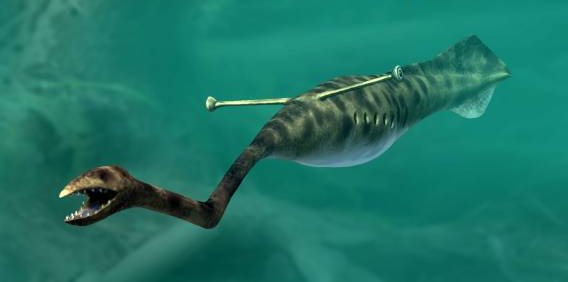
- Restoration of the mysterious Carboniferous life-form Tullimonstrum, or the Tully monster
  †Tullimonstrum – type locality for genus
  - †Tullimonstrum gregarius – type locality for species
- †Turnbullia – type locality for genus
  - †Turnbullia priscillae – type locality for species
- †Tylothyris
  - †Tylothyris missouriensis

== U ==
- †Ulocrinus
  - †Ulocrinus convexus
  - †Ulocrinus sangamonensis
- †Undulabucania
  - †Undulabucania punctifrons
- †Unispirifer
  - †Unispirifer senex

== V ==
- †Vallatisporites
- †Valmeyeraphycus
  - †Valmeyeraphycus jerseyensis
- †Valmeyerodendron
  - †Valmeyerodendron triangularifolium
- †Verrucosisporites
  - †Verrucosisporites compactus
  - †Verrucosisporites donarii
  - †Verrucosisporites firmus
  - †Verrucosisporites microtuberosus
  - †Verrucosisporites papulosus
  - †Verrucosisporites sifati
  - †Verrucosisporites verrucosus
  - †Verrucosisporites verus – or unidentified comparable form
- †Vesicaspora
  - †Vesicaspora wilsonii
- †Vestispora
  - †Vestispora colchesterensis
  - †Vestispora costata
  - †Vestispora fenestrata
  - †Vestispora foveata
  - †Vestispora irregularis
  - †Vestispora laevigata
  - †Vestispora profunda
  - †Vestispora pseudoreticulata
  - †Vestispora wanlessii
- †Volsellina
  - †Volsellina subelliptica

== W ==
- †Waeringoscorpio – type locality for genus
  - †Waeringoscorpio alliedensis – type locality for species
- †Wellerella
  - †Wellerella osagensis
  - †Wellerella tetrahedra
- †Welleriella – tentative report
- †Whidbornella
  - †Whidbornella curtirostris
- †Whitella
  - †Whitella sterlingensis
- †Whitfieldella
  - †Whitfieldella billingsana
- †Whittleseya
- †Wilkingia
  - †Wilkingia costatum
- †Wilsonites
  - †Wilsonites circularis
  - †Wilsonites delicatus
  - †Wilsonites vesicatus
- †Worthenia
  - †Worthenia tabulata

== X ==
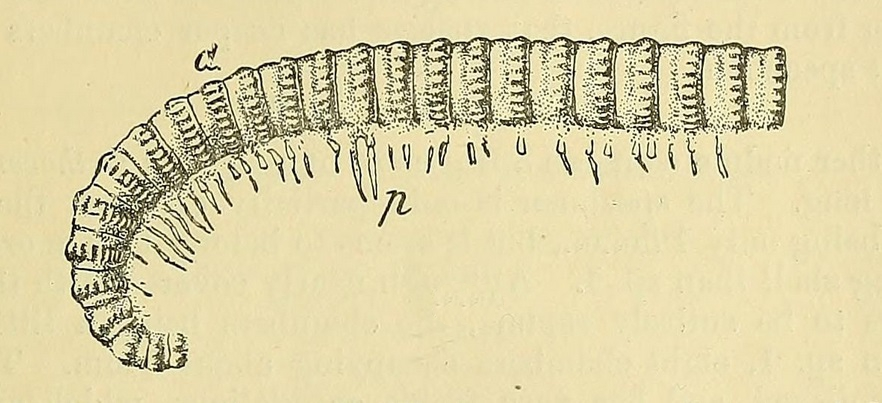
- Illustration of a fossil of the Carboniferous millipede Xyloiulus
  †Xyloiulus
  - †Xyloiulus frustulentus – type locality for species
  - †Xyloiulus mazonus – type locality for species

== Y ==
- †Yochelsonospira – type locality for genus
  - †Yochelsonospira tenuilineata – type locality for species
- Yoldia

== Z ==
- †Zangerlispongia – type locality for genus
  - †Zangerlispongia richardsoni – type locality for species
- †Zaphrenthis
  - †Zaphrenthis stokesi
- †Zeilleria
- †Zeugopleura
  - †Zeugopleura jeffersonensis
- †Zophocrinus – tentative report
- †Zosterogrammus – type locality for genus
  - †Zosterogrammus stichostethus – type locality for species
