= List of Platynus species =

This is a list of 194 species in the genus Platynus.

== Platynus species ==
- Platynus acuminatus
- Platynus acuniai (Darlington, 1937)
- Platynus aeneicauda (Bates, 1891)
- Platynus aeneosetosus Liebherr, 1989
- Platynus agilis LeConte, 1863
- Platynus aguadensis (Perrault, 1991)
- Platynus algirinus (Buquet, 1840)
- Platynus altifluminis (Darlington, 1936)
- Platynus amicorum J.Schmidt, 1996
- Platynus amone (Darlington, 1936)
- Platynus anatolicus J.Schmidt, 1996
- Platynus andrewesi (Morvan, 1996)
- Platynus angustatus Dejean, 1828
- Platynus arboreus (Mateu, 1979)
- Platynus asper Jedlicka, 1936
- Platynus assimilis (Paykull, 1790)
- Platynus azbleotroades (Morvan, 1996)
- Platynus ballorum Liebherr, 1992
- Platynus baragua (Darlington, 1936)
- Platynus barclayi J.Schmidt, 2009
- Platynus baroni (Casey, 1920)
- Platynus batesi (Morvan, 2004)
- Platynus benardi (Andrewes, 1924)
- Platynus biramosus (Darlington, 1939)
- Platynus bromeliarum (Darlington, 1937)
- Platynus bruesi (Darlington, 1936)
- Platynus bruneri (Darlington, 1937)
- Platynus brunneomarginatus (Mannerheim, 1843)
- Platynus bruskelchus (Morvan, 1996)
- Platynus bucheri (Darlington, 1937)
- Platynus caesus Scudder, 1890
- Platynus calathinus (Darlington, 1939)
- Platynus calvini Wickham, 1917
- Platynus carabiai (Darlington, 1937)
- Platynus casus Scudder, 1890
- Platynus cavatus (Bates, 1882)
- Platynus cavicola (Darlington, 1964)
- Platynus cazieri Liebherr & Will, 1996
- Platynus christophe (Darlington, 1936)
- Platynus cinchonae (Darlington, 1934)
- Platynus cincticollis (Say, 1823)
- Platynus cohni Liebherr & Will, 1996
- Platynus complanatus Dejean, 1828
- Platynus conicicollis (Chaudoir, 1879)
- Platynus constricticeps (Darlington, 1936)
- Platynus consularis (Casey, 1920)
- Platynus convexulus (Casey, 1920)
- Platynus cubensis (Darlington, 1937)
- Platynus cyanodorsalis Liebherr, 1989
- Platynus cychrinus (Darlington, 1936)
- Platynus darlingtoni (van Emden, 1949)
- Platynus daviesi Bousquet, 2012
- Platynus decentis (Say, 1823)
- Platynus depressus Dejean, 1831
- Platynus desuetus Scudder, 1890
- Platynus deuvei (Morvan, 1996)
- Platynus dianus (Jedlicka, 1934)
- Platynus dilapidatus Scudder, 1895
- Platynus dilatipes Liebherr, 1989
- Platynus dissipatus Scudder, 1890
- Platynus districtus (Casey, 1920)
- Platynus eulabes (Bates, 1889)
- Platynus eupunctatus Liebherr, 1987
- Platynus exterminatus Scudder, 1900
- Platynus faber (Darlington, 1936)
- Platynus falli (Darlington, 1936)
- Platynus ferghanicus (Belousov, 1991)
- Platynus florissantensis Wickham, 1913
- Platynus fractilateralis Liebherr, 1987
- Platynus fractilinea (Darlington, 1934)
- Platynus franiai Liebherr, 1992
- Platynus fratrorum (Darlington, 1937)
- Platynus fukiensis (Jedlicka, 1956)
- Platynus fur (Andrewes, 1930)
- Platynus glacialis (Reitter, 1877)
- Platynus grandicollis (Motschulsky, 1850)
- Platynus grassator (Andrewes, 1932)
- Platynus haemorrhous (Perty, 1830)
- Platynus halli Scudder, 1890
- Platynus hamatus Liebherr, 1989
- Platynus harttii Scudder, 1890
- Platynus henvelus (Morvan, 1996)
- Platynus herculeanus Liebherr & Godwin, 2004
- Platynus hindei Scudder, 1890
- Platynus hoffeinsorum (J.Schmidt, 2015)
- Platynus hypolithos (Say, 1823)
- Platynus immarginatus J.Schmidt, 2009
- Platynus incisus (Andrewes, 1927)
- Platynus indecentis Liebherr and Will, 1996
- Platynus inops (Chaudoir, 1879)
- Platynus insculptipennis Wickham, 1917
- Platynus interglacialis Scudder, 1900
- Platynus interitus Scudder, 1900
- Platynus isthmiacus (Motschulsky, 1866)
- Platynus jaegeri (Dejean, 1831)
- Platynus jamaicae (Darlington, 1953)
- Platynus kazuyoshii Morita & Kurosa, 1994
- Platynus klausnitzeri (J.Schmidt, 2005)
- Platynus kleebergi J.Schmidt, 2009
- Platynus klickai Jedlicka, 1931
- Platynus komarovi (Lafer, 1976)
- Platynus krynickii (Sperk, 1835)
- Platynus kucerai (Morvan, 2004)
- Platynus laeviceps (Darlington, 1939)
- Platynus leiroides (Perrault, 1991)
- Platynus lewisi (Darlington, 1953)
- Platynus lindrothi Baehr, 1982
- Platynus lineopunctatus Liebherr, 1989
- Platynus livens (Gyllenhal, 1810)
- Platynus logicus (Casey, 1920)
- Platynus longaevus Scudder, 1900
- Platynus longiventris Mannerheim, 1825
- Platynus lyratus (Chaudoir, 1879)
- Platynus macer (Darlington, 1934)
- Platynus macropterus (Chaudoir, 1879)
- Platynus magnus (Bates, 1873)
- Platynus mannerheimi Dejean
- Platynus mannerheimii (Dejean, 1828)
- Platynus marcus (Darlington, 1936)
- Platynus matsumurai (Habu, 1973)
- Platynus mediopterus (Darlington, 1937)
- Platynus medius (Darlington, 1937)
- Platynus megalops (Bates, 1882)
- Platynus meurguesae (Morvan, 1996)
- Platynus meurguesianus (Morvan, 1996)
- Platynus montezumae (Bates, 1878)
- Platynus nuceus (Fairmaire, 1887)
- Platynus opaculus Leconte, 1863
- Platynus ovatulus (Bates, 1884)
- Platynus ovipennis (Mannerheim, 1843)
- Platynus pakistanensis (Morvan, 1996)
- Platynus panamensis (Casey, 1920)
- Platynus parallelosomus Liebherr, 1987
- Platynus parmarginatus Hamilton, 1893
- Platynus pecki Barr, 1982
- Platynus peirolerii Bassi, 1834
- Platynus pinarensis (Darlington, 1937)
- Platynus platynidioides (Perrault, 1991)
- Platynus pleistocenicus Wickham, 1917
- Platynus praedator (Andrewes, 1930)
- Platynus prognathus Van Dyke, 1926
- Platynus protensus (A.Morawitz, 1863)
- Platynus proximus (J.Frivaldszky, 1879)
- Platynus punctus (Darlington, 1936)
- Platynus pygmaeus Liebherr, 1992
- Platynus ramoni (Darlington, 1939)
- Platynus rarus J.Schmidt, 2009
- Platynus rastafarius Liebherr, 1987
- Platynus richteri (Morvan, 1996)
- Platynus robustus (Chaudoir, 1878)
- Platynus rougemonti (Morvan, 1996)
- Platynus roysi (Darlington, 1937)
- Platynus rubrofemoratus Liebherr, 1989
- Platynus rufiventris (Van Dyke, 1926)
- Platynus santarosae (Perrault, 1991)
- Platynus satsunanus Habu, 1974
- Platynus schnitteri J.Schmidt, 2009
- Platynus scriptellus (Darlington, 1939)
- Platynus scriptus (Darlington, 1939)
- Platynus scrobiculatus (Fabricius, 1801)
- Platynus senex Scudder, 1878
- Platynus setiporus Reitter, 1893
- Platynus sexualis K. & J.Daniel, 1898
- Platynus staveni J.Schmidt, 2009
- Platynus stricticollis (Bates, 1878)
- Platynus strictinotum Liebherr, 1989
- Platynus subangustus (Darlington, 1937)
- Platynus subcordens (Darlington, 1936)
- Platynus subgelidus Wickham, 1917
- Platynus subovalis (Darlington, 1936)
- Platynus subovatus (Putzeys, 1875)
- Platynus takabai (Habu, 1962)
- Platynus tartareus Scudder, 1900
- Platynus tasmantus (Morvan, 1996)
- Platynus tenuicollis (LeConte, 1846)
- Platynus teriolensis K. & J.Daniel, 1898
- Platynus tipoto (Darlington, 1936)
- Platynus tolucensis (Straneo, 1957)
- Platynus transcibao (Darlington, 1939)
- Platynus trifoveolatus Beutenmüller, 1903
- Platynus trisetosus (Landin, 1955)
- Platynus tropicus (Motschulsky, 1865)
- Platynus turberensis (Perrault, 1991)
- Platynus turquinensis (Darlington, 1937)
- Platynus umbripennis (Casey, 1920)
- Platynus ustus (Andrewes, 1927)
- Platynus vagepunctatus (Darlington, 1934)
- Platynus valens (Bates, 1891)
- Platynus viator (Andrewes, 1931)
- Platynus visitor (Darlington, 1936)
- Platynus wassulandi Jedlicka, 1962
- Platynus willbergi Reitter, 1891
- Platynus wolla (Darlington, 1936)
- Platynus zengae (Morvan & Tian, 2003)
