= List of the prehistoric life of Illinois =

This list of the prehistoric life of Illinois contains the various prehistoric life-forms whose fossilized remains have been reported from within the US state of Illinois.

== Precambrian ==
The Paleobiology Database records no known occurrences of Precambrian fossils in Illinois.

== Paleozoic ==
=== Selected Paleozoic taxa of Illinois ===
- †Achatella
- †Actinoceras
- †Alethopteris
  - †Alethopteris decurrens
  - †Alethopteris lonchitica
  - †Alethopteris owenii
  - †Alethopteris serlii
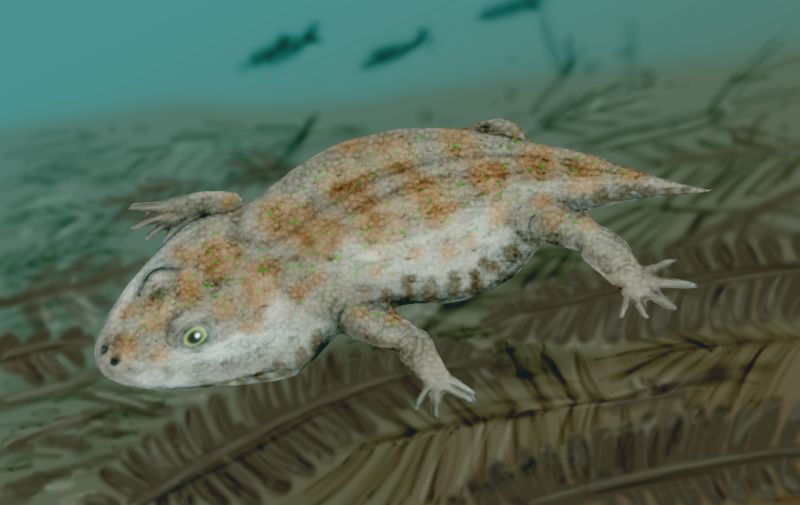
- Life restoration of the Carboniferous amphibian Amphibamus
  †Amphibamus – type locality for genus
  - †Amphibamus grandiceps – type locality for species
- †Amphiscapha
- †Amynilyspes – type locality for genus
- †Annularia
  - †Annularia asteris – or unidentified comparable form
  - †Annularia stellata
- †Anomphalus – type locality for genus
- †Anthracoceras
- †Archaeocidaris – tentative report
- †Archaeopteris
- †Archimedes
  - †Archimedes communis
  - †Archimedes compactus
  - †Archimedes invaginatus
  - †Archimedes lativolvis
  - †Archimedes macfarlani
  - †Archimedes swallovanus
  - †Archimedes terebriformis
- †Archimylacris
- †Arctinurus
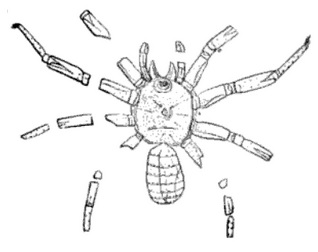
- Illustration of a fossil of the Carboniferous-Permian spider Arthrolycosa. Charles Emerson Beecher (1889).
  †Arthrolycosa – type locality for genus
- †Artisia
- †Asterotheca
  - †Asterotheca miltoni – or unidentified comparable form
- †Asyncritus – type locality for genus
- †Athyris
- †Atrypa
  - †Atrypa reticularis – report made of unidentified related form or using admittedly obsolete nomenclature
- †Aviculopecten
  - †Aviculopecten fasciculatus
- † Avonia
- †Bandringa – type locality for genus
- †Bassleroceras
- †Bellerophon
  - †Bellerophon spergensis
- †Belinurus
- †Bembexia
- †Blattoidea
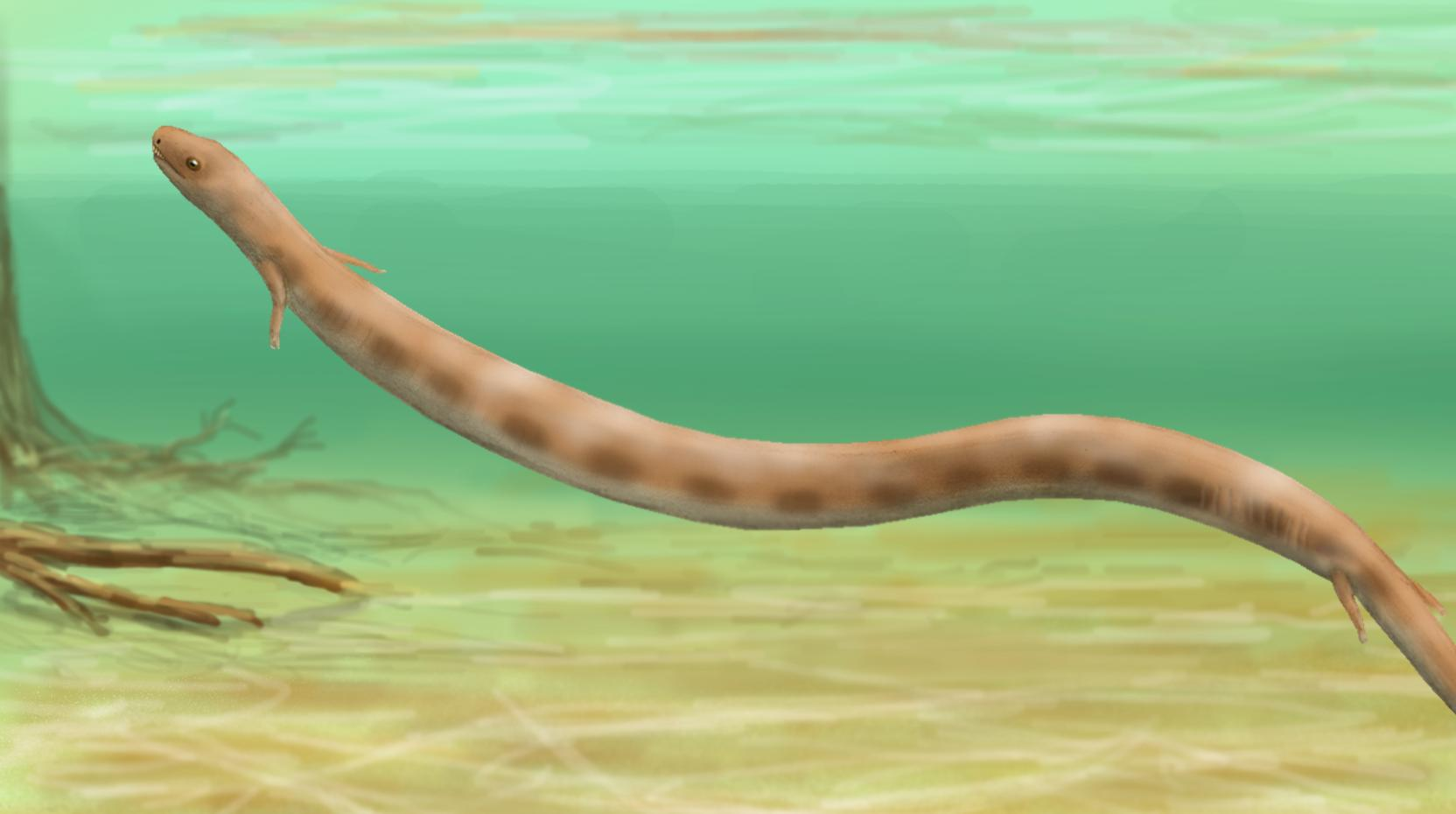
- Life restoration of the Carboniferous amphibian Brachydectes
  †Brachydectes
  - †Brachydectes newberryi
- †Bumastus
  - †Bumastus armatus – or unidentified comparable form
  - †Bumastus chicagoensis
  - †Bumastus cuniculus – or unidentified comparable form
  - †Bumastus graftonensis
  - †Bumastus insignis
  - †Bumastus springfieldensis
  - †Bumastus transversalis
- †Calamites
  - †Calamites suckowii
- †Callipteridium
- †Calvinia
- †Calymene
  - †Calymene breviceps
  - †Calymene celebra
- †Calyptaulax
- †Camarotoechia
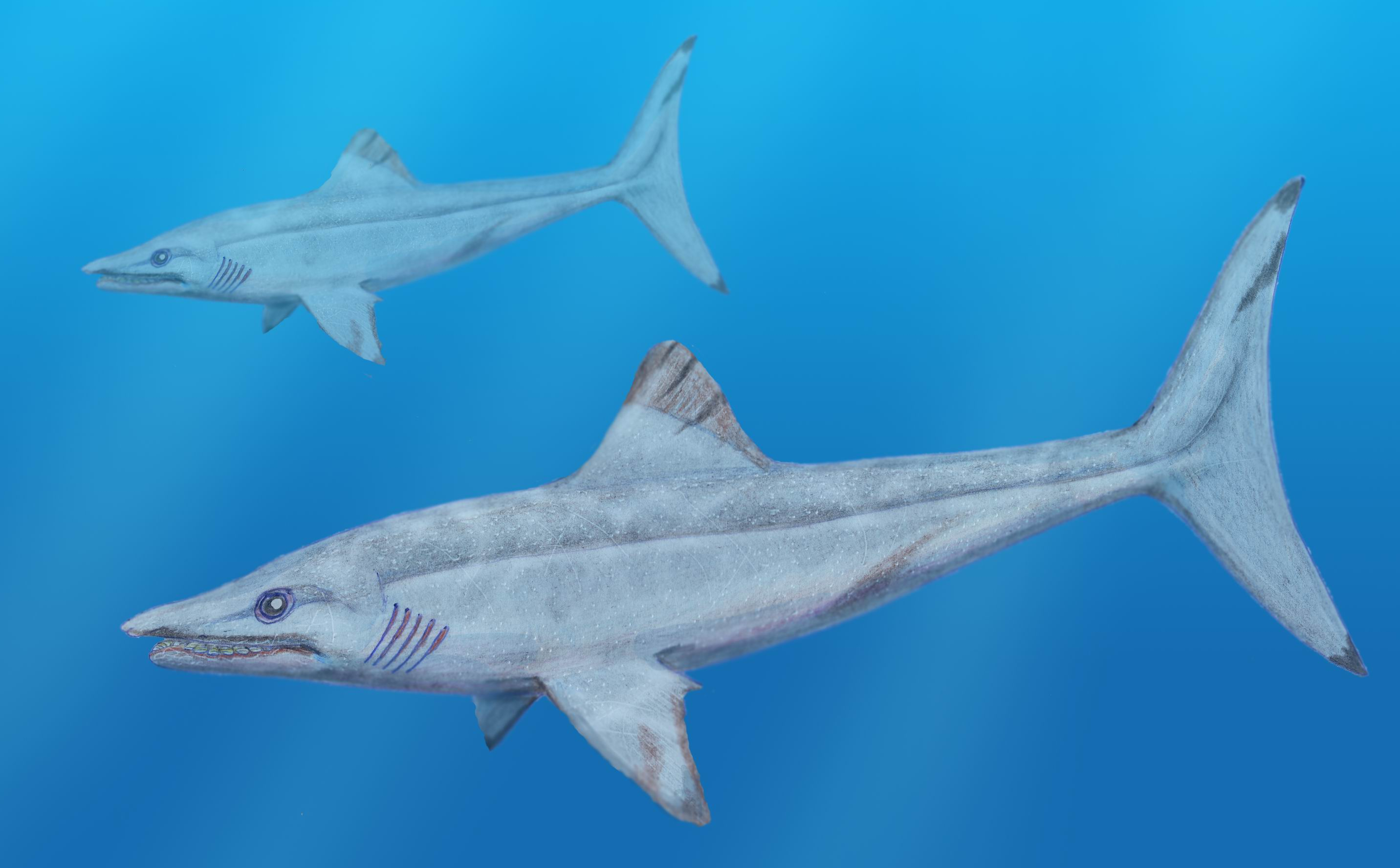
- Life restoration of the Carboniferous Chimaera relative Caseodus
  †Caseodus
- †Cephalerpeton – type locality for genus
  - †Cephalerpeton ventriarmatum – type locality for species
- †Ceratiocaris
- †Ceratocephala
- †Ceraurinella
- †Ceraurinus
- †Ceraurus
- †Cheirurus
- †Chonetes
  - †Chonetes ornatus
- †Cleiothyridina
  - †Cleiothyridina atrypoides
  - †Cleiothyridina sublamellosa
- †Clepsydrops – type locality for genus
- †Cliftonia
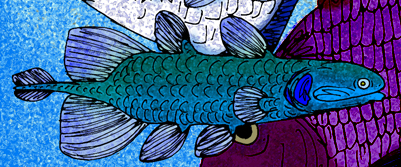
- Life restoration (foreground) of the Permian-Jurassic lobe-finned fish Coelacanthus
  †Coelacanthus
- †Composita
  - †Composita subtilita
  - †Composita trinuclea
- †Conocardium
- †Cooperoceras
- †Cordaicarpus
- †Cordaites
  - †Cordaites principalis
- †Cornulites
- †Crania
- †Craniops
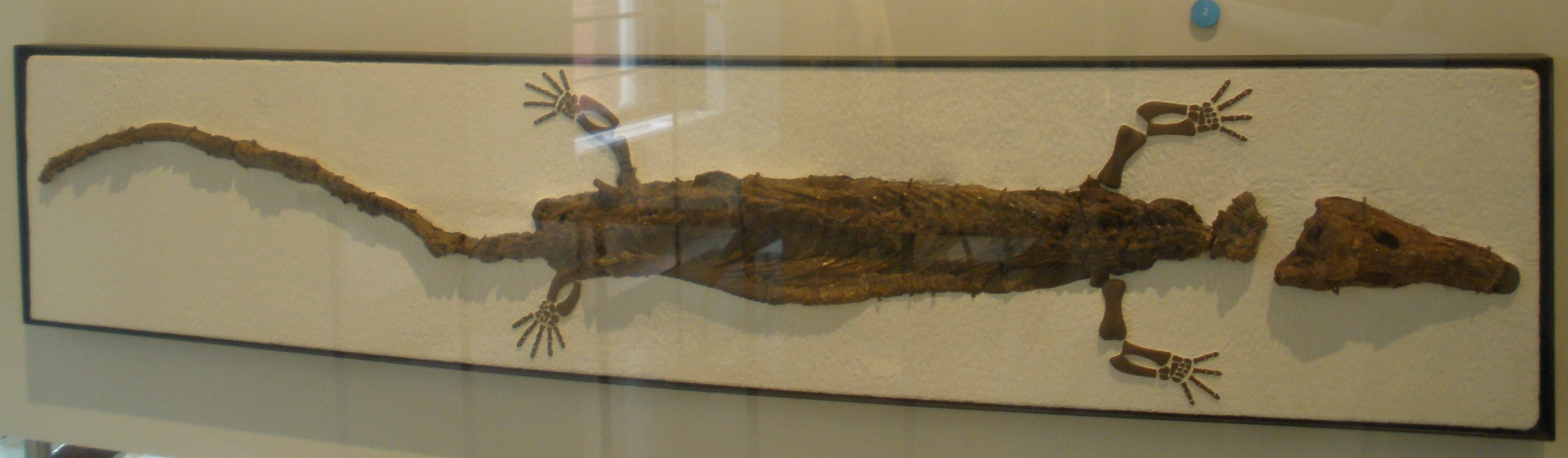
- Fossilized skeleton of the Carboniferous-Permian reptile relative Cricotus
  †Cricotus – type locality for genus
- †Crotalocrinites
- †Ctenacanthus
  - †Ctenacanthus buttersi – type locality for species
- †Curriella – tentative report
- †Cyathocrinites
- †Cyclonema
- †Cyclus
- †Cyphaspis
- †Cyrtoceras
- †Dalmanites
- †Deiphon
- †Dicoelosia
- †Dictyonema
- †Dimerocrinites
  - †Dimerocrinites occidentalis
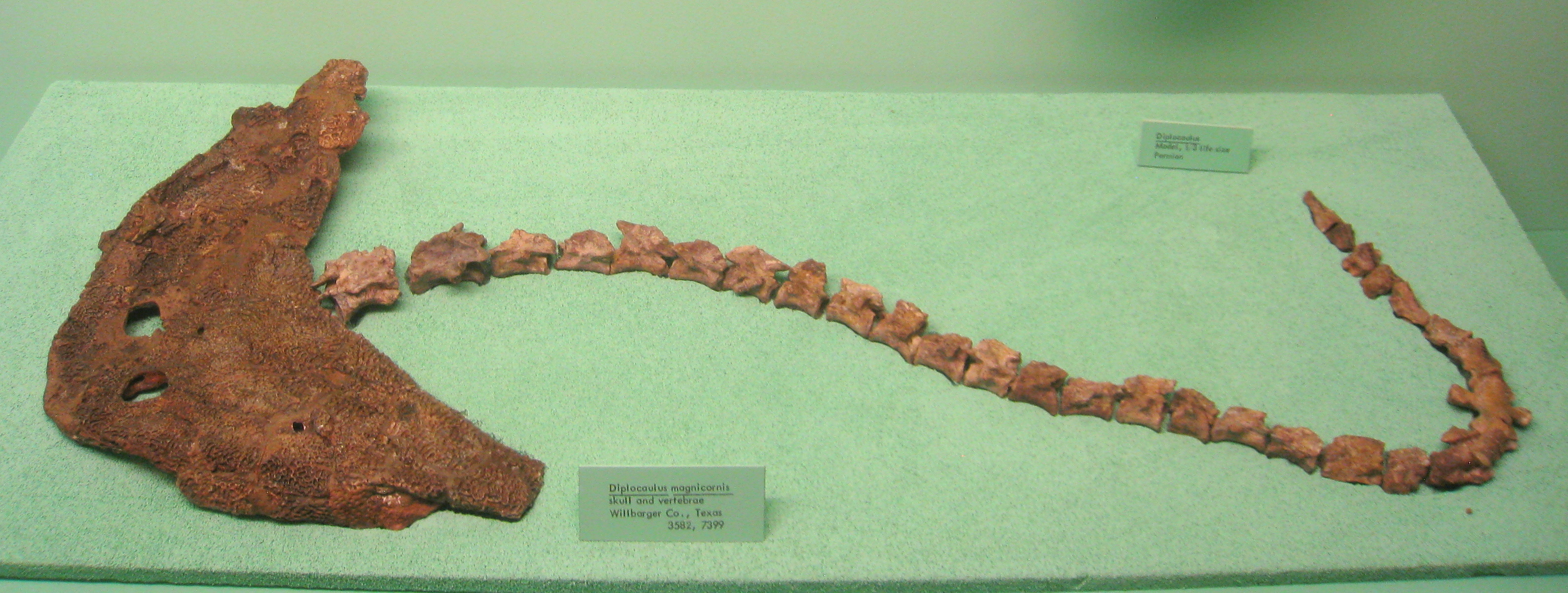
- Fossilized axial skeleton of the Carboniferous-Permian amphibian Diplocaulus
  †Diplocaulus – type locality for genus
- †Domatoceras
- †Echinaria
- †Edestus
- †Edmondia
- †Elonichthys
- †Encrinurus
- †Eodictyonella
- †Eophacops
  - †Eophacops handwerki
- †Eospirifer
  - †Eospirifer radiatus
- †Erratencrinurus
- †Eucalyptocrinites
  - †Eucalyptocrinites crassus
- †Euomphalus
  - †Euomphalus planodorsatus
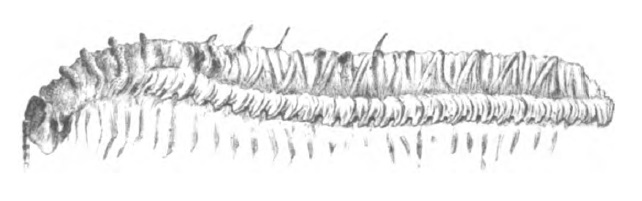
- Illustration of fossil of the Carboniferous millipede Euphoberia
  †Euphoberia – type locality for genus
  - †Euphoberia armigera – type locality for species
- †Favosites
- †Fenestella
- †Fletcheria
- †Gerarus – type locality for genus
- †Glikmanius
  - †Glikmanius occidentalis
- †Glyptambon
- †Glyptopleura
- †Gondolella
- †Graeophonus
  - †Graeophonus scudderi – type locality for species
- †Greenops
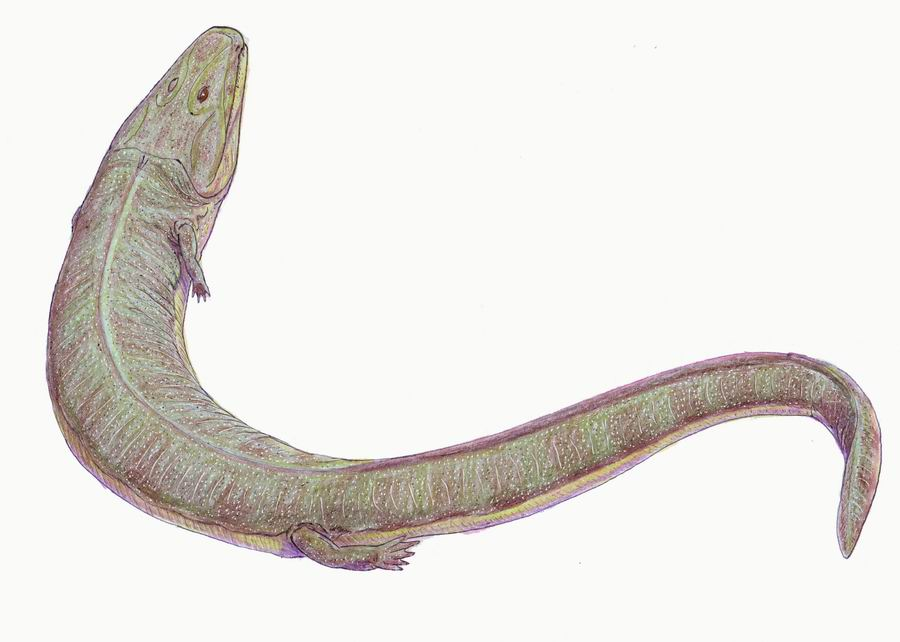
- Life restoration of the Carboniferous four-limbed animal precursor Greererpeton
  †Greererpeton
- †Hallopora – tentative report
- †Halysites
- †Harpidium
- †Helenodora – type locality for genus
  - †Helenodora inopinata – type locality for species
- †Heliomeroides
- †Holia
- †Hyolithes
- †Ilyodes
- †Isodectes
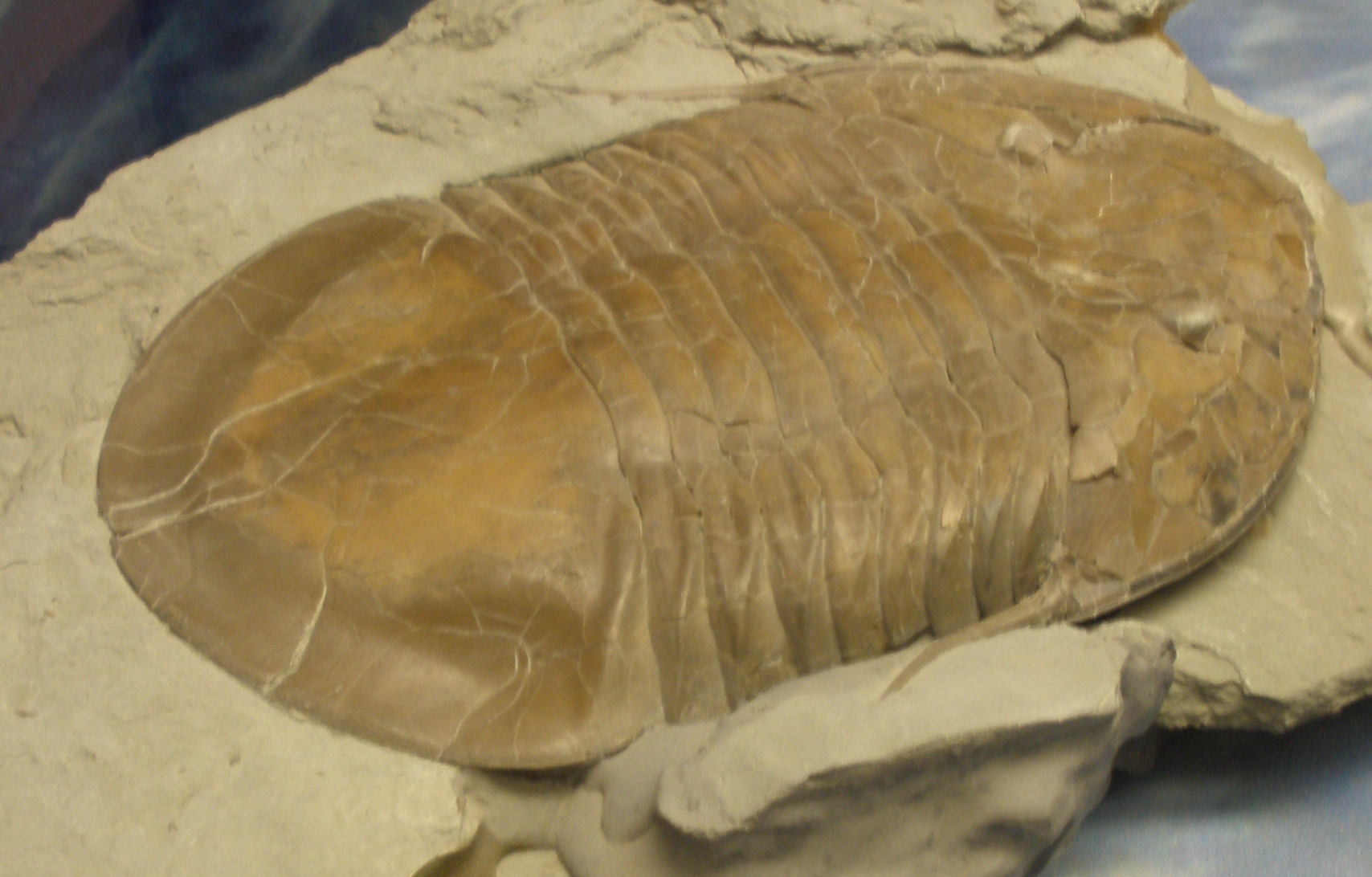
- Fossil of the Middle-Late Ordovician giant trilobite Isotelus.
  †Isotelus
  - †Isotelus gigas
  - †Isotelus maximus
- †Kionoceras
- †Latzelia – type locality for genus
  - †Latzelia primordialis – type locality for species
- †Lepidodendron
  - †Lepidodendron aculeatum
- †Lepidophyllum
- †Lepidostrobus
- †Lichas
- †Lingula
- †Liroceras
- Lithophaga – tentative report
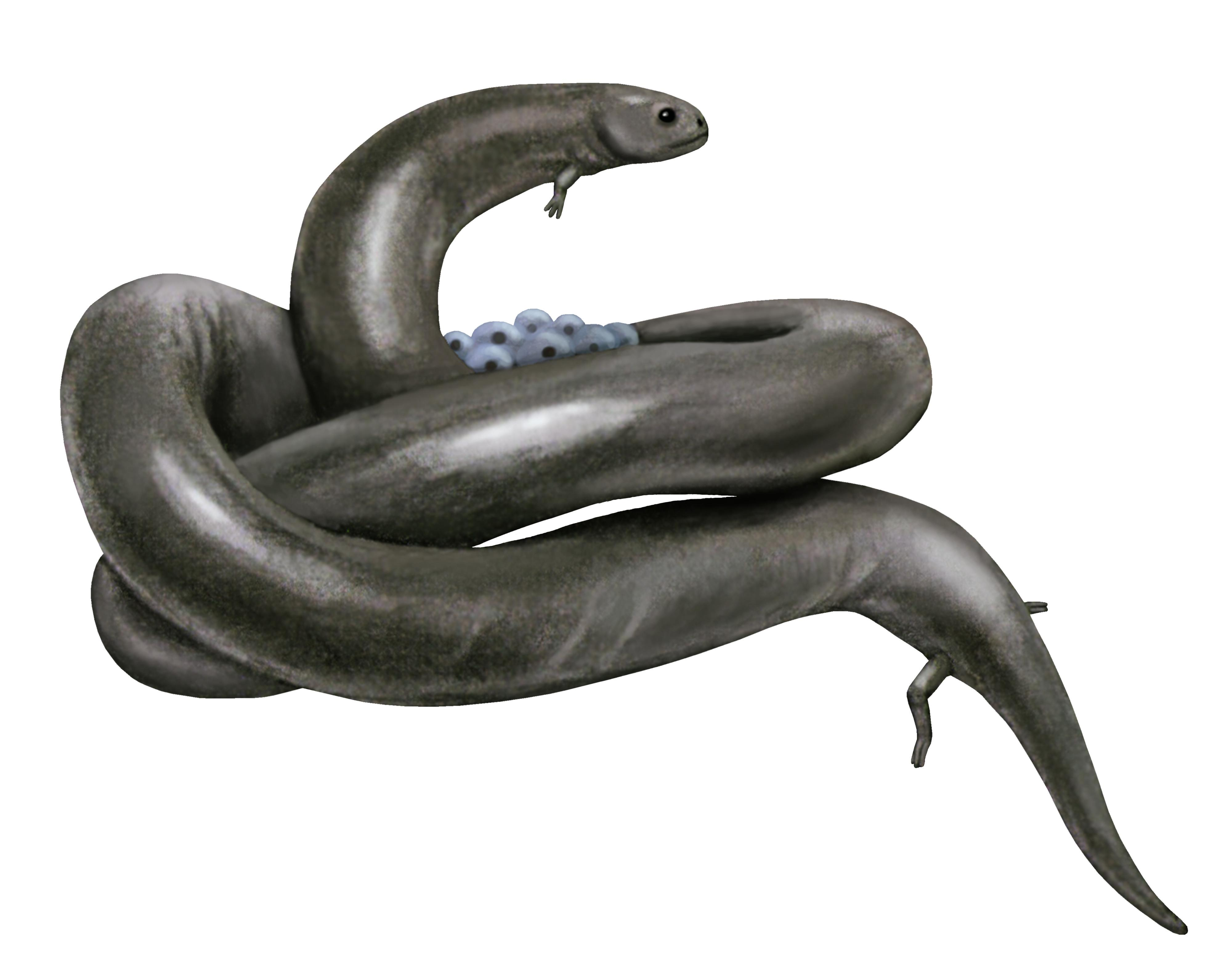
- Life restoration of the Permian snake-like amphibian Lysorophus showing speculative egg-coiling behavior
  †Lysorophus – type locality for genus
- †Marsupiocrinus
- †Meristina
- †Metacoceras
- †Milosaurus – type locality for genus
- †Monograptus
  - †Monograptus dubius
- †Murchisonia
- †Naticopsis
  - †Naticopsis carleyana
  - †Naticopsis planifrons
  - †Naticopsis waterlooensis – type locality for species
- †Nemastomoides – type locality for genus
- †Neospirifer
  - †Neospirifer dunbari
  - †Neospirifer triplicatus
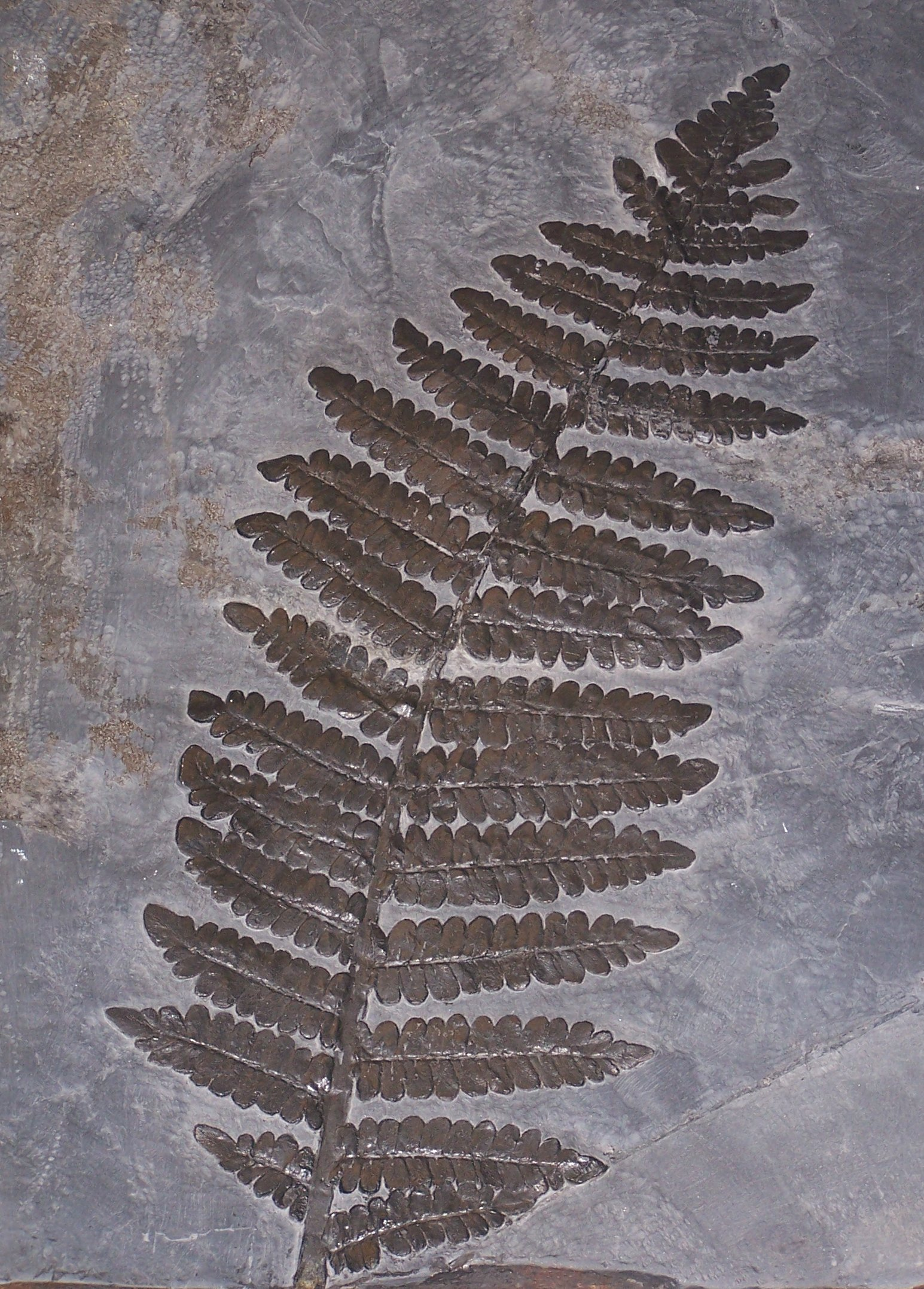
- Fossilized frond of the Carboniferous seed fern Neuropteris
  †Neuropteris
  - †Neuropteris ovata
  - †Neuropteris rarinervis
  - †Neuropteris scheuchzeri
  - †Neuropteris tenuifolia
- †Nodonema
- Nucula
- †Nuculoidea – tentative report
- †Onychopterella – tentative report
- †Palenarthrus – type locality for genus
  - †Palenarthrus impressus – type locality for species
- †Paraisobuthus
- †Pecopteris
  - †Pecopteris plumosa
- †Pentremites
  - †Pentremites tulipaformis
- †Periechocrinus
- †Phacops
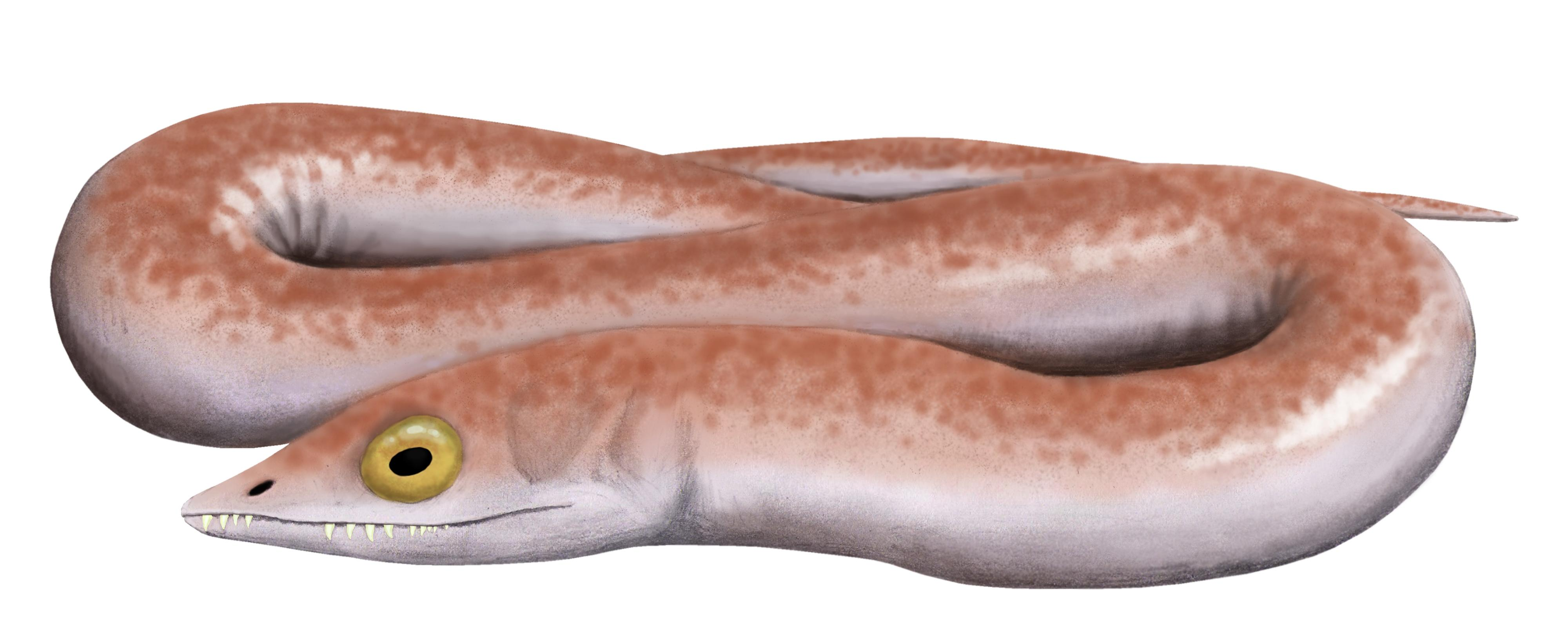
- Life restoration of the Carboniferous-Permian amphibian Phlegethontia.
  †Phlegethontia
  - †Phlegethontia longissima – type locality for species
- †Phragmolites
- †Platyceras
- †Platysomus
- †Platystrophia
- †Plicochonetes
- †Polysentor – type locality for genus
- †Priapulites – type locality for genus
  - †Priapulites konecniorum – type locality for species
- †Prodentalium
- †Proetus
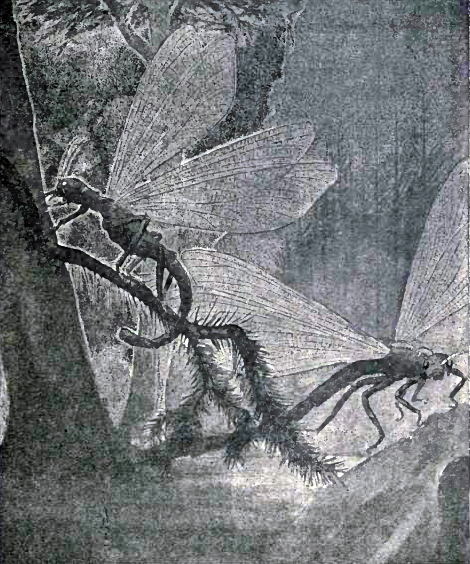
- Life restoration of the Carboniferous insects Protophasma and Titanophasma
  †Protophasma
- †Protopilio
- †Pseudophlegethontia – type locality for genus
  - †Pseudophlegethontia turnbullorum – type locality for species
- †Pterochiton
- †Pterotheca
- †Rasstriga – type locality for genus
  - †Rasstriga americana – type locality for species
- †Remopleurides
- †Rhodea
- †Rhynchonella
- †Saccoglossus
- †Sagenodus
- †Samaropsis
- †Savagella
- †Scepasma – type locality for genus
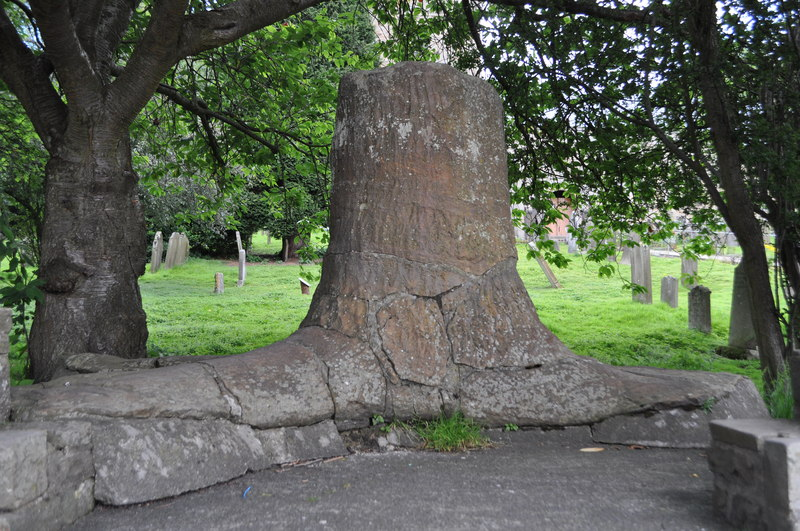
- Fossilized stump of the Carboniferous-Permian club moss relative Sigillaria
  †Sigillaria
- †Silphion – type locality for genus
- † Simplicius
- †Skenidioides
- Solemya
- †Solenochilus
- †Sphaerexochus
- †Sphaerocoryphe
- †Sphenophyllum
  - †Sphenophyllum cuneifolium
  - †Sphenophyllum emarginatum
  - †Sphenophyllum longifolium – or unidentified comparable form
- †Sphenopteris
- †Stearoceras
- †Stethacanthus
  - †Stethacanthus altonensis
- †Stigmaria
- †Strophomena
- †Symmorium – type locality for genus
- †Syringopora
- †Tainoceras
- †Tentaculites
- †Tranodis
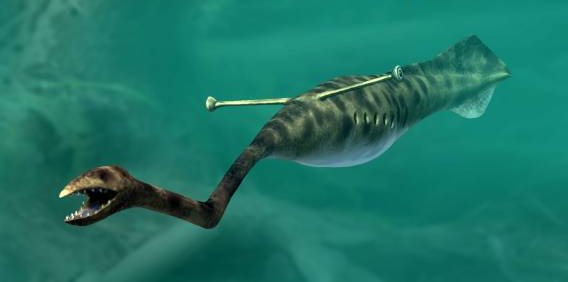
- Restoration of the mysterious Carboniferous life-form Tullimonstrum, or the Tully monster
  †Tullimonstrum – type locality for genus
- †Wilkingia
- †Worthenia
- †Xyloiulus
- Yoldia

== Mesozoic ==
The Paleobiology Database records no known occurrences of Mesozoic fossils in Illinois.

== Cenozoic ==
- Agabus
  - †Agabus praelugens – type locality for species
  - †Agabus savagei – type locality for species
- †Anomodon – type locality for genus
  - †Anomodon snyderi – type locality for species
- †Araloselachus
  - †Araloselachus cuspidata
- Arvicola
- †Bananogmius
  - †Bananogmius crieleyi – or unidentified comparable form
- Bison
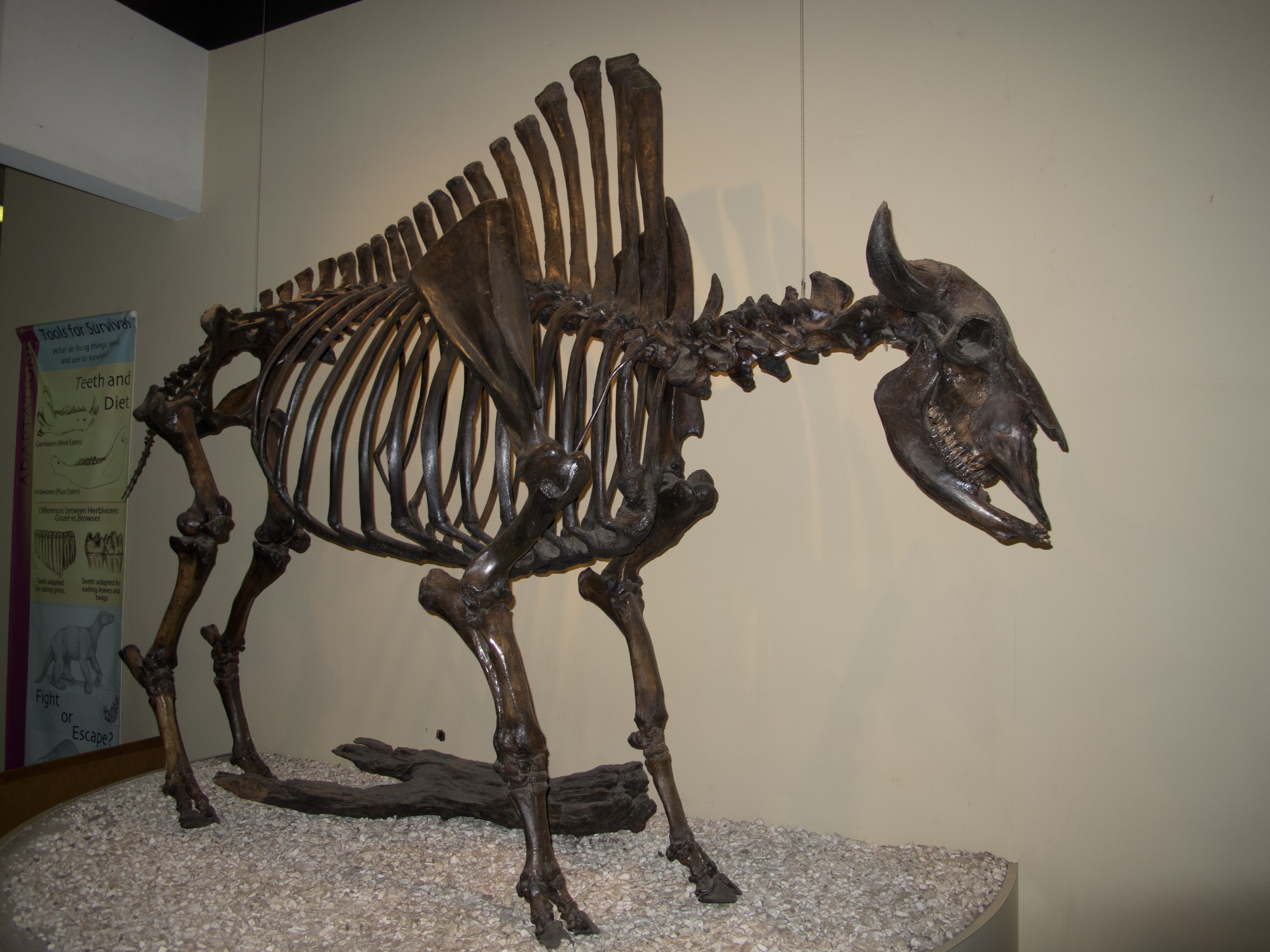
  - Mounted fossilized skeleton of the Pleistocene Bison antiquus, or ancient bison
    †Bison antiquus
  - †Bison bison
- Blarina
- †Bootherium
  - †Bootherium bombifrons
- Carabus
  - †Carabus maeander
- Castor
  - †Castor canadensis
- †Castoroides
  - †Castoroides ohioensis
- †Cervalces
  - †Cervalces latifrons – tentative report
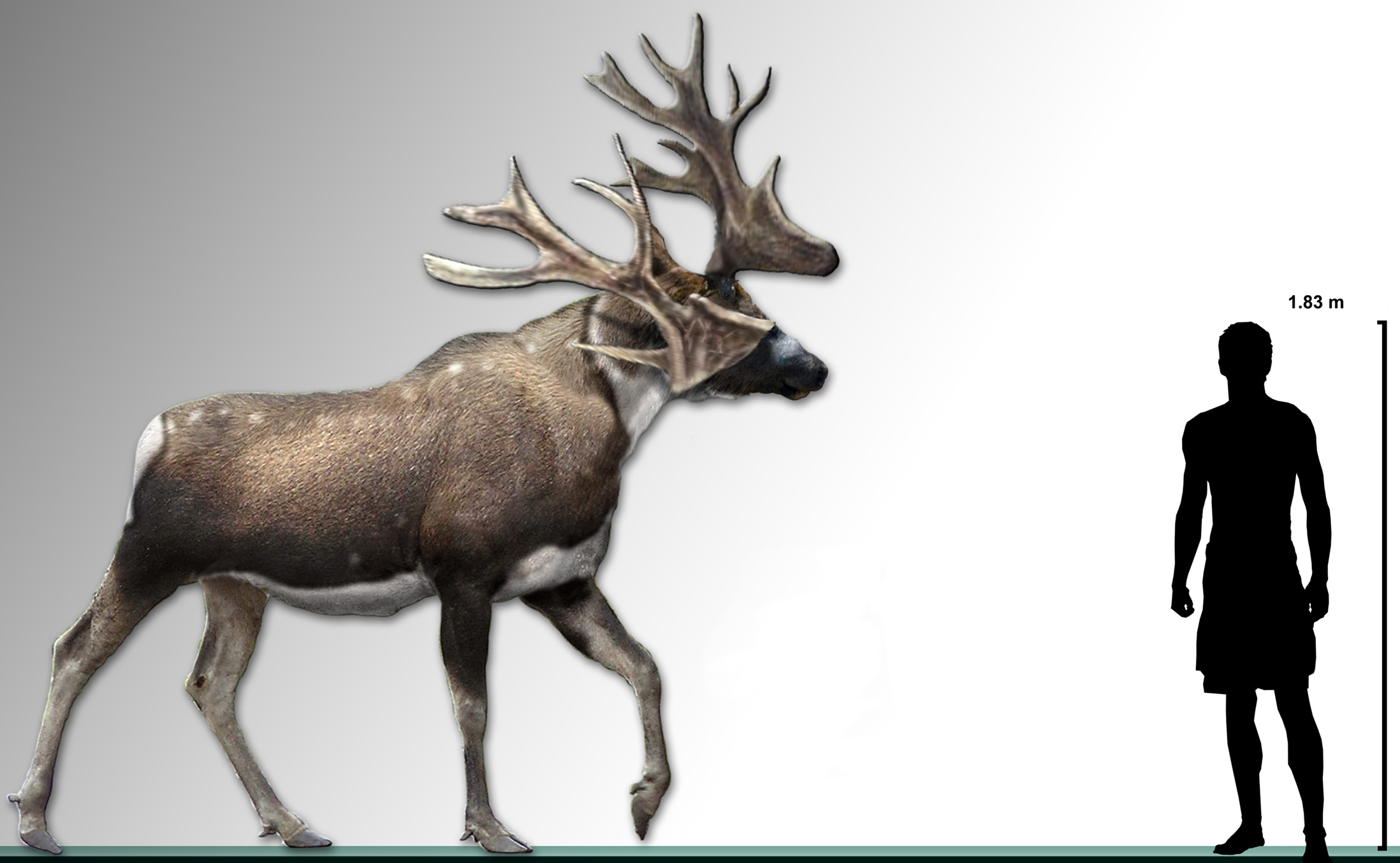
  - Life restoration of the Pleistocene Cervalces scotti, or stag-moose
    †Cervalces scotti
- Chelonia
- Chlaenius
  - †Chlaenius plicatipennis – type locality for species
- Conopeum
  - †Conopeum damicornis
- Donacia
  - †Donacia stirioides – type locality for species
- Equus
- Esox
- †Euceratherium
  - †Euceratherium collinum
- Geomys
  - †Geomys bursarius
- †Ischyodus
  - †Ischyodus williamsae
- Lasiopodomys
  - †Lasiopodomys deceitensis
- †Mammut
  - †Mammut americanum
- †Mammuthus
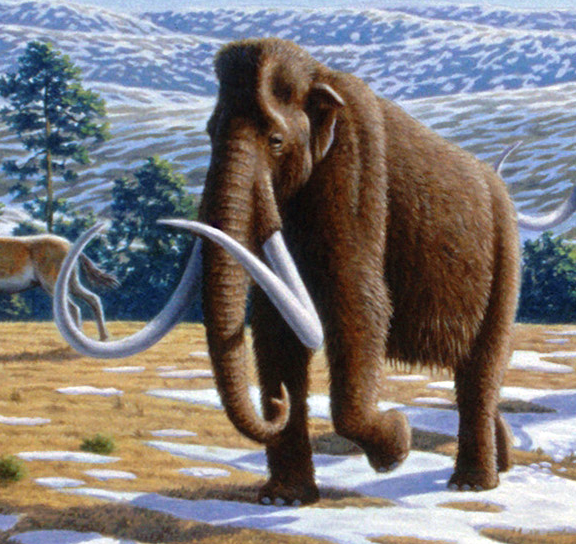
  - Restoration of a herd of Mammuthus primigenius, or wooly mammoths
    †Mammuthus primigenius
- Marmota
  - †Marmota monax
- †Megalonyx
  - †Megalonyx jeffersonii
- Mesalia
  - †Mesalia alabamiensis
- Microtus
  - †Microtus paroperarius
- Natica
  - †Natica reversa
- Olophrum
  - †Olophrum henryi – type locality for species
- Ostrea
  - †Ostrea pulaskensis
- †Pachyrhizodus
  - †Pachyrhizodus caninus
- Patrobus
  - †Patrobus henshawi – type locality for species
- Peromyscus
- Pitar – tentative report
  - †Pitar ripleyanus
- Pituophis
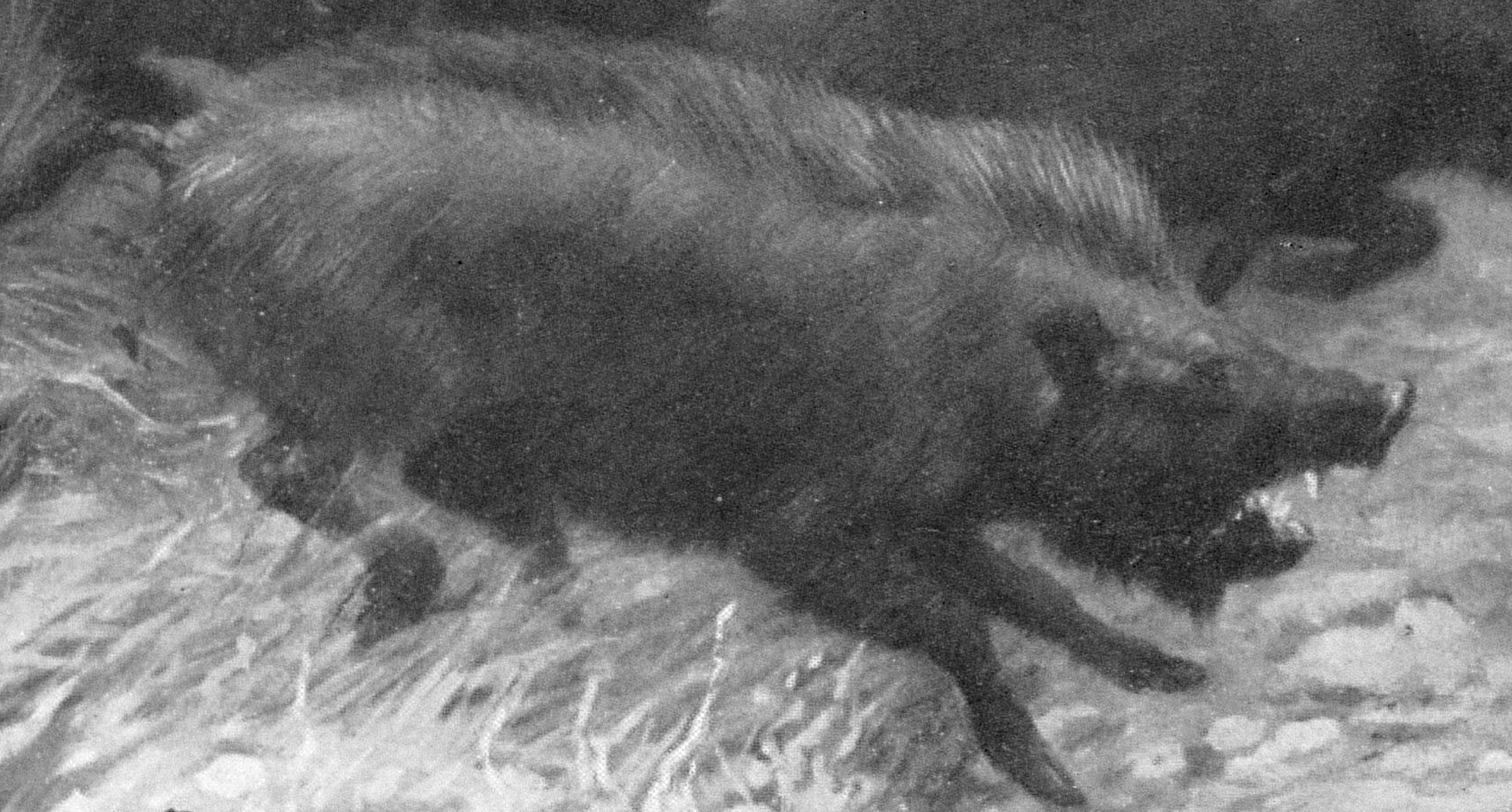
- Restoration of a herd of alarmed Miocene-Pleistocene peccaries of the genus Platygonus. Charles R. Knight (1922).
  †Platygonus – type locality for genus
  - †Platygonus compressus – type locality for species
  - †Platygonus cumberlandensis – tentative report
- Platynus
  - †Platynus calvini – type locality for species
  - †Platynus pleistocenicus – type locality for species
  - †Platynus subgelidus – type locality for species
- Procyon
  - †Procyon lotor – type locality for species
- †Propenser
  - †Propenser hewletti
- †Ptychodus
- Rangifer
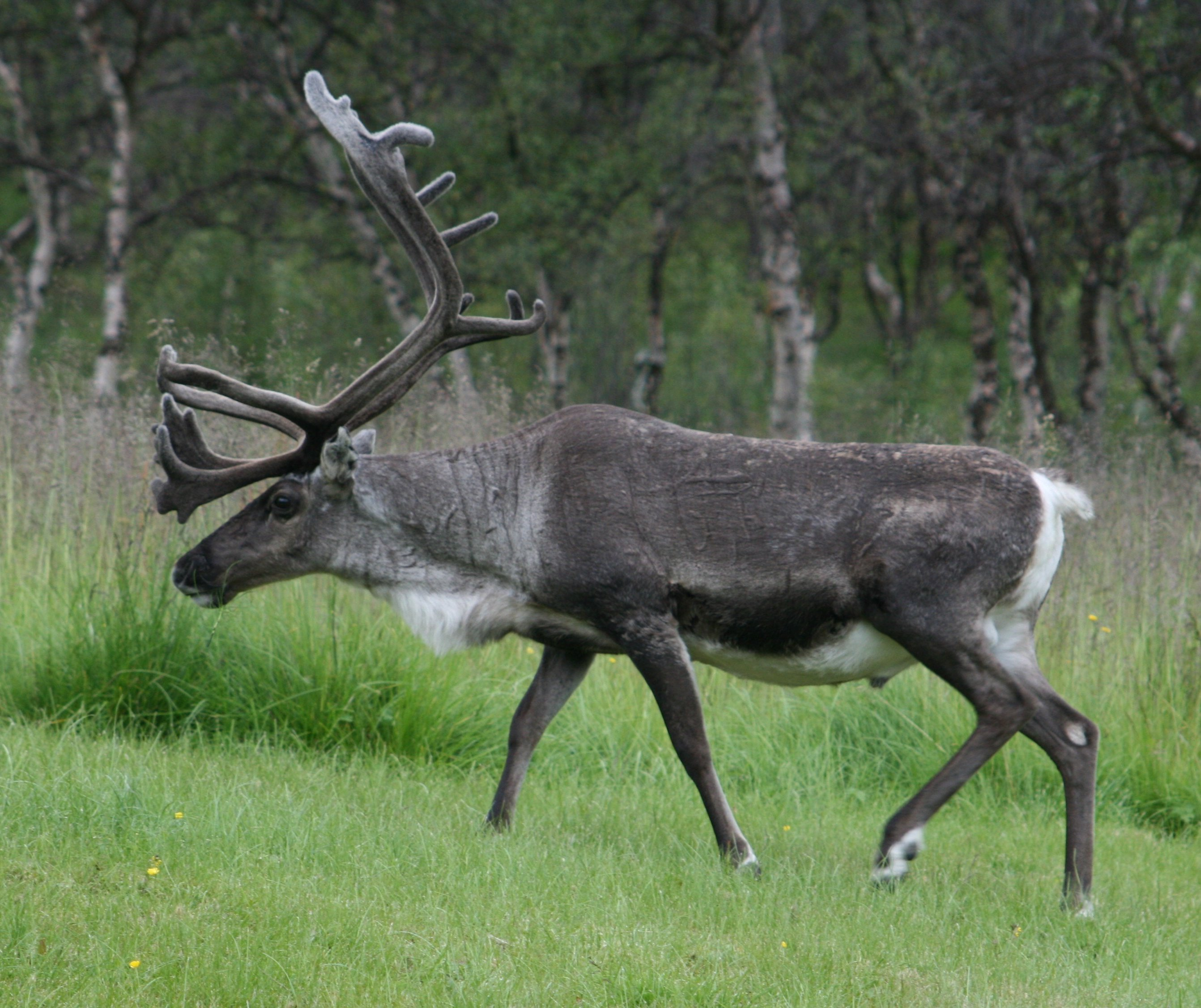
  - A living Rangifer tarandus, or reindeer
    †Rangifer tarandus
- †Sangamona
  - †Sangamona fugitiva
- Sorex
- †Strepsidura
  - †Strepsidura contorea
- Sylvilagus
  - †Sylvilagus floridanus
- Ursus
  - †Ursus americanus
- Venericardia
  - †Venericardia smithii
