= Anomodon =

Anomodon may refer to:

- Anomodon (mammal), an extinct mammal
- Anomodon (plant), a genus of moss
- Anomodon huenei, a junior synonym of Diictodon feliceps
