= Platynus maculicollis =

Scientific classification
- Kingdom: Animalia
- Phylum: Arthropoda
- Class: Insecta
- Order: Coleoptera
- Suborder: Adephaga
- Family: Carabidae
- Genus: Platynus
- Species: P. maculicollis

Binomial name
- Platynus maculicollis (Chaudoir, 1879)

Species of beetle

Platynus maculicollis (common names: grease bug, overflow bug) is a ground beetle.

It is common in California, where it is occasionally a pest in houses because of its disagreeable odor when crushed, and because it nibbles bread and meats.
