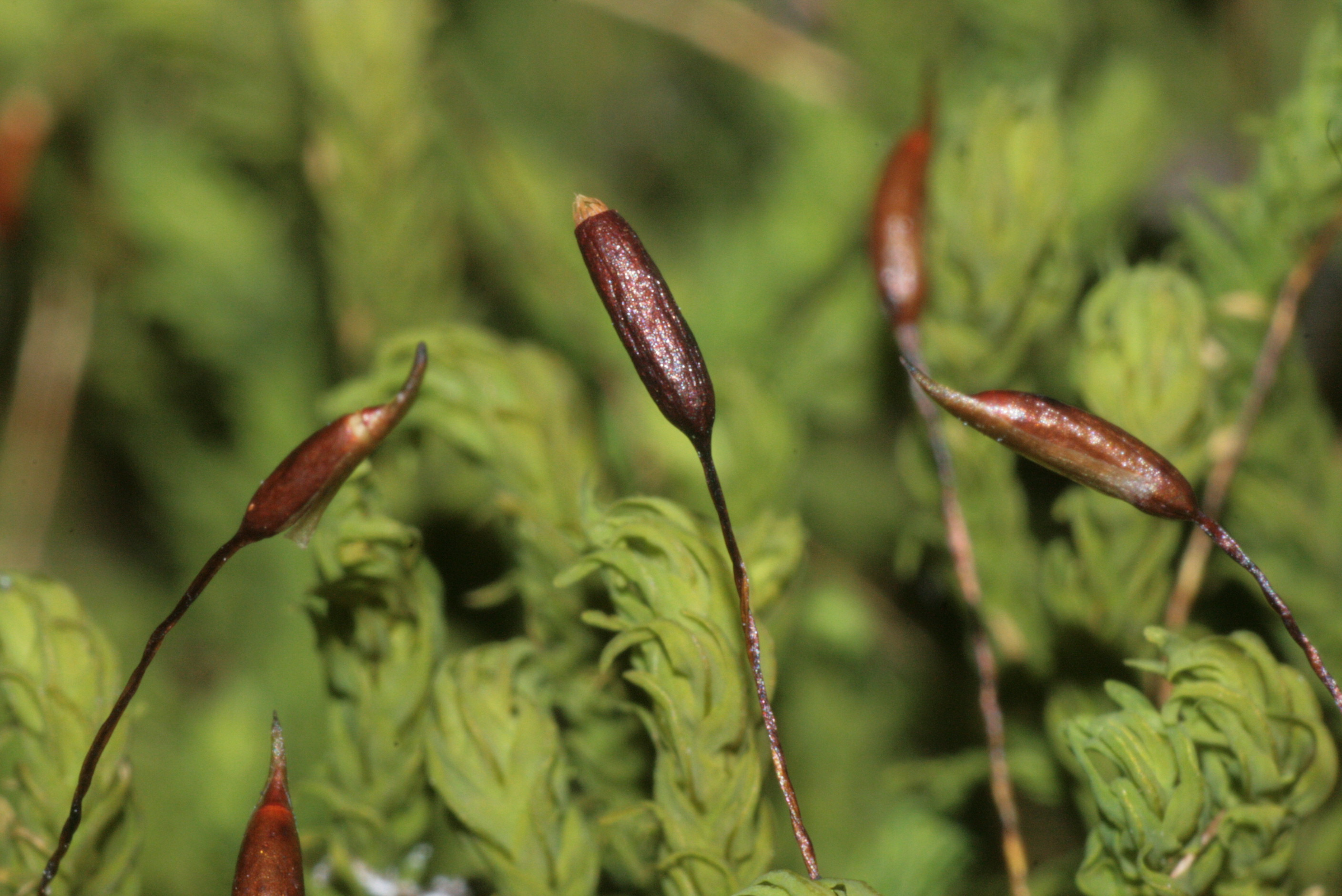
- Anomodon viticulosus

Scientific classification
- Kingdom: Plantae
- Division: Bryophyta
- Class: Bryopsida
- Subclass: Bryidae
- Order: Hypnales
- Family: Anomodontaceae
- Genus: Anomodon; Hooker & Taylor

= Anomodon (plant) =

Genus of mosses

Anomodon is a genus of mosses in the family Thuidiaceae.

== Species ==
As accepted by GBIF;

- Anomodon abbreviatus Mitten, 1891
- Anomodon acuminatus (Hook.) Fürnr.
- Anomodon acutifolius Mitt.
- Anomodon attenuatus Hübener, 1833
- Anomodon cladorrhizans (Hedw.) Fürnr.
- Anomodon clavirameus (Müll.Hal.) A.Jaeger
- Anomodon consanguineus (Mont.) A.Jaeger
- Anomodon dentatus C.Gao
- Anomodon dentatus Gao Chien, 1977
- Anomodon ferrugineus (Besch.) Nog.
- Anomodon filiformis (Hedw.) Fürnr.
- Anomodon filivagus Müll.Hal.
- Anomodon flagelliformis Granzow-de la Cerda, 1997
- Anomodon flavescens (Hook.) Fürnr.
- Anomodon giraldii C.Müller, 1896
- Anomodon giraldii Müll.Hal.
- Anomodon gracilis (Hedw.) Garov.
- Anomodon grandiretis Brotherus, 1924
- Anomodon grateloupii Mont.
- Anomodon heteroideus Kindberg, 1892
- Anomodon intricatus (Hedw.) Hampe
- Anomodon leikipiae Müll.Hal.
- Anomodon longifolius C.J.Hartman, 1838
- Anomodon longinervis Brotherus, 1899
- Anomodon longisetus (Hook.) Fürnr.
- Anomodon macrocarpus (Brid.) Fürnr.
- Anomodon mexicanus (Besch.) A.Jaeger
- Anomodon minor Lindberg, 1865
- Anomodon nervosus (Brid.) Huebener
- Anomodon obscurus (Hedw.) A.Jaeger
- Anomodon pellicula Müll.Hal.
- Anomodon pellucinervis (Mitt.) A.Jaeger
- Anomodon perlinguatus Broth. ex P.C.Wu & Y.Jia
- Anomodon perpusillus (De Not.) Garov.
- Anomodon pseudoattenuatus (Müll.Hal.) A.Jaeger
- Anomodon pseudotristis Kindberg, 1888
- Anomodon repens (Brid.) Fürnr.
- Anomodon rostratus W.P.Schimper, 1860
- Anomodon rotundatus Paris & Brotherus, 1909
- Anomodon rugelii Keissler, 1900
- Anomodon seductrix (Hedw.) Fürnr.
- Anomodon sieboldii Granzow-de la Cerda, 1997
- Anomodon solovjovii Lazarenko, 1933
- Anomodon stratosus (Mitt.) A.Jaeger
- Anomodon striatus (Schwägr.) Fürnr.
- Anomodon subrigidulus Kindb.
- Anomodon tasmanicus Broth.
- Anomodon thraustus C.Müller, 1898
- Anomodon thraustus Müll.Hal.
- Anomodon trichophyllum (Sw. ex Hedw.) Fürnr.
- Anomodon tristis Sullivant & Lesquereux, 1856
- Anomodon viticulosus W.J.Hooker & Taylor, 1818
- Anomodon zippelii (Dozy & Molk.) Müll.Hal.
