= Platynus cazieri =

Scientific classification
- Kingdom: Animalia
- Phylum: Arthropoda
- Class: Insecta
- Order: Coleoptera
- Suborder: Adephaga
- Family: Carabidae
- Tribe: Platynini
- Genus: Platynus
- Species: P. cazieri

Binomial name
- Platynus cazieri Liebherr & Will, 1996

Species of beetle

Platynus cazieri is a species of ground beetle in the family Carabidae.
