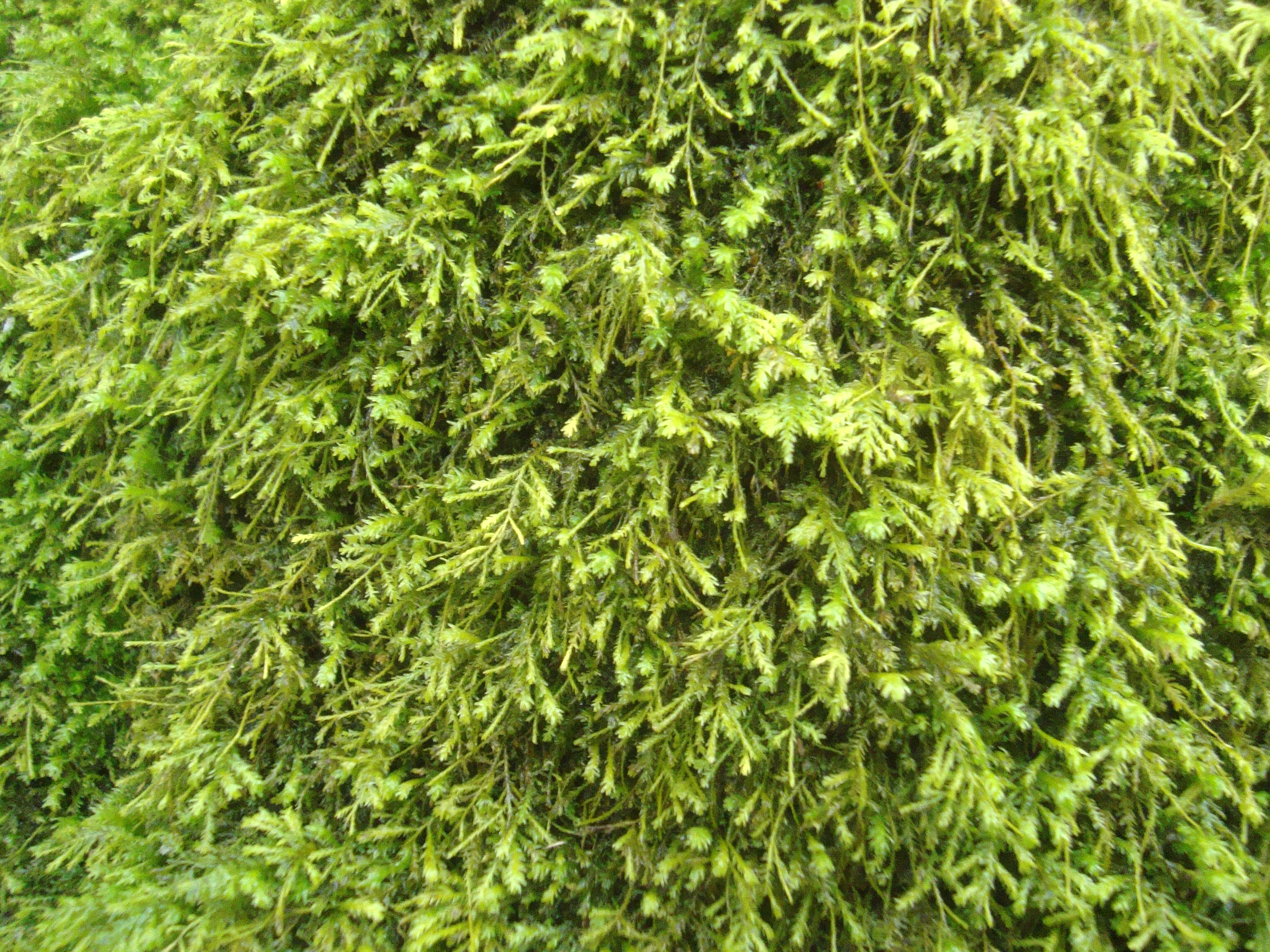

Scientific classification
- Kingdom: Plantae
- Division: Bryophyta
- Class: Bryopsida
- Subclass: Bryidae
- Order: Hypnales
- Family: Anomodontaceae
- Genus: Pseudanomodon
- Species: P. attenuatus

Binomial name
- Pseudanomodon attenuatus (Hedw.) Ignatov & Fedosov

Synonyms
- Anomodon attenuatus (Hedw.) Hüb.; Anomodon wrightii Müll. Hal.; Hypnum attenuatum (Hedw.) Sm.; Hypnum fulvum Brid.; Hypnum stoloniferum P. Beauv.; Leskea attenuata Hedw.

= Pseudanomodon attenuatus =

Species of moss

Pseudanomodon attenuatus (syn. Anomodon attenuatus), the tree-skirt moss, poodle moss, or anomodon moss, is a species of moss in the family Neckeraceae or Anomodontaceae, depending on authority. It has a wide-ranging distribution and can be found from Canada to Central America, with a particularly heavy presence in the eastern United States, and the Caribbean as well as in Europe (Commonly found in the Yorkshire Dales in the UK) and Asia (India, eastern Russia, and Turkey).
