= Platynus ovatulus =

Scientific classification
- Domain: Eukaryota
- Kingdom: Animalia
- Phylum: Arthropoda
- Class: Insecta
- Order: Coleoptera
- Suborder: Adephaga
- Family: Carabidae
- Genus: Platynus
- Species: P. ovatulus

Binomial name
- Platynus ovatulus (Bates, 1884)

Synonyms
- Agonum languidum (G.H. Horn, 1892); Anchomenus ovatulus G.H. Horn, 1892; Platynus languidus Bates, 1884

Species of beetle

Platynus ovatulus is a species of ground beetle in the family Carabidae. It is found in North America.
