= Platynus daviesi =

Scientific classification
- Domain: Eukaryota
- Kingdom: Animalia
- Phylum: Arthropoda
- Class: Insecta
- Order: Coleoptera
- Suborder: Adephaga
- Family: Carabidae
- Tribe: Platynini
- Genus: Platynus
- Species: P. daviesi

Binomial name
- Platynus daviesi Bousquet, 2012

Species of beetle

Platynus daviesi is a species of ground beetle in the family Carabidae. It is found in North America.
