= Achatella =

Scientific classification
- Domain: Eukaryota
- Kingdom: Animalia
- Phylum: Arthropoda
- Class: †Trilobita
- Order: †Phacopida
- Family: †Calmoniidae
- Genus: †Achatella; Delo, 1935

Extinct genus of trilobites

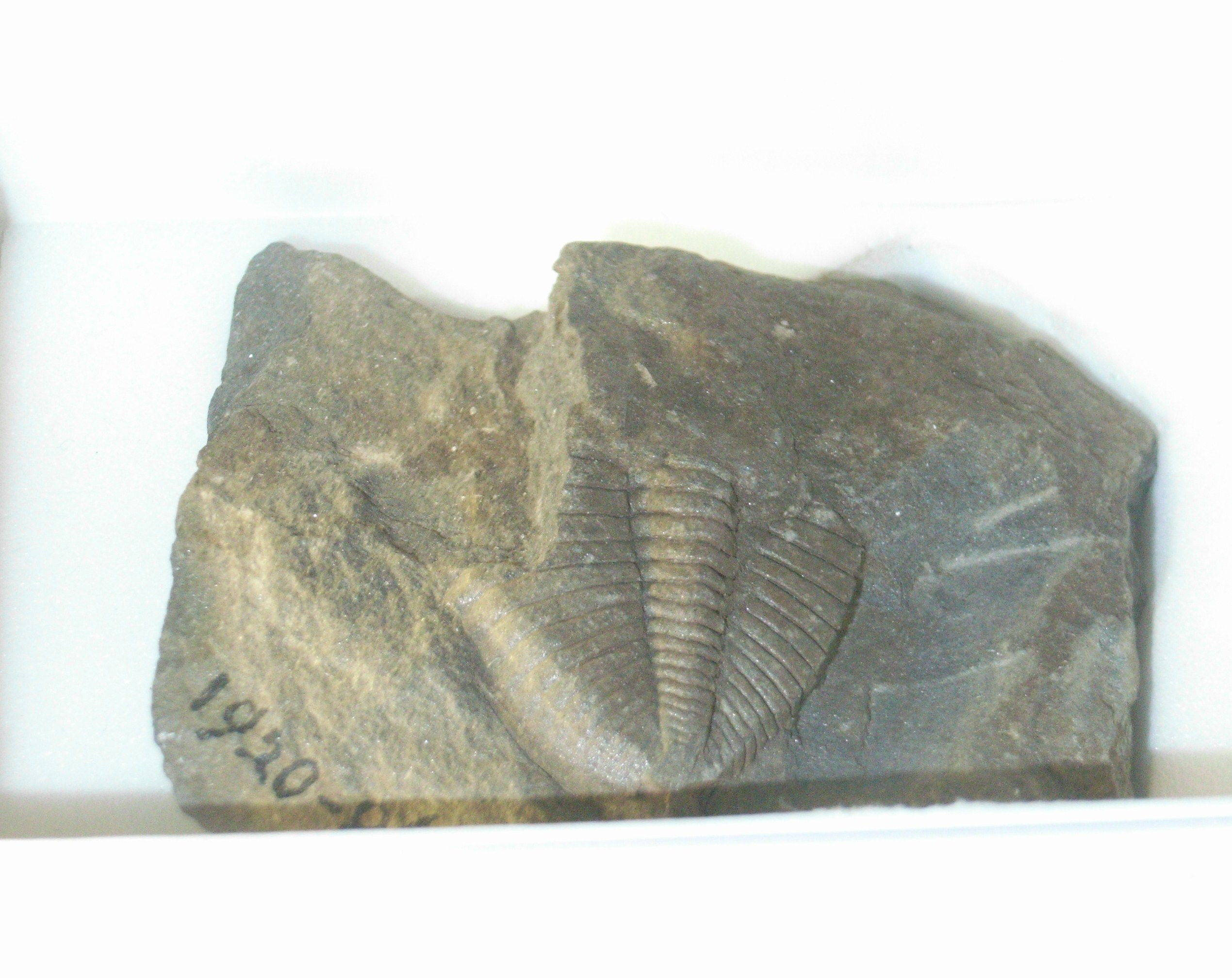
Achatella truncatocaudata

Achatella is a genus of trilobite in the order Phacopida, which existed in what is now Ontario, Canada. It was named by Delo in 1935, and the type species is Achatella achates, which was originally assigned to the genus Dalmanites by Billings in 1860. Achatella also contains the species Achatella billingsi, and Achatella truncatocaudata.
