= Paraisobuthus =

Paraisobuthus Temporal range: Upper Carboniferous

Scientific classification
- Kingdom: Animalia
- Phylum: Arthropoda
- Subphylum: Chelicerata
- Class: Arachnida
- Order: Scorpiones
- Suborder: †Lobosternina
- Superfamily: †Paraisobuthoidea
- Family: †Paraisobuthidae; Kjellesvig-Waering, 1986
- Genus: †Paraisobuthus; Kjellesvig-Waering, 1986

Type species
- †Paraisobuthus prantli Kjellesvig-Waering, 1986

Extinct genus of scorpions

Paraisobuthus is an extinct genus of scorpions from the Upper Carboniferous of Europe and North America.

== Species ==
- Paraisobuthus duobicarinatus Kjellesvig-Waering, 1986
- Paraisobuthus frici Kjellesvig-Waering, 1986
- Paraisobuthus prantli Kjellesvig-Waering, 1986
- Paraisobuthus virginiae Kjellesvig-Waering, 1986
