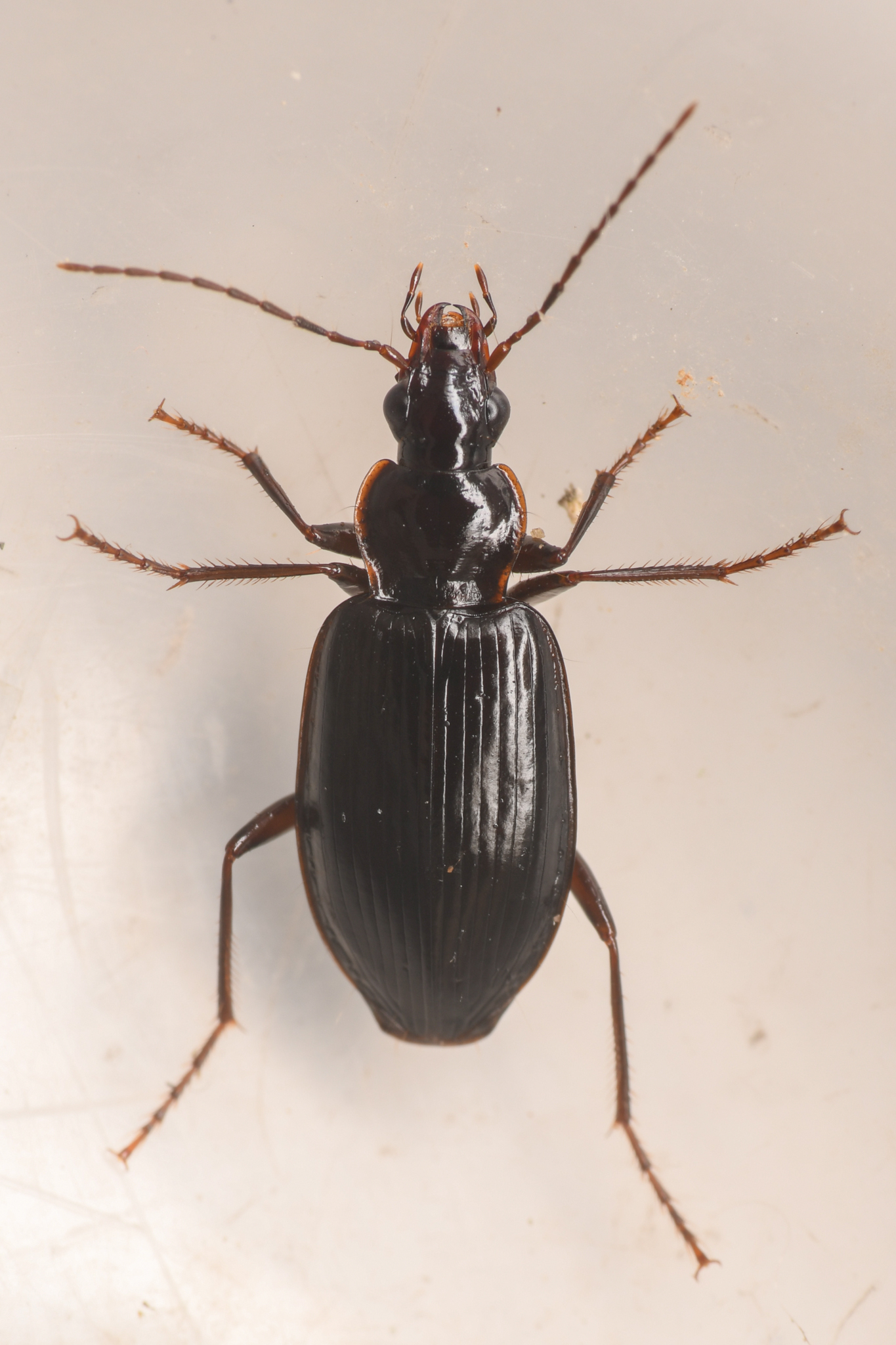

Scientific classification
- Domain: Eukaryota
- Kingdom: Animalia
- Phylum: Arthropoda
- Class: Insecta
- Order: Coleoptera
- Suborder: Adephaga
- Family: Carabidae
- Tribe: Platynini
- Genus: Platynus
- Species: P. brunneomarginatus

Binomial name
- Platynus brunneomarginatus (Mannerheim, 1843)

= Platynus brunneomarginatus =

Species of beetle

Platynus brunneomarginatus is a species of ground beetle in the family Carabidae. It is found in western North America between southern British Columbia, northern Baja California, and east to western New Mexico.
