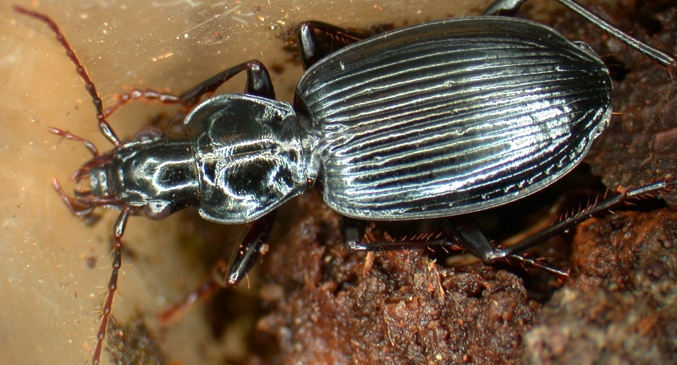

Scientific classification
- Domain: Eukaryota
- Kingdom: Animalia
- Phylum: Arthropoda
- Class: Insecta
- Order: Coleoptera
- Suborder: Adephaga
- Family: Carabidae
- Tribe: Platynini
- Genus: Platynus
- Species: P. ovipennis

Binomial name
- Platynus ovipennis (Mannerheim, 1843)

Synonyms
- Agonum ruguliferum (Casey, 1920); Agonum tersum (Casey, 1920); Anchomenus arachnoides Casey, 1920; Anchomenus maurus Motschulsky, 1845; Anchomenus ovipennis Mannerheim, 1843; Anchomenus rugulifer Casey, 1920; Anchomenus similatus Casey, 1920; Anchomenus tersus Casey, 1920

= Platynus ovipennis =

Species of beetle

Platynus ovipennis is a species of ground beetle in the family Carabidae.
