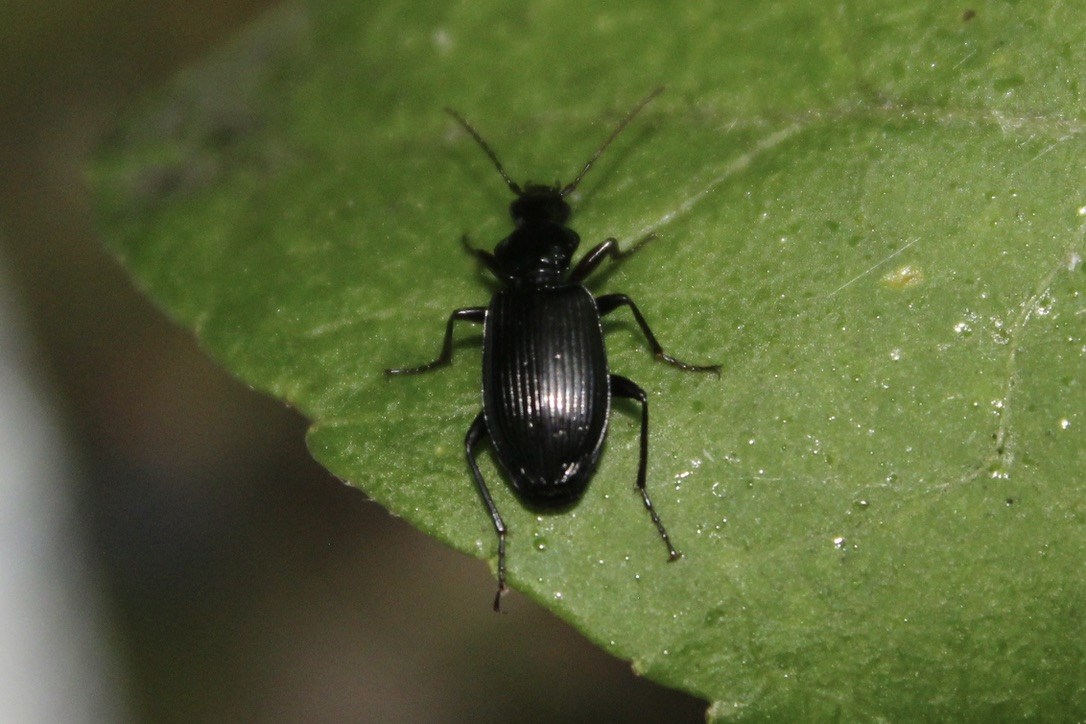

Scientific classification
- Domain: Eukaryota
- Kingdom: Animalia
- Phylum: Arthropoda
- Class: Insecta
- Order: Coleoptera
- Suborder: Adephaga
- Family: Carabidae
- Genus: Platynus
- Species: P. decentis

Binomial name
- Platynus decentis (Say, 1823)

= Platynus decentis =

Species of beetle

Platynus decentis is a species of ground beetle in the family Carabidae. It is found in North America.
