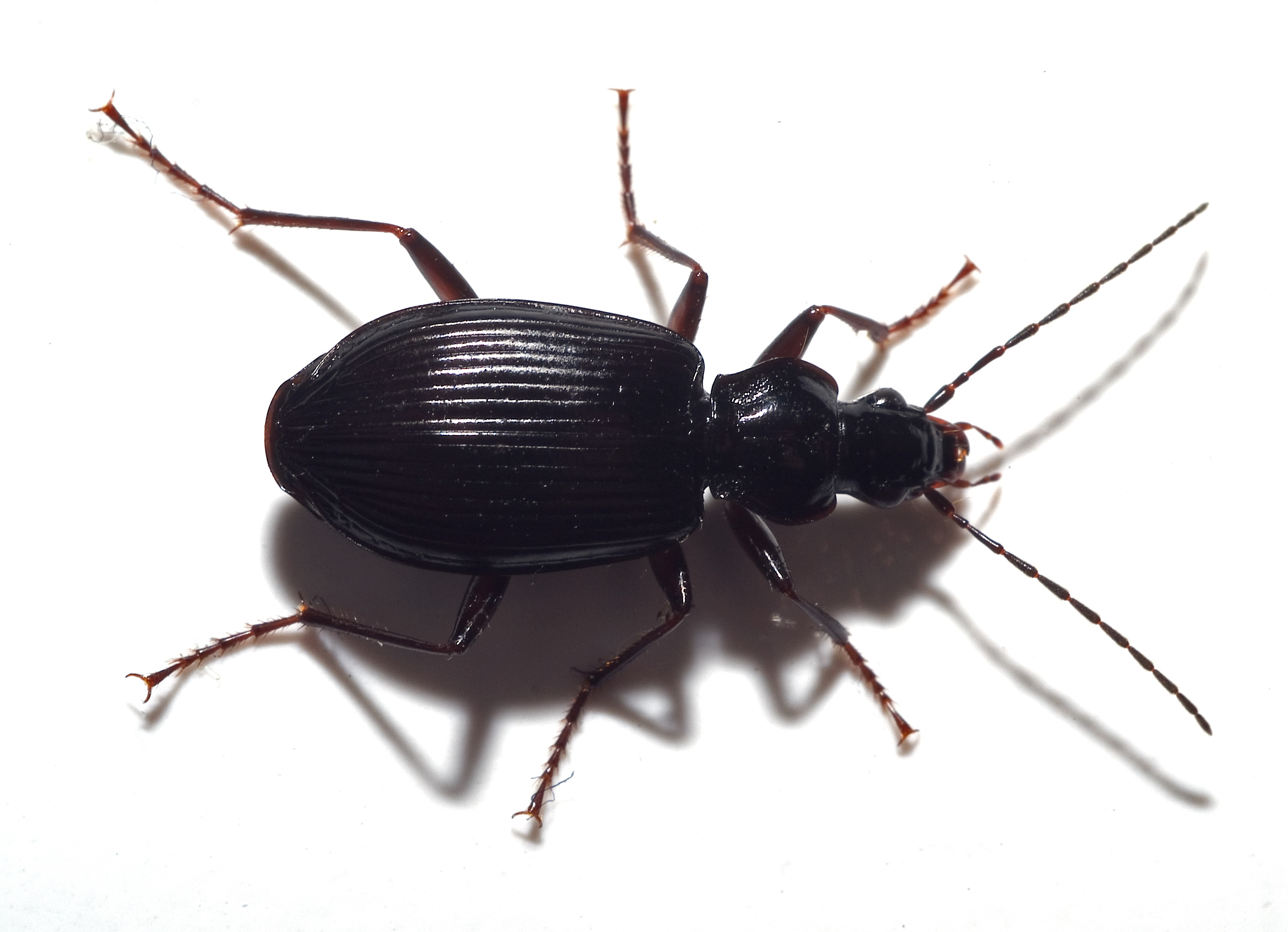

Scientific classification
- Kingdom: Animalia
- Phylum: Arthropoda
- Clade: Pancrustacea
- Class: Insecta
- Order: Coleoptera
- Suborder: Adephaga
- Family: Carabidae
- Subfamily: Platyninae
- Tribe: Platynini
- Genus: Platynus
- Species: P. assimilis

Binomial name
- Platynus assimilis (Paykull, 1790)

Synonyms
- Limodromus assimilis

= Platynus assimilis =

Species of insect

Platynus assimilis is a beetle in the taxon (sub-family) Platyninae in the family of ground beetles.

== Distribution ==
Platynus assimilis is found across Europe, although less often in the Southwest. It spreads eastwards into Asia. It is found in Norway.

== Appearance ==
Platynus assimilis is 8,7-12,3 mm long and has a black colour without metallic luster. The legs are brownish black, but not uniform in color, but have a darker part. The grooves of the cover wings are deep and clear, the third groove space (from the middle / seam) has three brush points, a recess with one stiffly rising hair. The pronotum is tapered at the very back, with a curved side edge and has sharp, almost right-angled back corners. The first joint of the hind foot is clearly longer than the groove in the tip of the calf (tibia). The antennae are brownish black, the fourth part with fine short hairs and some long bristles at the tip. The third joint is bare (naked), without the short adjacent hairs (requires magnification to view).

== Ecology ==
Platynus assimilis is fairly common, living under bark from trees, moss and withered leaves. Often found along waterways and beaches. It is usually nocturnal and lives as a predator on other animals.

Larvae live as predators, hidden in the top layer of the earth.

They belong to the group Holometabola, who undergo metamorphosis The larvae are radically different from the adults in lifestyle and in physique. Between the larval stage and the adult stage is a pupal stage, a resting period in which the internal and external organs of the beetle change.
