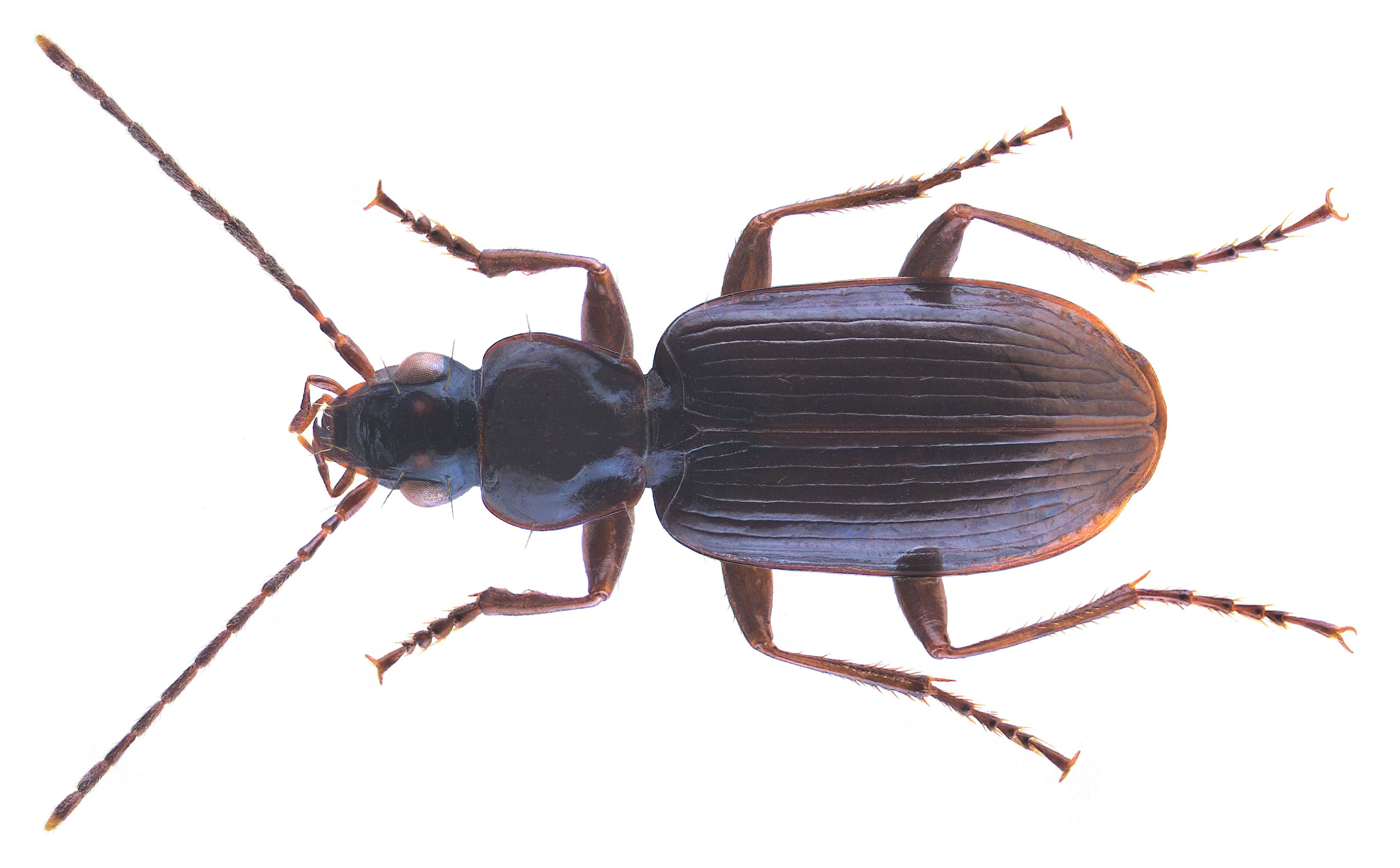

Scientific classification
- Kingdom: Animalia
- Phylum: Arthropoda
- Clade: Pancrustacea
- Class: Insecta
- Order: Coleoptera
- Suborder: Adephaga
- Family: Carabidae
- Genus: Platynus
- Species: P. livens

Binomial name
- Platynus livens (Gyllenhal, 1810)

= Platynus livens =

Species of beetle

Platynus livens is a species of ground beetle native to Europe.
