= Platynus opaculus =

Scientific classification
- Domain: Eukaryota
- Kingdom: Animalia
- Phylum: Arthropoda
- Class: Insecta
- Order: Coleoptera
- Suborder: Adephaga
- Family: Carabidae
- Tribe: Platynini
- Genus: Platynus
- Species: P. opaculus

Binomial name
- Platynus opaculus Leconte, 1863

Species of beetle

Platynus opaculus is a species of ground beetle in the family Carabidae. It is found in North America.
