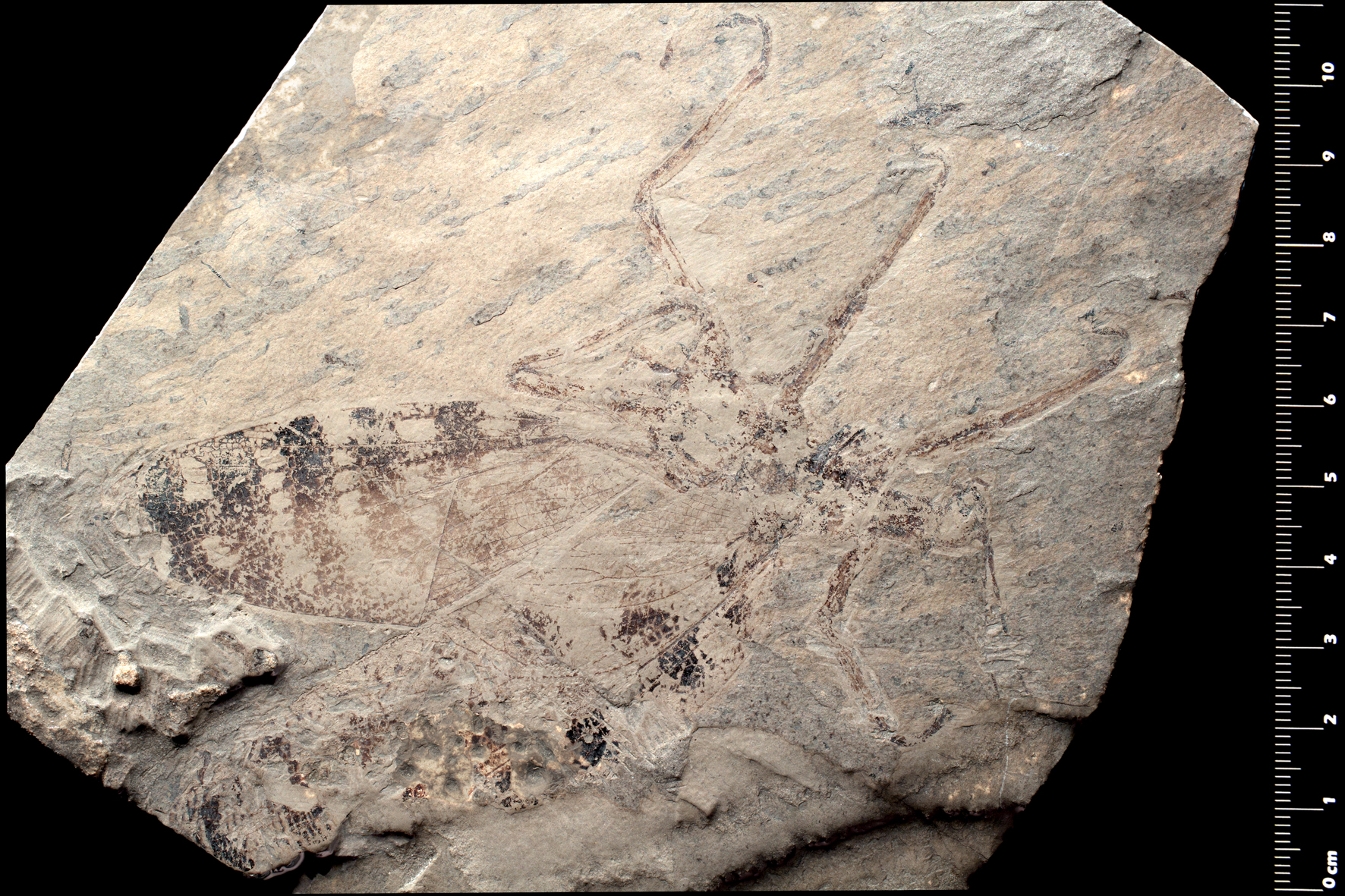
- Protophasma dumasii

Scientific classification
- Kingdom: Animalia
- Phylum: Arthropoda
- Class: Insecta
- Superorder: Orthopterida
- Order: incertae sedis
- Family: †Protophasmatidae
- Genus: †Protophasma Brongniart, 1878

Species
- †P. dumasii; †P. galtieri; †P. multidiffusa

= Protophasma =

Protophasma Temporal range: Carboniferous

Extinct genus of insects

Protophasma (meaning "first phantom") is an extinct genus of protorthopteran insect from the Carboniferous of Europe and North America.

== Description ==
Three species of Protophasma are described, type species, Protophasma dumasii (sometimes mistyped as P. dumasi) is known from Late Carboniferous (Stephanian) Coal Measures of Commentry, France. Protophasma galtieri is known from Mazon Creek fossil beds in Illinois, and Protophasma multidiffusa, originally described as Heterologellus (?) multidiffusus, is known from Germany. Previously assigned species, P. gaudryi later moved to the genus Protodiamphipnoa, and P. woodwardi moved into genus Cnemidolestes.

P. dumasii have forewings with morphology that allows the assignment of Archaeorthoptera, but hindwings have morphological similarity to Blattodea.

== Sources ==
- Grimaldi, David; Engel, Michael S. (2005). Evolution of the Insects. Cambridge University Press. ISBN 0-521-82149-5.
