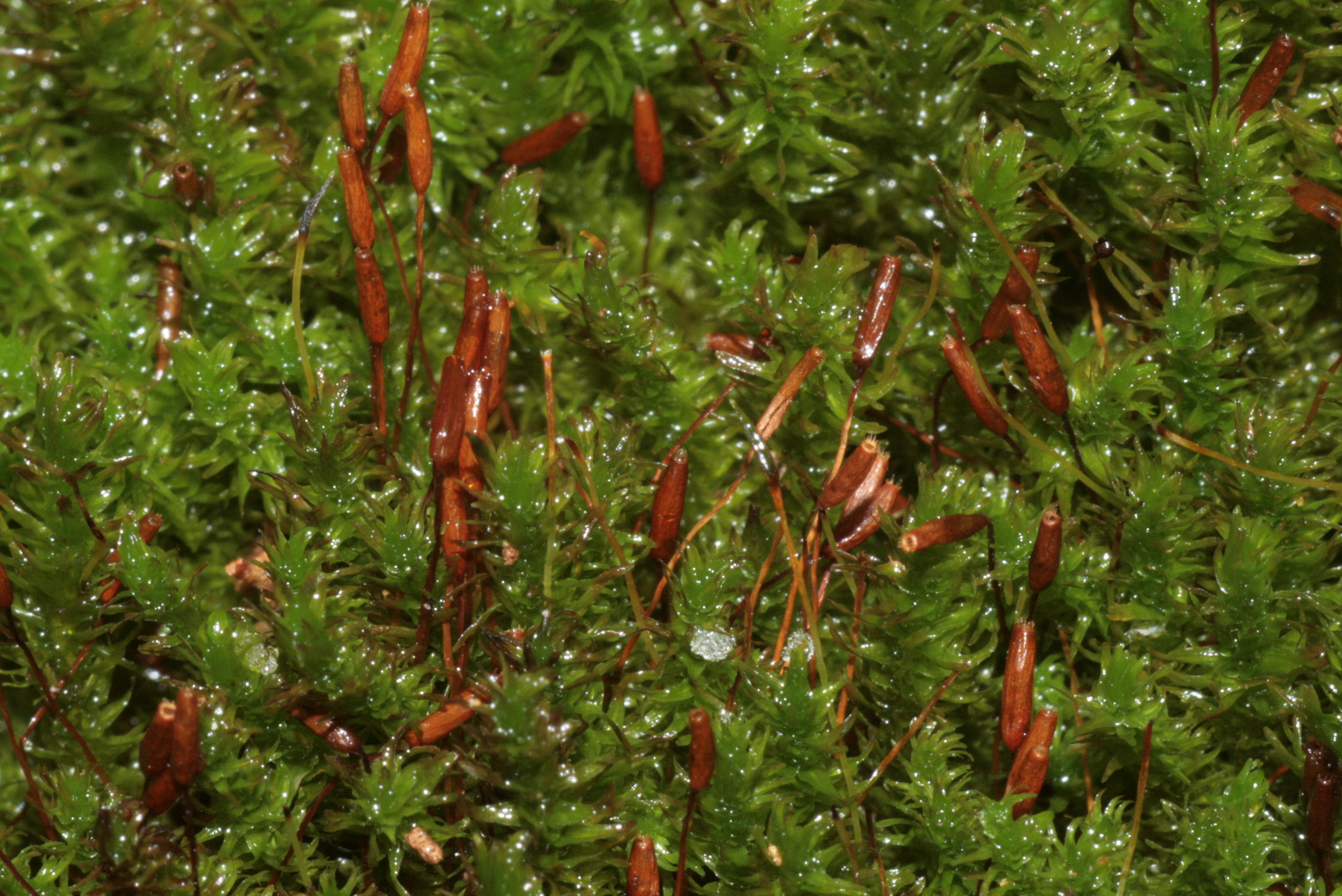
- Anomodon viticulosus

Scientific classification
- Kingdom: Plantae
- Division: Bryophyta
- Class: Bryopsida
- Subclass: Bryidae
- Order: Hypnales
- Family: Anomodontaceae; Kindb.

= Anomodontaceae =

Family of mosses

Anomodontaceae is a family of mosses belonging to the order Hypnales.

Genera:

- Anomodon Hook. & Taylor
- Anomodontella Ignatov & Fedosov
- Anomodontopsis Ignatov & Fedosov
- Bryonorrisia L.R.Stark & W.R.Buck
- Curviramea H.A.Crum
- Haplohymenium Dozy & Molk.
