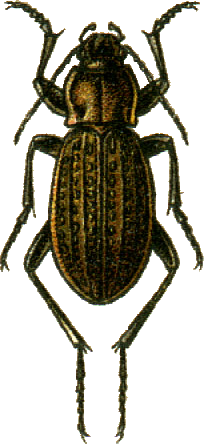

Scientific classification
- Domain: Eukaryota
- Kingdom: Animalia
- Phylum: Arthropoda
- Class: Insecta
- Order: Coleoptera
- Suborder: Adephaga
- Family: Carabidae
- Genus: Carabus
- Species: C. maeander

Binomial name
- Carabus maeander Fischer von Waldheim, 1820

Synonyms
- Hemicarabus quelpartensis Kwon & Lee, 1984; Carabus atlanticus Lapouge, 1925; Carabus mongolicus Lapouge, 1905; Carabus lecontei Géhin, 1885; Carabus obscuratus Géhin, 1885; Carabus excatenatus Kraatz, 1880; Carabus excostatus Kraatz, 1880; Carabus simoni Heyden, 1879; Carabus hudsonicus Motschulsky, 1866; Carabus lapilayi Laporte, 1834; Carabus ehrenbergi Fischer von Waldheim, 1829; Carabus incompletus Fischer von Waldheim, 1828; Homoeocarabus nobukii Imura, 2003; Carabus nemorensis Lapouge, 1925; Carabus fureioiensis Kano, 1922; Carabus batesi Lapouge, 1916; Carabus palustris Dejean, 1829

= Carabus maeander =

Species of beetle

Carabus maeander, the menderes worm and slug hunter, is a species of beetle in the family Carabidae. The species fly in May and June, are black in colour and 15 to 23.5 millimetres (0.59 to 0.93 in) long. It is found in northeastern United States and both central and southern Canada (including Alberta). The species is also found outside of North America. In Russia, it is found in eastern Siberia while in Japan it is known from Hokkaido and Kunashir Islands. It also exists in South Korea.

== Subspecies ==
These subspecies belong to the species Carabus maeander:

- Carabus maeander chejuensis Deuve, 1991 (South Korea)
- Carabus maeander evenkiensis (Russia)
- Carabus maeander lapilayi Castelnau, 1835
- Carabus maeander maeander Fischer von Waldheim, 1820 (China, North Korea, South Korea, USA, Canada, Russia, Mongolia, Alaska)
- Carabus maeander nobukii (Imura, 2003) (Japan)
- Carabus maeander paludis Géhin, 1885 (China, Japan, Russia)
- †Carabus maeander sangamon Wickham, 1917 (described from Sangamon Peat, Champaign Co.)
