= Platynus cohni =

Scientific classification
- Kingdom: Animalia
- Phylum: Arthropoda
- Class: Insecta
- Order: Coleoptera
- Suborder: Adephaga
- Family: Carabidae
- Tribe: Platynini
- Genus: Platynus
- Species: P. cohni

Binomial name
- Platynus cohni Liebherr & Will, 1996

Species of beetle

Platynus cohni is a species of ground beetle in the family Carabidae. It is found in North America.
