= Platynus tenuicollis =

Scientific classification
- Kingdom: Animalia
- Phylum: Arthropoda
- Class: Insecta
- Order: Coleoptera
- Suborder: Adephaga
- Family: Carabidae
- Genus: Platynus
- Species: P. tenuicollis

Binomial name
- Platynus tenuicollis (LeConte, 1846)

Synonyms
- Agonum acuticolle (Motschulsky, 1865); Limodromus acuticollis Motschulsky, 1865

Species of beetle

Platynus tenuicollis is a species of ground beetle in the family Carabidae. It is found in North America.
