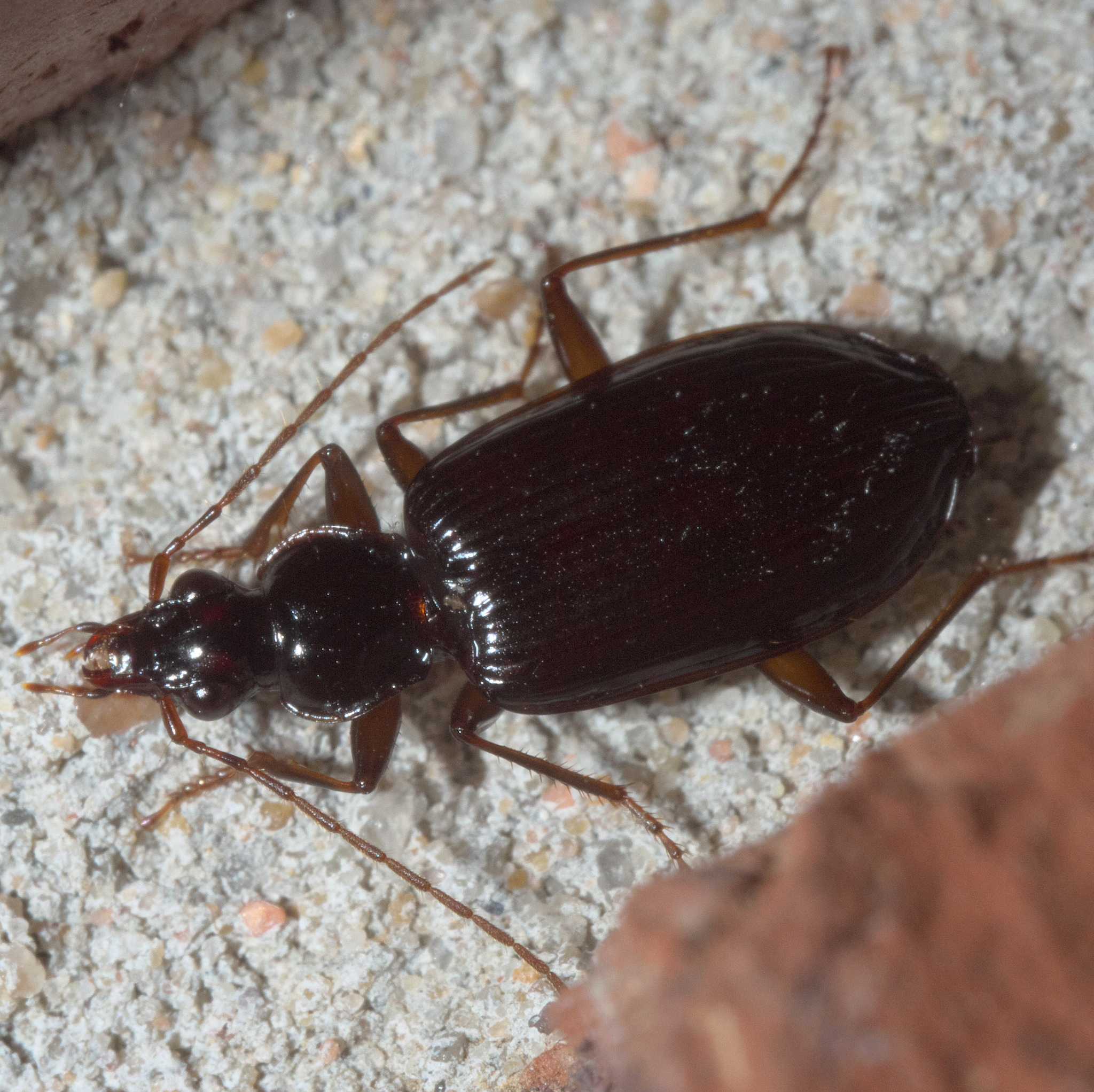
- Platynus cincticollis, Oklahoma

Scientific classification
- Domain: Eukaryota
- Kingdom: Animalia
- Phylum: Arthropoda
- Class: Insecta
- Order: Coleoptera
- Suborder: Adephaga
- Family: Carabidae
- Subfamily: Platyninae
- Tribe: Platynini
- Genus: Platynus
- Species: P. cincticollis

Binomial name
- Platynus cincticollis (Say, 1823)

= Platynus cincticollis =

Species of beetle

Platynus cincticollis is a species of ground beetle in the family Carabidae. It has two reddish spots on the head, and is found in North America.
