= Platynus parmarginatus =

Scientific classification
- Domain: Eukaryota
- Kingdom: Animalia
- Phylum: Arthropoda
- Class: Insecta
- Order: Coleoptera
- Suborder: Adephaga
- Family: Carabidae
- Genus: Platynus
- Species: P. parmarginatus

Binomial name
- Platynus parmarginatus Hamilton, 1893

Species of beetle

Platynus parmarginatus is a species of ground beetles in the family Carabidae. It is found in North America.
