= Platynus trifoveolatus =

Scientific classification
- Domain: Eukaryota
- Kingdom: Animalia
- Phylum: Arthropoda
- Class: Insecta
- Order: Coleoptera
- Suborder: Adephaga
- Family: Carabidae
- Tribe: Platynini
- Genus: Platynus
- Species: P. trifoveolatus

Binomial name
- Platynus trifoveolatus Beutenmüller, 1903

Species of beetle

Platynus trifoveolatus is a species of ground beetle in the family Carabidae. It is found in North America.
