= Platynus lyratus =

Scientific classification
- Domain: Eukaryota
- Kingdom: Animalia
- Phylum: Arthropoda
- Class: Insecta
- Order: Coleoptera
- Suborder: Adephaga
- Family: Carabidae
- Tribe: Platynini
- Genus: Platynus
- Species: P. lyratus

Binomial name
- Platynus lyratus (Chaudoir, 1879)

Species of beetle

Platynus lyratus is a species of ground beetle in the family Carabidae. It is found in North America.
