= Anomodon snyderi =

Anomodon snyderi Temporal range: Quaternary, 2.58–0.012 Ma

Scientific classification
- Domain: Eukaryota
- Kingdom: Animalia
- Phylum: Chordata
- Class: Mammalia
- Order: Eulipotyphla
- Family: Talpidae
- Genus: Anomodon
- Species: A. snyderi

Binomial name
- Anomodon snyderi LeConte, 1848

Extinct species of mammal

Anomodon is an extinct genus of talpid mole from Galena, Illinois. The type, and only species, A. snyderi, was named and described in 1848 by John Lawrence LeConte. The type specimen is ANSP 11631, a canine tooth, of which the genus is based on.
