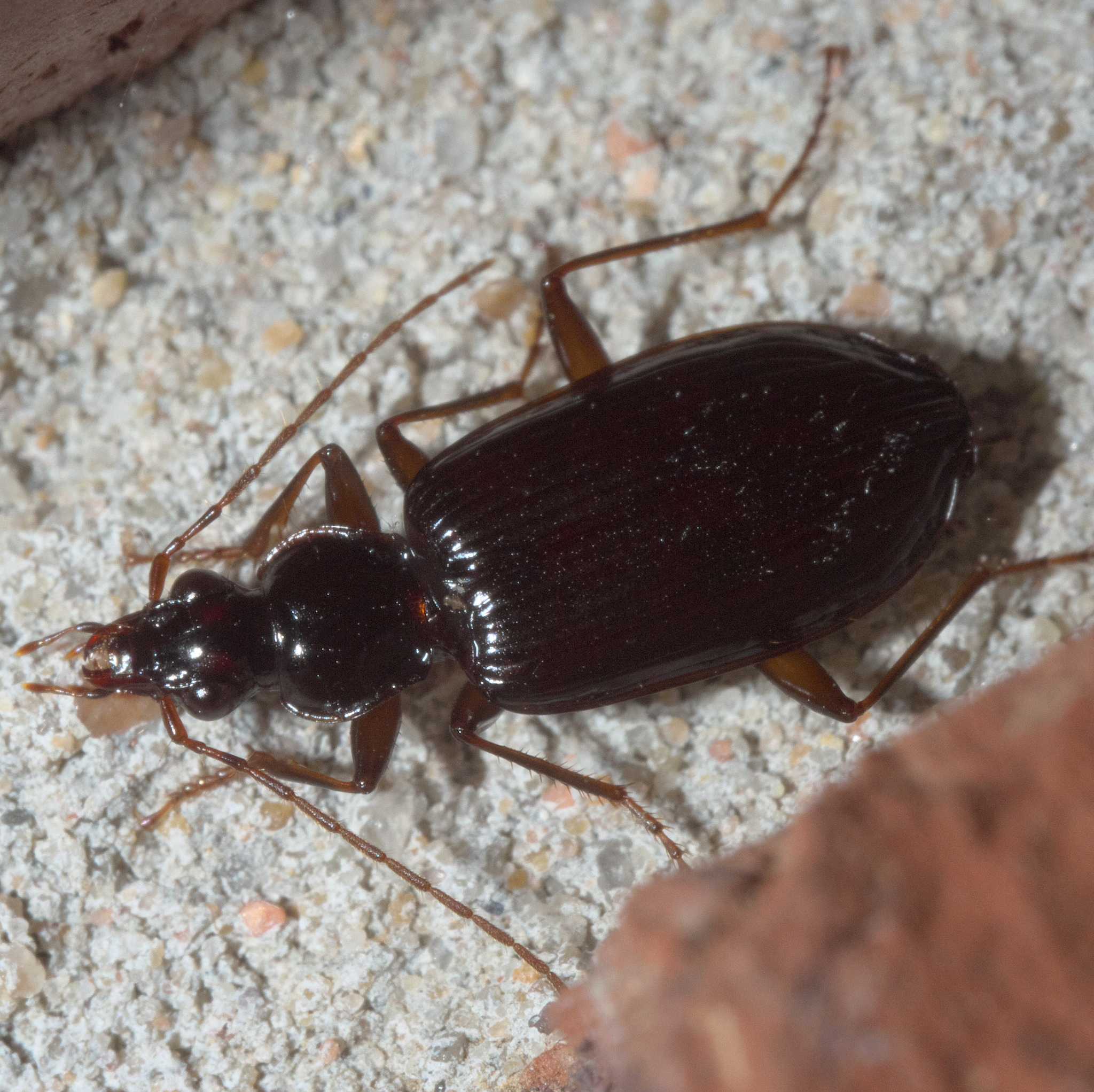
- Platynus cincticollis, Oklahoma

Scientific classification
- Kingdom: Animalia
- Phylum: Arthropoda
- Class: Insecta
- Order: Coleoptera
- Suborder: Adephaga
- Family: Carabidae
- Subfamily: Platyninae
- Tribe: Platynini
- Genus: Platynus; Bonelli, 1810

Subgenera
- Batenus Motschulsky, 1865; Microplatynus Barr, 1982; Platynella Casey, 1920; Platynus; Stenoplatynus Casey, 1920; Trapezodera Casey, 1920

Diversity
- at least 160 species

= Platynus =

Genus of beetles

Platynus is a genus of ground beetles in the family Carabidae. There are more than 180 described species in Platynus.

== Species ==
These 183 species belong to the genus Platynus.

- Platynus acuniai (Darlington, 1937) (Cuba)
- Platynus aeneicauda (Bates, 1891) (Mexico)
- Platynus aeneosetosus Liebherr, 1989 (Panama)
- Platynus agilis LeConte, 1863 (North America)
- Platynus aguadensis (Perrault, 1991) (Venezuela)
- Platynus algirinus (Buquet, 1840) (Algeria)
- Platynus altifluminis (Darlington, 1936) (Hispaniola)
- Platynus amone (Darlington, 1936) (Hispaniola)
- Platynus anatolicus J.Schmidt, 1996 (Turkey)
- Platynus andrewesi (Morvan, 1996) (India)
- Platynus angustatus Dejean, 1828 (North America)
- Platynus arboreus (Mateu, 1978) (Mexico)
- Platynus asper Jedlicka, 1936 (China)
- Platynus assimilis (Paykull, 1790) ((former) (Palearctic)
- Platynus azbleotroades (Morvan, 1996) (India)
- Platynus ballorum Liebherr, 1992 (Mexico)
- Platynus banaticus (I.Frivaldszky von Frivald, 1865) (Romania)
- Platynus baragua (Darlington, 1936) (Cuba)
- Platynus barclayi J.Schmidt, 2009 (Pakistan)
- Platynus baroni (Casey, 1920) (Mexico)
- Platynus batesi (Morvan, 2004) (India)
- Platynus benardi (Andrewes, 1924) (India)
- Platynus biramosus (Darlington, 1939) (Hispaniola)
- Platynus bromeliarum (Darlington, 1937) (the Lesser Antilles)
- Platynus bruesi (Darlington, 1936) (the Lesser Antilles)
- Platynus bruneri (Darlington, 1937) (Cuba)
- Platynus brunneomarginatus (Mannerheim, 1843) (North America)
- Platynus bruskelchus (Morvan, 1996) (India)
- Platynus bucheri (Darlington, 1937) (Cuba)
- Platynus calathinus (Darlington, 1939) (Hispaniola)
- Platynus carabiai (Darlington, 1937) (Cuba)
- Platynus cavatus (Bates, 1882) (Mexico)
- Platynus cavicola (Darlington, 1964) (the Lesser Antilles)
- Platynus christophe (Darlington, 1936) (Hispaniola)
- Platynus cinchonae (Darlington, 1934) (the Lesser Antilles)
- Platynus cincticollis (Say, 1823) (North America)
- Platynus cohni Liebherr & Will, 1996 (North America)
- Platynus complanatus Dejean, 1828 (Europe)
- Platynus conicicollis (Chaudoir, 1879) (Mexico)
- Platynus constricticeps (Darlington, 1936) (Hispaniola)
- Platynus consularis (Casey, 1920) (Mexico)
- Platynus convexulus (Casey, 1920) (Mexico)
- Platynus cubensis (Darlington, 1937) (Cuba)
- Platynus cyanodorsalis Liebherr, 1989 (Panama)
- Platynus cychrinus (Darlington, 1936) (Hispaniola)
- Platynus darlingtoni (Emden, 1949) (the Lesser Antilles)
- Platynus daviesi Bousquet, 2012 (North America)
- Platynus decentis (Say, 1823) (North America)
- Platynus depressus Dejean, 1831 (Europe)
- Platynus deuvei (Morvan, 1996) (India)
- Platynus dianus (Jedlicka, 1934) (Philippines)
- Platynus dilatipes Liebherr, 1989 (Mexico)
- Platynus districtus (Casey, 1920) (Mexico)
- Platynus elongatulus Fischer von Waldheim, 1829
- Platynus eulabes (Bates, 1889) (India)
- Platynus eupunctatus Liebherr, 1987 (the Lesser Antilles)
- Platynus faber (Darlington, 1936) (the Lesser Antilles)
- Platynus ferghanicus (Belousov, 1991) (Kyrgyzstan and Uzbekistan)
- Platynus fractilateralis Liebherr, 1987 (Hispaniola)
- Platynus fractilinea (Darlington, 1934) (Hispaniola)
- Platynus franiai Liebherr, 1992 (Mexico)
- Platynus fratrorum (Darlington, 1937) (Cuba)
- Platynus glacialis (Reitter, 1877) (Romania and Ukraine)
- Platynus grandicollis (Motschulsky, 1850) (Russia)
- Platynus grassator (Andrewes, 1932) (India)
- Platynus haemorrhous (Perty, 1830) (Brazil)
- Platynus hamatus Liebherr, 1989 (Mexico)
- Platynus henvelus (Morvan, 1996) (India)
- Platynus herculeanus Liebherr & Godwin, 2004
- Platynus hypolithos (Say, 1823) (North America)
- Platynus immarginatus J.Schmidt, 2009 (Nepal)
- Platynus incisus (Andrewes, 1927) (India)
- Platynus indecentis Liebherr & Will, 1996 (North America)
- Platynus inops (Chaudoir, 1879) (Belize, Guatemala, and Mexico)
- Platynus isthmiacus (Motschulsky, 1866) (Panama)
- Platynus jaegeri (Dejean, 1831) (Hispaniola)
- Platynus jamaicae (Darlington, 1953)
- Platynus kazuyoshii Morita & Kurosa, 1994 (Japan)
- Platynus klausnitzeri (J.Schmidt, 2005) (Vietnam)
- Platynus kleebergi J.Schmidt, 2009 (Nepal)
- Platynus klickai Jedlicka, 1931 (China)
- Platynus krynickii (Sperk, 1835) (Europe)
- Platynus kucerai (Morvan, 2004) (India)
- Platynus laeviceps (Darlington, 1939) (Hispaniola)
- Platynus leiroides (Perrault, 1991) (Venezuela)
- Platynus lewisi (Darlington, 1953)
- Platynus lindrothi Baehr, 1982 (North America and France)
- Platynus lineopunctatus Liebherr, 1989 (Guatemala)
- Platynus livens (Gyllenhal, 1810) (Europe)
- Platynus logicus (Casey, 1920) (Mexico)
- Platynus longiventris Mannerheim, 1825 (Europe)
- Platynus lyratus (Chaudoir, 1879) (North America)
- Platynus macer (Darlington, 1934) (the Lesser Antilles)
- Platynus macropterus (Chaudoir, 1879) (New Zealand)
- Platynus magnus (Bates, 1873) (temperate Asia)
- Platynus mannerheimii (Dejean, 1828) (Holarctic)
- Platynus marcus (Darlington, 1936) (Hispaniola)
- Platynus mediopterus (Darlington, 1937) (Cuba)
- Platynus medius (Darlington, 1937) (Cuba)
- Platynus meurguesae (Morvan, 1996) (India)
- Platynus meurguesianus (Morvan, 1996) (Afghanistan)
- Platynus montezumae (Bates, 1878) (Mexico)
- Platynus nuceus (Fairmaire, 1887) (China)
- Platynus opaculus LeConte, 1863 (North America)
- Platynus ovipennis (Mannerheim, 1843) (North America)
- Platynus pakistanensis (Morvan, 1996) (Afghanistan, India, and Pakistan)
- Platynus panamensis (Casey, 1920) (Panama)
- Platynus parallelosomus Liebherr, 1987 (the Lesser Antilles)
- Platynus parmarginatus Hamilton, 1893 (North America)
- Platynus pecki Barr, 1982 (North America)
- Platynus peirolerii Bassi, 1834 (France and Italy)
- Platynus pinarensis (Darlington, 1937) (Cuba)
- Platynus platynidioides (Perrault, 1991) (Venezuela)
- Platynus praedator (Andrewes, 1930) (Bhutan, China, India, and Nepal)
- Platynus prognathus Van Dyke, 1926 (North America)
- Platynus protensus (A.Morawitz, 1863) (East Asia)
- Platynus proximus (J.Frivaldszky, 1879) (Bulgaria)
- Platynus punctus (Darlington, 1936) (the Lesser Antilles)
- Platynus pygmaeus Liebherr, 1992 (Mexico)
- Platynus ramoni (Darlington, 1939) (Hispaniola)
- Platynus rarus J.Schmidt, 2009 (India)
- Platynus rastafarius Liebherr, 1987 (the Lesser Antilles)
- Platynus richteri (Morvan, 1996) (Pakistan)
- Platynus robustus (Chaudoir, 1878) (Mexico)
- Platynus rougemonti (Morvan, 1996) (Nepal)
- Platynus roysi (Darlington, 1937) (the Lesser Antilles)
- Platynus rubrofemoratus Liebherr, 1989 (Mexico)
- Platynus santarosae (Perrault, 1991) (Venezuela)
- Platynus satsunanus Habu, 1974 (Japan)
- Platynus schnitteri J.Schmidt, 2009 (Turkey)
- Platynus scriptellus (Darlington, 1939) (Hispaniola)
- Platynus scriptus (Darlington, 1939) (Hispaniola)
- Platynus scrobiculatus (Fabricius, 1801) (Europe)
- Platynus sexualis K. & J.Daniel, 1898 (France and Italy)
- Platynus staveni J.Schmidt, 2009 (Pakistan)
- Platynus stricticollis (Bates, 1878) (Mexico, Central and South America)
- Platynus strictinotum Liebherr, 1989 (Guatemala)
- Platynus subangustus (Darlington, 1937) (Cuba)
- Platynus subcordens (Darlington, 1936) (Hispaniola)
- Platynus subovalis (Darlington, 1936) (the Lesser Antilles)
- Platynus subovatus (Putzeys, 1875) (Japan)
- Platynus takabai (Habu, 1962) (Japan)
- Platynus tasmantus (Morvan, 1996) (Japan)
- Platynus tenuicollis (LeConte, 1846) (North America)
- Platynus teriolensis K. & J.Daniel, 1898 (Italy)
- Platynus tipoto (Darlington, 1936) (Hispaniola)
- Platynus tolucensis (Straneo, 1957) (Mexico)
- Platynus transcibao (Darlington, 1939) (Hispaniola)
- Platynus trifoveolatus Beutenmüller, 1903 (North America)
- Platynus trisetosus (Landin, 1955) (Myanmar)
- Platynus tropicus (Motschulsky, 1865) (Guatemala and Mexico)
- Platynus turberensis (Perrault, 1991) (Venezuela)
- Platynus turcicus Apfelbeck, 1904 (Bosnia-Herzegovina)
- Platynus turquinensis (Darlington, 1937) (Cuba)
- Platynus umbripennis (Casey, 1920) (Mexico)
- Platynus ustus (Andrewes, 1927) (India)
- Platynus vagepunctatus (Darlington, 1934) (the Lesser Antilles)
- Platynus viator (Andrewes, 1931) (India)
- Platynus visitor (Darlington, 1936) (Hispaniola)
- Platynus willbergi Reitter, 1891 (Kazakhstan, Kyrgyzstan, and Uzbekistan)
- Platynus wolla (Darlington, 1936) (Hispaniola)
- Platynus zengae (Morvan & Tian, 2003) (China)
- † Platynus caesus Scudder, 1890
- † Platynus calvini Wickham, 1917
- † Platynus casus Scudder, 1890
- † Platynus desuetus Scudder, 1890
- † Platynus dilapidatus Scudder, 1895
- † Platynus dissipatus Scudder, 1890
- † Platynus emetikos (Gamboa & Ortuño, 2017)
- † Platynus exterminatus Scudder, 1900
- † Platynus florissantensis Wickham, 1913
- † Platynus halli Scudder, 1890
- † Platynus harttii Scudder, 1890
- † Platynus hindei Scudder, 1890
- † Platynus hoffeinsorum (J.Schmidt, 2015)
- † Platynus insculptipennis Wickham, 1917
- † Platynus interglacialis Scudder, 1900
- † Platynus interitus Scudder, 1900
- † Platynus longaevus Scudder, 1900
- † Platynus pleistocenicus Wickham, 1917
- † Platynus senex Scudder, 1878
- † Platynus subgelidus Wickham, 1917
- † Platynus tartareus Scudder, 1900
