= 2018 in amphibian paleontology =

This list of fossil amphibians described in 2018 is a list of new taxa of fossil amphibians that were described during the year 2018, as well as other significant discoveries and events related to amphibian paleontology that occurred in 2018.

== New taxa ==
Name	Novelty	Status	Authors	Age	Type locality	Country	Notes	Images
Andersonerpeton	Gen. et comb. nov	Valid	Pardo & Mann	Carboniferous (Bashkirian)	Joggins Formation	Canada (Nova Scotia)	A member of Aistopoda. The type species is "Hylerpeton" longidentatum Dawson (1876).	
Electrorana	Gen. et sp. nov	Valid	Xing et al.	Late Cretaceous (Cenomanian)	Burmese amber	Myanmar	A frog of uncertain phylogenetic placement, possibly a member of Alytoidea. The type species is E. limoae.	
Enosuchus alveolatus	Sp. nov	Valid	Bulanov & Golubev	Late Permian		Russia (Mari El)		
Kitiakia	Gen. et sp. nov	Valid	Bulanov & Golubev	Middle Permian	Belebei Formation	Russia (Kirov Oblast)	A relative of Enosuchus. Genus includes new species K. firma.	
Kulgeriherpeton	Gen. et sp. nov	Valid	Skutschas et al.	Early Cretaceous (Berriasian–Barremian)	Batylykh Formation	Russia	A stem-salamander. The type species is K. ultimus.	
Laosuchus	Gen. et sp. nov	Valid	Arbez, Sidor & Steyer	Permian–Triassic boundary	Luang Prabang Basin	Laos	A chroniosuchian. Genus includes new species L. naga.	
Latonia caucasica	Sp. nov	Valid	Syromyatnikova & Roček	Late Miocene (early Turolian)		Russia (Adygea)	A species of Latonia.	
Mengbatrachus	Gen. et sp. nov	Valid	Tan et al.	Early Cretaceous	Longjiang Formation	China	An early anuran. The type species is M. moqi.	
Mesanerpeton	Gen. et sp. nov	Valid	Smithson & Clack	Carboniferous (Tournaisian)	Ballagan Formation	United Kingdom	An early tetrapod. The type species is M. woodi.	
Mioproteus gardneri	Sp. nov	Valid	Venczel & Codrea	Early Oligocene		Romania	A member of the family Proteidae.	
Nooxobeia	Gen. et sp. nov	Valid	Gee, Scott & Reisz	Permian (Guadalupian?)		United States (Oklahoma)	A dissorophid temnospondyl. The type species is N. gracilis.	
Shirerpeton	Gen. et sp. nov	Valid	Matsumoto & Evans	Early Cretaceous (Barremian)	Kuwajima Formation	Japan	A member of the family Albanerpetontidae. The type species is S. isajii.	
Tantallognathus	Gen. et sp. nov	Valid	Chen et al.	Carboniferous (late Tournaisian or earliest Viséan)	Ballagan Formation	United Kingdom	An early tetrapod of uncertain phylogenetic placement. The type species is T. woodi.	
Tutusius	Gen. et sp. nov	Valid	Gess & Ahlberg	Devonian (late Famennian)	Witpoort Formation	South Africa	An early tetrapod. The type species is T. umlambo.	
Umzantsia	Gen. et sp. nov	Valid	Gess & Ahlberg	Devonian (late Famennian)	Witpoort Formation	South Africa	An early tetrapod. The type species is U. amazana.	

== General research ==
- Evidence from multi-stable isotope data indicating that some Devonian vertebrates, including early tetrapods, were euryhaline and inhabited aquatic environments subject to rapid changes in salinity is presented by Goedert et al. (2018).
- A study on the evolution of hindlimb musculature from the lobe-finned fishes to early tetrapods is published online by Molnar et al. (2018).
- A partial jaw resembling that of Crassigyrinus is described from the Tournaisian of Scotland by Clack, Porro & Bennett (2018), potentially extending the existence of the genus by approximately 20 million years towards the base of the Carboniferous.
- A study on the fossil record of amphibians, aiming to identify traits that influenced the extinction risk of species, and using this data to predict the extinction risk for living amphibian species, is published by Tietje & Rödel (2018).
- Description of anamniote tetrapod fossils from the Late Permian Sundyr Tetrapod Assemblage (Mari El, Russia) is published by Golubev & Bulanov (2018).
- A study on the relationship between taxonomic and ecological diversity of temnospondyls across the Permian–Triassic boundary in the Karoo Basin of South Africa is published by Tarailo (2018).
- A study on the morphology and phylogenetic relationships of Neldasaurus is published by Schoch (2018).
- A study on the morphological changes in the skull that have been considered related to size reduction in dissorophoids, evaluating whether these changes are consistent with the consequences of miniaturization according to the studies in extant miniature amphibians, is published by Pérez-Ben, Schoch & Báez (2018).
- A study on the phylogenetic relationships of dissorophoid temnospondyls, and on their relationship to modern amphibians, is published by Schoch (2018), who names new taxon Amphibamiformes.
- Well-preserved postcranial skeletons of two dissorophids are described from the early Permian karst deposits near Richards Spur (Oklahoma, United States) by Gee & Reisz (2018).
- A revision of the fossil material assigned to Fayella chickashaensis is published by Gee, Scott & Reisz (2018), who consider this species to be a nomen dubium.
- Redescription of the holotype specimen of the dissorophid species Alegeinosaurus aphthitos is published by Gee (2018), who considers Alegeinosaurus to be a junior synonym of Aspidosaurus.
- New skull remains of Cacops morrisi, as well as the first known postcranial remains of the taxon, are described from the Permian of the Richards Spur locality (Oklahoma, United States) by Gee & Reisz (2018).
- Two new dissorophid specimens referred to Anakamacops petrolicus are described from the Guadalupian Dashankou Fauna of China by Liu (2018).
- A study on the morphology and phylogenetic relationships of Limnogyrinus elegans is published by Schoch & Witzmann (2018).
- A study on the diversity of the morphology of the feeding system in stereospondyl temnospondyls is published by Penrice & Deeming (2018).
- A study on the anatomy and phylogenetic relationships of Parotosuchus nasutus is published by Schoch (2018).
- A study on the morphology of specimens of Rhytidosteus from southeastern European Russia, and on their implications for inferring possible feeding adaptations of this animal, is published by Sennikov & Novikov (2018).
- Partial mandible of a large-bodied metoposaurid is described from the Upper Triassic Chinle Formation exposures at Petrified Forest National Park (Arizona, United States) by Gee & Parker (2018).
- Morphological description of two new small-bodied metoposaurid specimens from Petrified Forest National Park (Arizona, United States) and a histological analysis of the vertebra of these specimens is published online by Gee & Parker (2018), who argue that their findings support the interpretation of Apachesaurus as a juvenile metoposaurid.
- A small metoposaurid specimen interpreted as a juvenile specimen of Apachesaurus gregorii is described from the Petrified Forest National Park (Arizona, United States) by Rinehart & Lucas (2018).
- A study on the histology of the humeri of members of the species Metoposaurus krasiejowensis, revealing the occurrence of two different growth patterns (histotypes), is published by Teschner, Sander & Konietzko-Meier (2018).
- A study on the feeding mode of Metoposaurus krasiejowensis as indicated by bone microstructure and computational biomechanics is published by Konietzko-Meier et al. (2018).
- Description of the ornamentation of clavicles and skull bones of Metoposaurus krasiejowensis is published by Antczak & Bodzioch (2018).
- Redescription of Regalerpeton weichangensis based on eight new specimens and a study on the phylogenetic relationships of the species is published by Rong (2018).
- An incomplete vertebra of a member of Caudata is described from the Algerian part of the Cretaceous Kem Kem Beds by Alloul et al. (2018).
- Description of bone anomalies in specimens of the cryptobranchid Eoscapherpeton asiaticum from the Upper Cretaceous Bissekty Formation (Uzbekistan) and a study on their possible origin is published by Skutschas et al. (2018).
- A study on the life history of the cryptobranchid Aviturus exsecratus from the Paleocene of Mongolia is published online by Skutschas et al. (2018).
- Description of new specimens of the fossil salamandrids Taricha oligocenica and Taricha lindoei from the Oligocene of Oregon, providing new information on the morphology of these taxa, and a study on the phylogenetic relationships of these species is published by Jacisin & Hopkins (2018).
- Cretaceous frog tracks are described from the Saok Island (South Korea) by Park et al. (2018), who name a new ichnotaxon Ranipes saokensis.
- Fossils of members of the genus Palaeobatrachus are described from the Miocene (Turolian) localities in Adygea (Russia) by Syromyatnikova (2018).
- A redescription and a study of the phylogenetic relationships of Baurubatrachus pricei is published by Báez & Gómez (2018).
- A redescription and a study of the phylogenetic relationships of Eorubeta nevadensis is published by Henrici et al. (2018).
- Description of new fossil material of Thaumastosaurus from three localities in Switzerland, and a revision of the stratigraphic records of the genus Thaumastosaurus and other ranoid fossils from the Eocene of Europe, is published by Vasilyan (2018).
- A study on the skull morphology of Enosuchus breviceps is published by Bulanov & Golubev (2018).
- A study on the anatomy of regenerating tails in two specimens of the Carboniferous lepospondyl Microbrachis pelikani, comparing tail regeneration in this taxon and in extant seal salamander and Ocoee salamander, is published by van der Vos, Witzmann & Fröbisch (2018).
- A study on the skull ornamentation of a large specimen of Brachydectes newberryi from Linton (Ohio, United States) is published by Mann (2018).
- Description of the anatomy of the skeleton of the chroniosuchian species Bystrowiella schumanni and a study on the phylogenetic relationships of chroniosuchians is published by Witzmann & Schoch (2018).
- A study on the variation of digit proportions and trackway parameters in diadectomorph tracks with a relatively short pedal digit V, representing ichnogenus Ichniotherium, is published by Buchwitz & Voight (2018).
