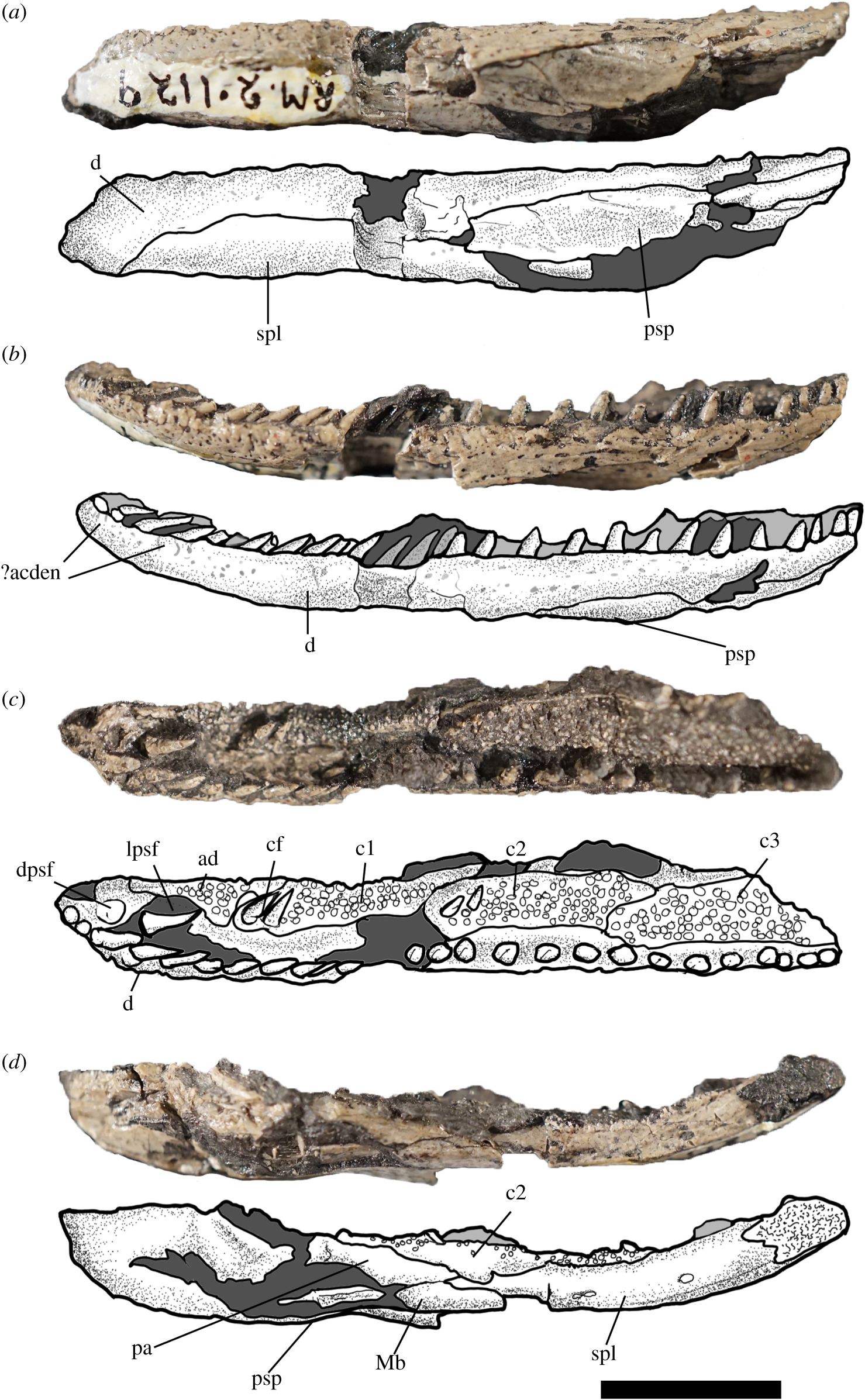
- The holotype jaw in multiple views

Scientific classification
- Kingdom: Animalia
- Phylum: Chordata
- Order: †Aistopoda
- Genus: †Andersonerpeton; Pardo and Mann, 2018

Type species
- †A. longidentatum Dawson, 1876

Synonyms
- Hylerpeton longidentatum Dawson, 1876

= Andersonerpeton =

Andersonerpeton Temporal range: Late Carboniferous, Bashkirian

Extinct genus of tetrapodomorphs

Andersonerpeton is an extinct genus of aïstopod from the Bashkirian (early Pennsylvanian) of Nova Scotia, Canada. It is known from a single jaw, which shares an unusual combination of features from both other aistopods and from stem-tetrapod tetrapodomorph fish. As a result, Andersonerpeton is significant for supporting a new classification scheme which states that aistopods evolved much earlier than previously expected. The genus contains a single species, A. longidentatum, which was previously believed to have been a species of the microsaur Hylerpeton.

== History ==
The type species, A. longidentatum, was initially described by John William Dawson on the basis of RM 2.1129, a left mandible. This fossil hailed from the Joggins fossil cliffs, a site in Nova Scotia famous for fossil deposits dated to the Bashkirian, the first stage of the Pennsylvanian subperiod of the Carboniferous period. A. longidentatum was originally named Hylerpeton longidentatum, as Dawson considered it a new species of the microsaur Hylerpeton, distinct from Hylerpeton dawsoni (the type species of Hylerpeton). Steen (1934) and Carroll (1966) questioned the microsaurian placement of H. longidentatum, but withheld judgment on its taxonomic status, although Carroll (1966) noted similarities to non-tetrapod sarcopterygians. Pardo and Mann (2018) demonstrated that H. longidentatum belongs to the limbless tetrapod clade Aistopoda and renamed it Andersonerpeton in honor of Jason S. Anderson, a contributor to enhanced understanding of aïstopod morphology and phylogeny.

== Description ==
The preserved portion of the jaw was smooth, shallow and relatively wide, curving upwards at the parasymphyseal (chin) region. The main bone of the jaw, the dentary, possessed a single row of long, curved teeth, known as marginal teeth. These teeth were weakly attached to the underlying bone, which allows them to fold backwards. This ability is also seen in certain snakes as well as oestocephalid aistopods, betraying Andersonerpeton's aistopod affinities. Unusually, the teeth also have a maze-like internal structure, formally known as labyrinthine infolding. This type of structure is known in large "labyrinthodont" tetrapods and their tetrapodomorph ancestors, but unknown in any other aistopod.

Lingually from the dentary tooth row (i.e. towards the tongue), the upper surface of the mandible has five plate-like bones: a parasymphyseal plate at the chin, an adsymphyseal bone directly behind it, and a string of three coronoid bones directly behind the adsymphyseal. All five of these bones are covered with tiny tooth-like bumps known as denticles. Larger fangs, similar to the marginal teeth, were also present on some of these bones; the first and second coronoids each have two of these fangs at their front outer corner and the parasympheseal has a single large fang in the middle. Additional denticles may have been present on the dentary, which has a small number of small bumps on the outer surface of the parasymphyseal region. If these were true denticles, then this is a surprisingly "primitive" feature present in Andersonerpeton, as this feature is typically considered to have been lost very early in the evolution of tetrapods (specifically, after the evolution of Elginerpeton). The prominent parasympheseal and coronoid fangs are also more consistent with stem-tetrapods rather than other aistopods. Andersonerpeton does have one specific feature shared by both certain aistopods and certain stem-tetrapods: a longitudinal plate of bone directly below the coronoids, known as a "meckelian ossification".

== Classification ==
The uniquely foldable teeth indicate that Andersonerpeton is an aistopod, as these teeth are also seen in Coloraderpeton and Oestocephalus, but no other tetrapods until the appearance of snakes in the Cretaceous period. In addition, the mandible was smooth and wide, similar to that of most aistopods. However, in many other features the jaw of Andersonerpeton closely resembles early tetrapod relatives such as Elginerpeton. These include the arrangement of teeth and denticles on the parasympheseal and coronoid bones, as well as labyrinthine marginal teeth. The possible presence of denticles on the dentary next to the tooth row is particularly significant, as these are present in many tetrapodomorph fish but completely lacking in all but the earliest four-limbed vertebrates, with Elginerpeton believed to have been the last known animal to have possessed such a feature. Overall, Andersonerpeton seems to bridge a gap between stem-tetrapods and aistopods. This classification scheme contrasts with traditional interpretations of aistopods forming a group called Lepospondyli with animals like Diplocaulus and microsaurs, which are almost always considered true crown-tetrapods. However, the idea that aistopods branched off from the tetrapodomorph family tree much earlier than other lepospondyls has been supported by some analyses, such as a 2017 study on the braincase of Lethiscus, which was considered to have been the most "primitive" aistopod prior to the naming of Andersonerpeton.
