= Tuditanus (disambiguation) =

Tuditanus is an extinct genus of prehistoric amphibian.

Tuditanus may also refer to:

- Members of the ancient Roman family Sempronii Tuditani, including:
  - Publius Sempronius Tuditanus (fl. 3rd century BC), a Roman Republican consul and censor
  - Gaius Sempronius Tuditanus, a politician and historian of the Roman Republic and consul in 129 BC
