= Domoušice =

- Municipality
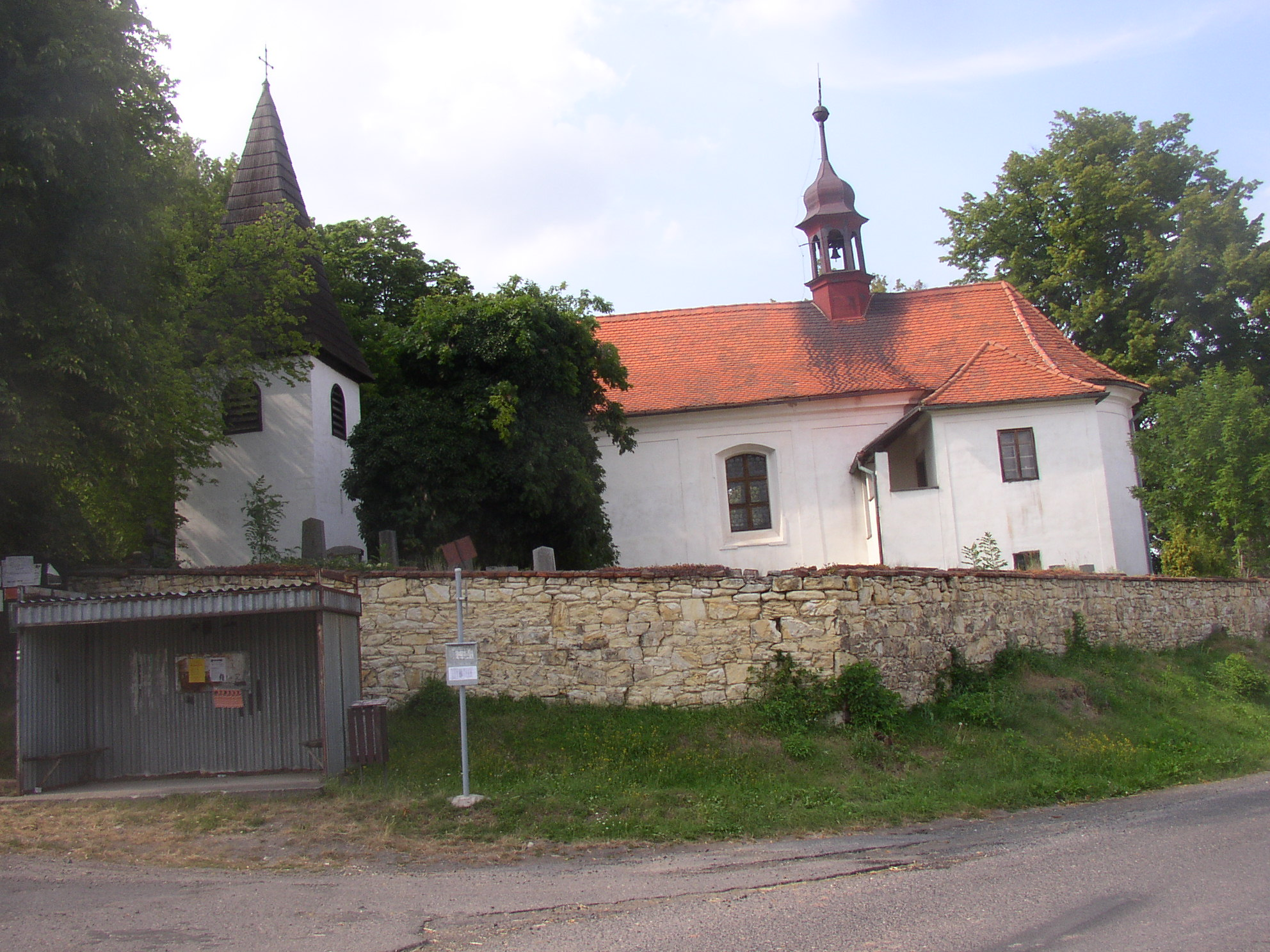
- Church of Saint Martin

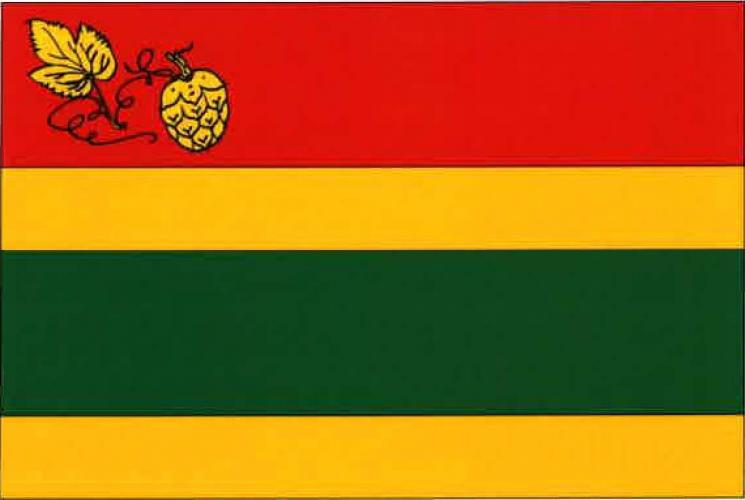
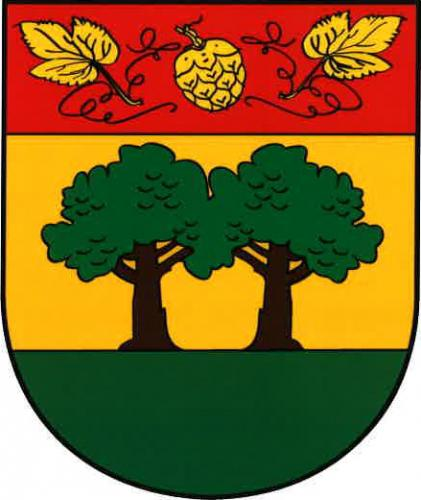
- Flag Coat of arms

- Location in the Czech Republic
- Coordinates: 50°14′3″N 13°43′47″E
- Country: Czech Republic
- Region: Ústí nad Labem
- District: Louny
- First mentioned: 1325

Area
  - Total: 15.28 km^{2} (5.90 sq mi)
- Elevation: 415 m (1,362 ft)

Population (2026-01-01)
  - Total: 625
  - Density: 40.9/km^{2} (106/sq mi)
- Time zone: UTC+1 (CET)
  - Summer (DST): UTC+2 (CEST)
- Postal codes: 439 68, 440 01
- Website: www.domousice.cz

Domoušice (German: Domauschitz) is a municipality and village in Louny District in the Ústí nad Labem Region of the Czech Republic. It has about 600 inhabitants.

== Administrative division ==
Domoušice consists of two municipal parts (in brackets population according to the 2021 census):

- Domoušice (459)
- Solopysky (179)

== Etymology ==
The initial name of the settlement was Domašice. The name was derived from the personal name Domaše, meaning "the village of Domaše's people". In the 18th century, the name evolved into its present form.

== Geography ==
Domoušice is located about 14 kilometres (9 mi) southwest of Louny and 46 km (29 mi) northwest of Prague. It lies in the Džbán range. The highest point is the hill Pískový vrch at 526 m (1,726 ft) above sea level. The Hasina Stream originates here and flows across the municipality.

== History ==
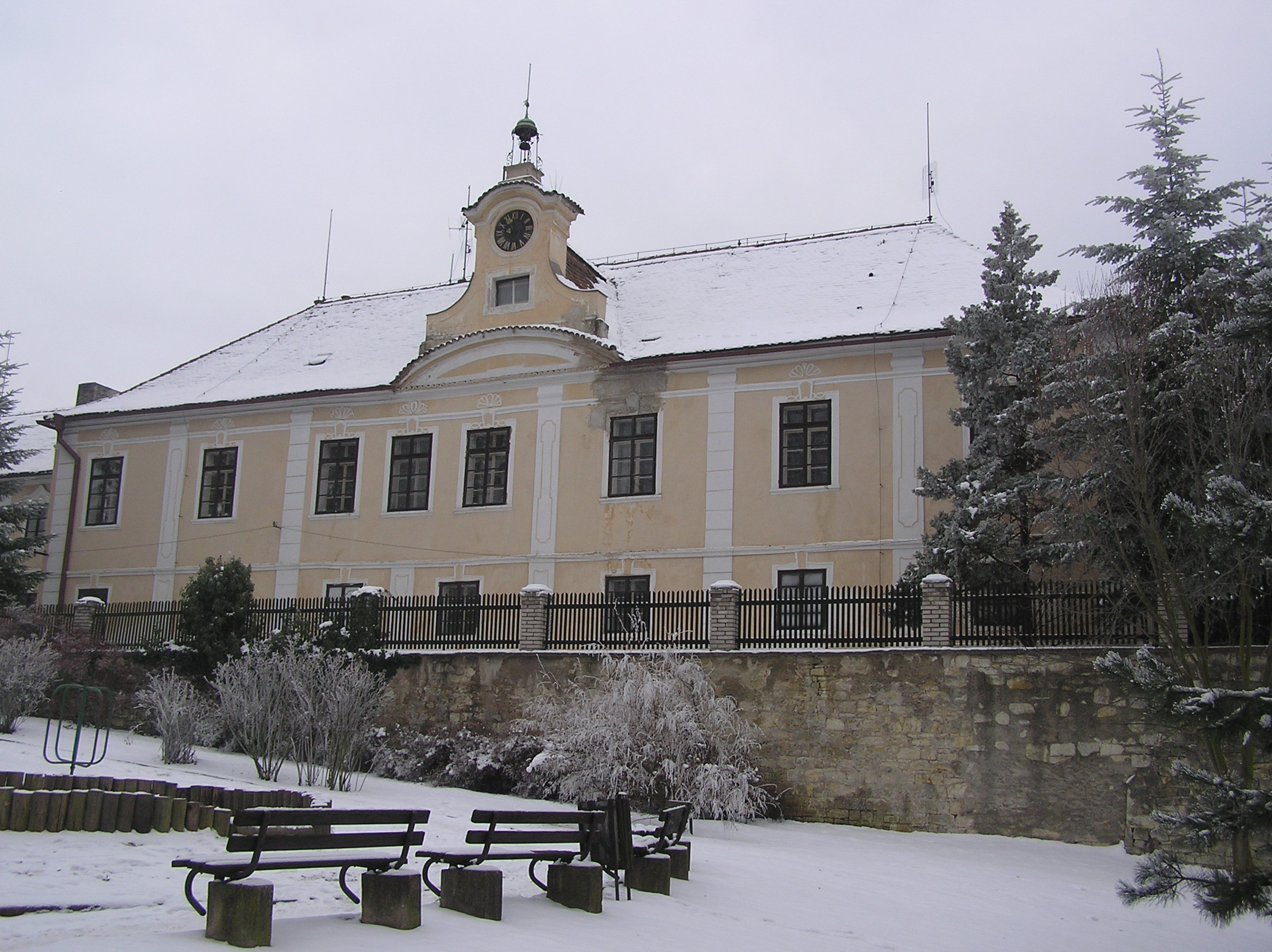
Domoušice Castle

The area of the Na Rovinách gord was inhabited already in the prehistoric times. The first written mention of Domoušice is from 1325, when King John of Bohemia donated the village to Knight Chval and his son Dětřich. The next owner of the village was the Ostrov Monastery in Davle. After the Hussite Wars, Domoušice was property of various noblemen. In 1599–1627, Domoušnice was owned by Old Town of Prague. From 1628, the village was ruled by the Metropolitan Chapter at Saint Vitus.

== Demographics ==
Historical population

Year	Pop.	±%
1869	1,052	—
1880	1,234	+17.3%
1890	1,234	+0.0%
1900	1,240	+0.5%
1910	1,413	+14.0%

Year	Pop.	±%
1921	1,534	+8.6%
1930	1,486	−3.1%
1950	1,073	−27.8%
1961	1,108	+3.3%
1970	958	−13.5%

Year	Pop.	±%
1980	840	−12.3%
1991	649	−22.7%
2001	625	−3.7%
2011	655	+4.8%
2021	638	−2.6%

Source: Censuses

== Transport ==
Domoušice is located on the Rakovník–Most railway line. The municipality is served by two train stations: Domoušice and Solopysky.

== Sights ==
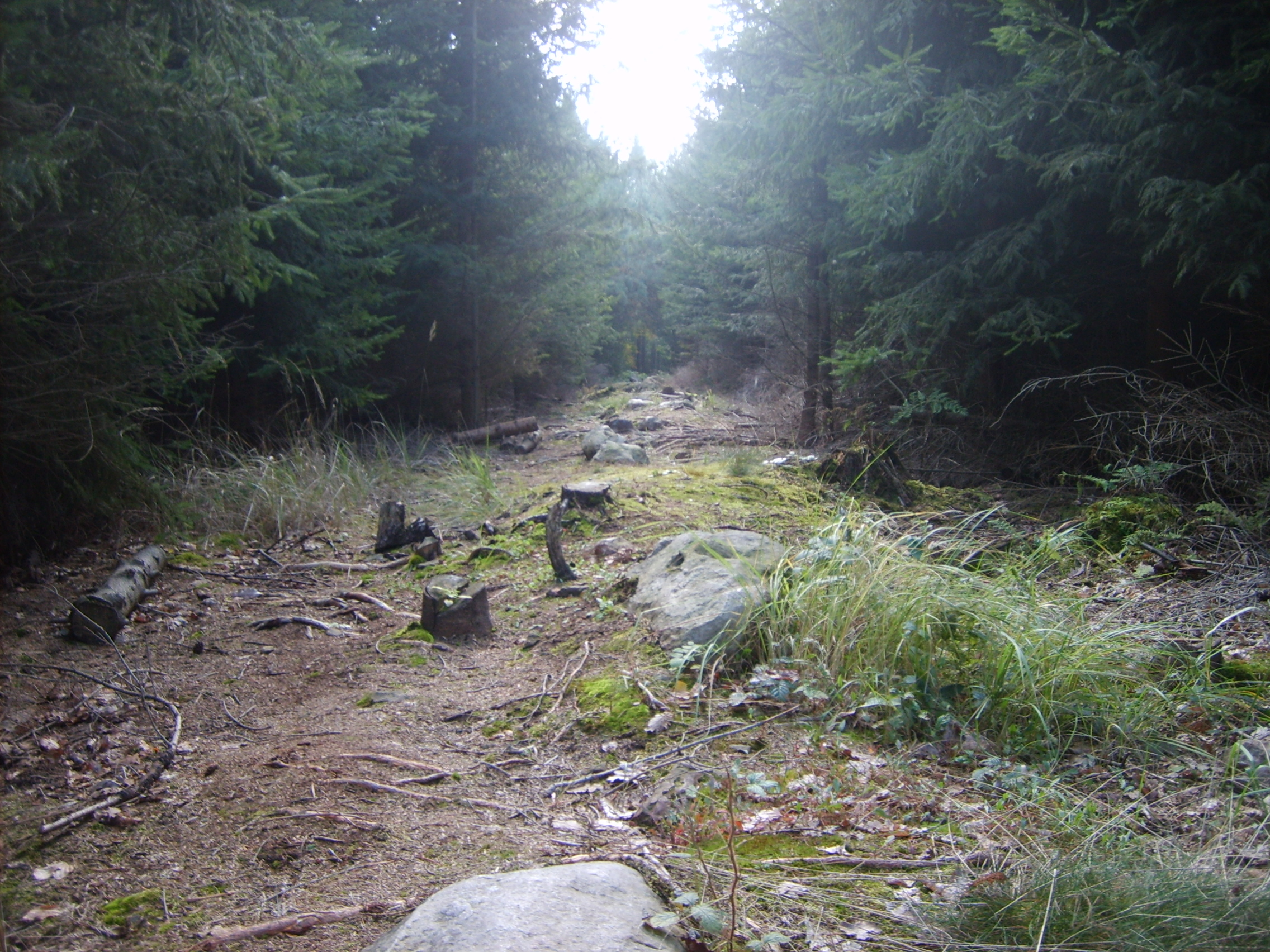
Kounov stone series

The most valuable building is the Church of Saint Martin. It was built in the Baroque style in 1754.

The Domoušice Castle is a small rural Baroque mansion from the beginning of the 18th century. Today it is the seat of the forest administration.

Kounov stone series are ancient stone rows, which are often called the most mysterious place in the Czech Republic. They contain about 2,000 quartz stones, most often 80 cm in diameter, and run several hundred metres at irregular intervals from north to south in parallel rows. They are located on a raised plateau in the western part of the municipality and are named after the neighbouring village of Kounov.
