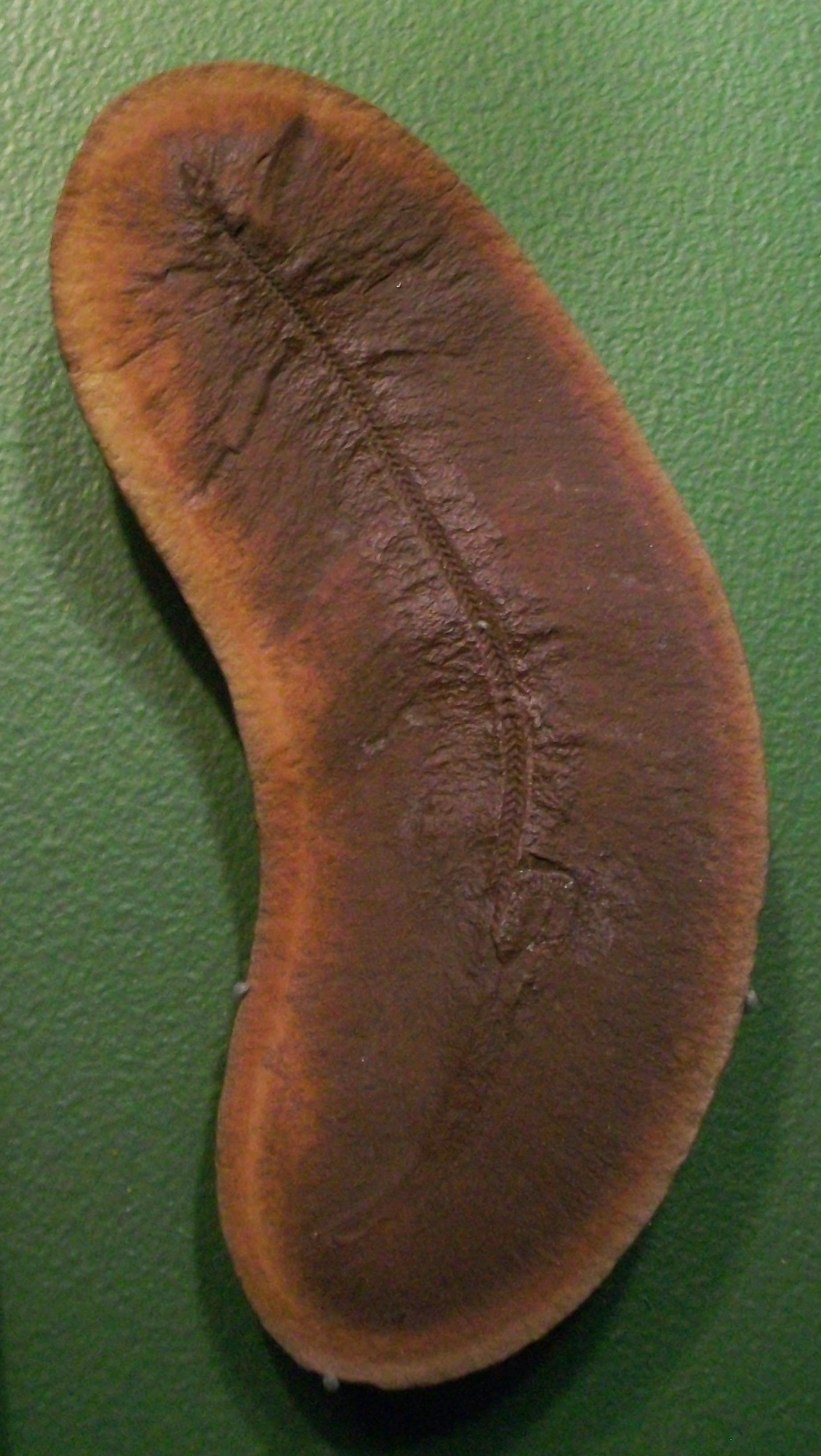
- Fossil of P. turnbullorum in the Field Museum of Natural History

Scientific classification
- Kingdom: Animalia
- Phylum: Chordata
- Order: †Aistopoda
- Clade: †Phlegethontioidea
- Family: †Pseudophlegethontiidae; Anderson, 2003
- Genus: †Pseudophlegethontia; Anderson, 2003
- Species: †P. turnbullorum

Binomial name
- †Pseudophlegethontia turnbullorum Anderson, 2003

= Pseudophlegethontia =

Pseudophlegethontia Temporal range: Late Carboniferous, 300 Ma

Extinct genus of tetrapodomorphs

Pseudophlegethontia is an extinct genus of aïstopod tetrapodomorphs. It is the only member of the family Pseudophlegethontiidae. The only species is the type species P. turnbullorum, named in 2003. Fossils of Pseudophlegethontia have been found from the Mazon Creek fossil beds in Grundy County, Illinois, a conservation lagerstätte well known for the exceptional preservation of middle Pennsylvanian taxa.

Pseudophlegethontia has been considered to be morphologically intermediate between derived phlegethontiids and more basal "ophiderpetontids" such as Ophiderpeton. It possesses basal characters such as a relatively short body, "k shaped" ribs, and distinctive skull roof bones while also possessing several more derived features such as a pointed snout, thin gastralia, and a lack of dorsal osteoderms. It is usually, but not unanimously, placed as the sister taxon to phlegethontiids, represented by Phlegethontia.
