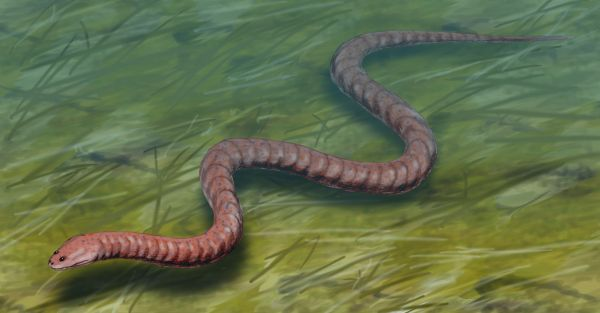
- Life restoration of O. brownriggi

Scientific classification
- Domain: Eukaryota
- Kingdom: Animalia
- Phylum: Chordata
- Clade: Sarcopterygii
- Clade: Tetrapodomorpha
- Order: †Aistopoda
- Family: †Ophiderpetontidae; Schwarz, 1908
- Genus: †Ophiderpeton; Huxley, 1866

Species
- †O. granulosum; †O. brownriggi; †O. kirktonense; †O. amphiuminum; †O. nanum; †O. vicinum; †O. pectinatum; †O. zieglerianum

= Ophiderpeton =

Ophiderpeton Temporal range: Early Carboniferous–Early Permian, 345.3–294.6 Ma

Extinct genus of tetrapodomorphs

Ophiderpeton (from Greek: ὄφῐς óphis, 'snake' and Greek: ἑρπετόν herpetón 'creeper') is an extinct genus of aistopod tetrapodomorphs from the early Carboniferous to the early Permian. Remains of this genus are widespread and were found in Ohio, United States, Ireland, and the Czech Republic (Central Europe).

Like other aistopods, Ophiderpeton was snake-like, without any trace of limbs. Its body was about 70 centimetres (28 in) long, with 230 vertebrae. The skull measured 15 millimetres (0.59 in), and large, forward-facing eyes, suggesting a hunting lifestyle. It probably lived in burrows, feeding on insects, worms, millipedes, and snails.

Many species are classified in the genus, and similar animals, Phlegethontia and Sillerpeton, are known. An earlier genus, Lethiscus, is known from the Carboniferous and Early Permian.
