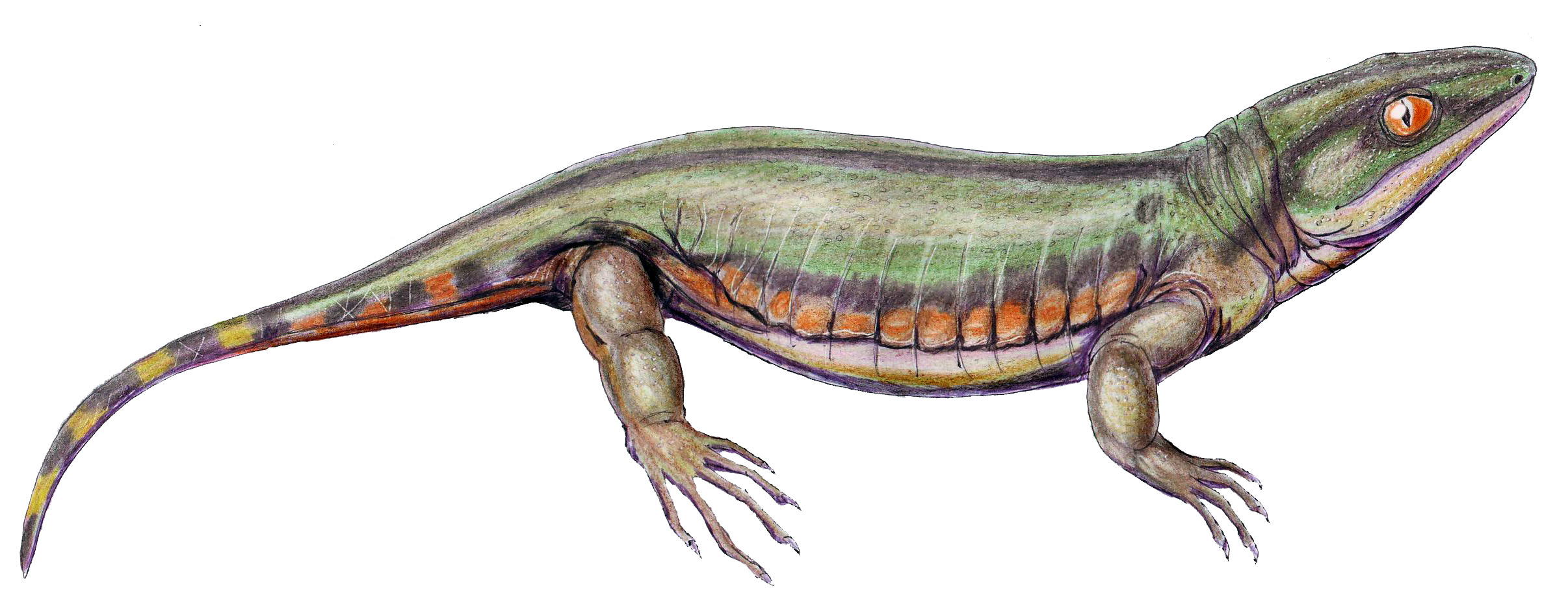
- Tuditanus punctulatus

Scientific classification
- Kingdom: Animalia
- Phylum: Chordata
- Clade: †Microsauria
- Suborder: †Tuditanomorpha
- Family: †Tuditanidae; Cope, 1875

Genera
- Boii; Crinodon; Tuditanus

= Tuditanidae =

Tuditanidae Temporal range: Late Carboniferous

Extinct family of tetrapods

Tuditanidae is an extinct family of microsaurian tetrapods. Fossils have been found from Nova Scotia, Ohio, and the Czech Republic and are Late Carboniferous in age.

Tuditanids were medium-sized terrestrial microsaurs that resembled lizards. Postcranial material is best known from the genus Tuditanus, showing that it had size, proportions, and skull configuration that were similar to captorhinids. Tuditanids have also developed an astragalus in the ankle (a reptilian feature) from the fusion of several other bones.

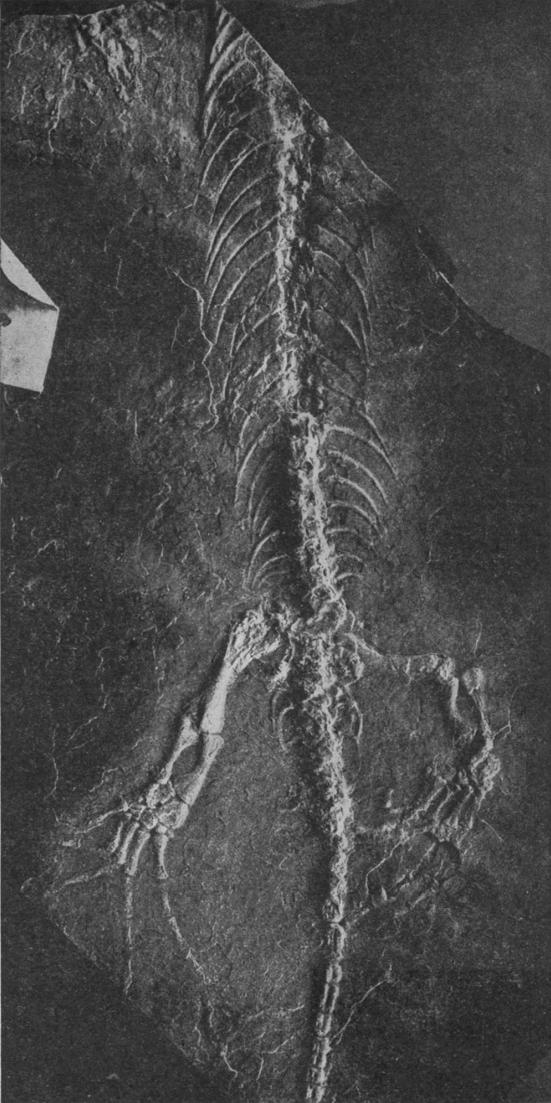
A 1908 photograph of a specimen of Tuditanus punctulatus.

In comparison to other microsaurs, tuditanids were short-bodied, with fewer than 30 presacral vertebrae. The limbs are large and well developed. Unlike other microsaurs such as gymnarthrids, the jaw articulation is at the posterior margin of the skull. The teeth are blunt and peg-like.

Tuditanids are thought to have had a similar lifestyle to reptiles such as captorhinids. They were terrestrial and likely fed on insects and other small arthropods. The similarity between tuditanids and contemporary reptiles may have contributed to their rarity in the Late Carboniferous and their relatively early extinction before the start of the Permian.

Asaphestra, previously thought to be the member of Tuditanidae, was reclassified as primitive synapsid in 2020.
