= Lethiscus =

Lethiscus Temporal range: Early Carboniferous

Scientific classification
- Domain: Eukaryota
- Kingdom: Animalia
- Phylum: Chordata
- Clade: Sarcopterygii
- Clade: Tetrapodomorpha
- Order: †Aistopoda
- Family: †Lethiscidae; Wellstead, 1982
- Genus: †Lethiscus; Wellstead, 1982
- Species: †L. stocki

Binomial name
- †Lethiscus stocki Wellstead, 1982

Extinct genus of tetrapodomorphs

Lethiscus is the earliest known representative of the Aistopoda, a group of very specialised snake-like tetrapodomorphs known from the early Carboniferous (Mississippian).

Lethiscus is known from only a single specimen from the Holkerian Stage (Middle Viséan) of the Early Carboniferous (Middle Mississippian) of Scotland, and is one of the oldest known post Devonian tetrapods. Despite its very early date, it was already a highly advanced animal.

The skull is specialised and light, very like that of Ophiderpeton, with the orbits, far forward, and the cheek region unossified (lacking bone). There are approximately 30 closely spaced teeth on the maxilla and dentary, and a sutural pattern of the skull closely resembles that of the Late Carboniferous aïstopod Oestocephalus.

There is no trace of limbs. However, unlike later members of the aïstopod lineage, the vertebrae still possess intercentra, and the pleurocentra are large.

Lethiscus is the only representative of the family Lethiscidae. Owing to its early date, it has since its discovery been considered ancestral to later aïstopods, and more recent cladistic research (Anderson et al. 2003) confirms its position as the most basal (primitive) aistopod. A 2017 cladistic analysis incorporated new data on Lethiscus found all aïstopods, including Lethiscus, to be stem-tetrapods, rendering Lepospondyli polyphyletic.
