= Crinodon =

Crinodon Temporal range: Carboniferous (Westphalian) 313–304 Ma

Scientific classification
- Kingdom: Animalia
- Phylum: Chordata
- Clade: †Microsauria
- Family: †Tuditanidae
- Genus: †Crinodon; Carroll & Gaskill, 1978

Species
- Crinodon limnophyes Steen, 1938

Synonyms
- Ricnodon limnophyes Steen, 1938

Extinct genus of tetrapods

Crinodon is an extinct genus of microsaur within the family Tuditanidae. The type and only species C. limnophyes was found in Carboniferous deposits of Nyrany (Czech Republic) and described by M. C. Steen in 1938 as Ricnodon limnophyes. It was assigned to the new genus Crinodon by R. L. Carroll and P. Gaskill in 1978.
