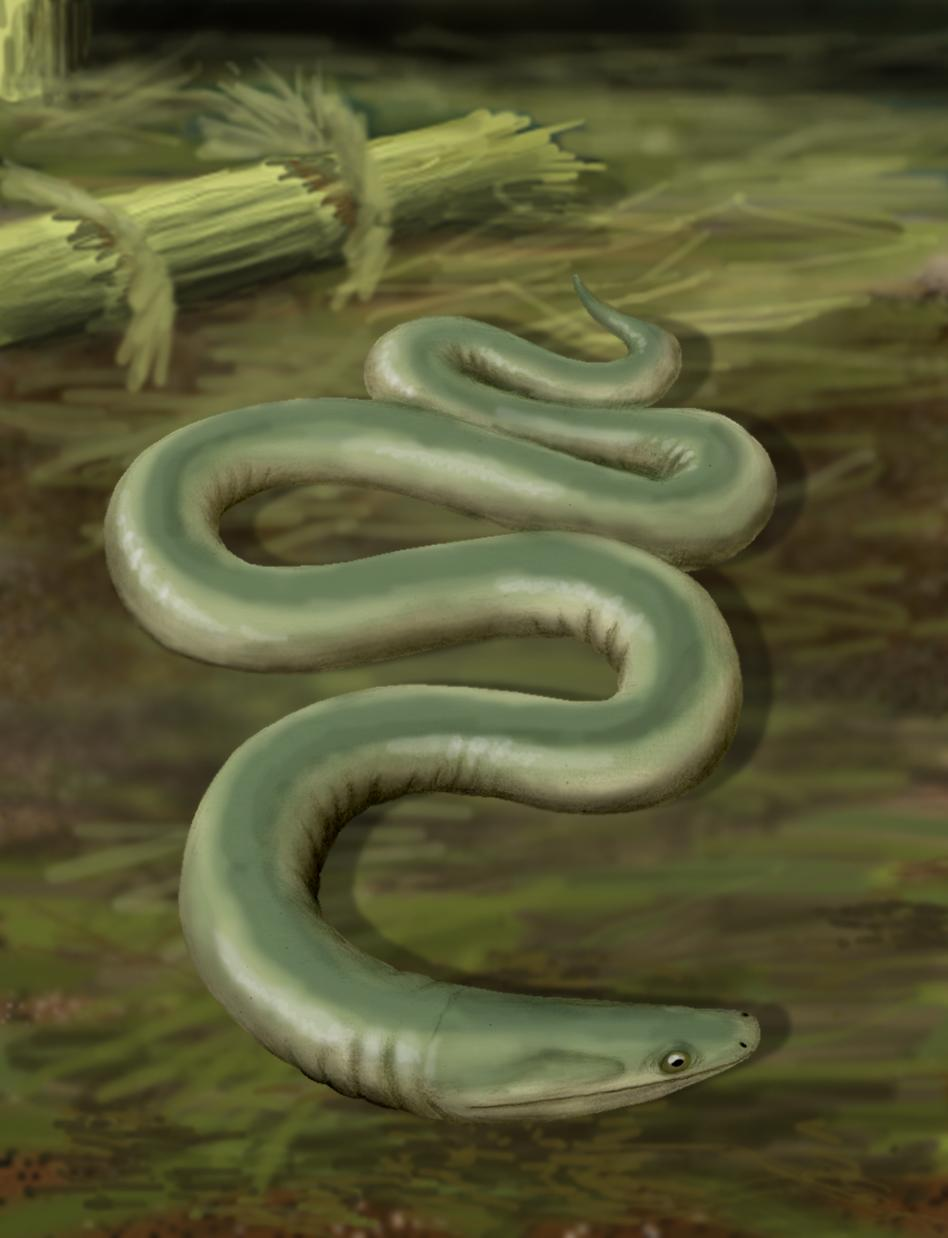

Scientific classification
- Kingdom: Animalia
- Phylum: Chordata
- Order: †Aistopoda
- Family: †Oestocephalidae
- Genus: †Oestocephalus; Cope, 1868

Species
- O. amphiuminus Cope, 1868 (type); O. nanum Hancock & Atthey, 1868

= Oestocephalus =

Oestocephalus Temporal range: Carboniferous

Extinct genus of tetrapodomorphs

Oestocephalus is an extinct genus of aïstopod tetrapodomorphs that lived during the Carboniferous period. Fossils have been found in the Czech Republic, and in Ohio and Illinois in the United States. It is the type genus of the family Oestocephalidae, although it used to be assigned to the family Ophiderpetontidae, which is now considered paraphyletic. It was named by Edward Drinker Cope in 1868 and now contains two species, O. amphiuminus and O. nanum.
