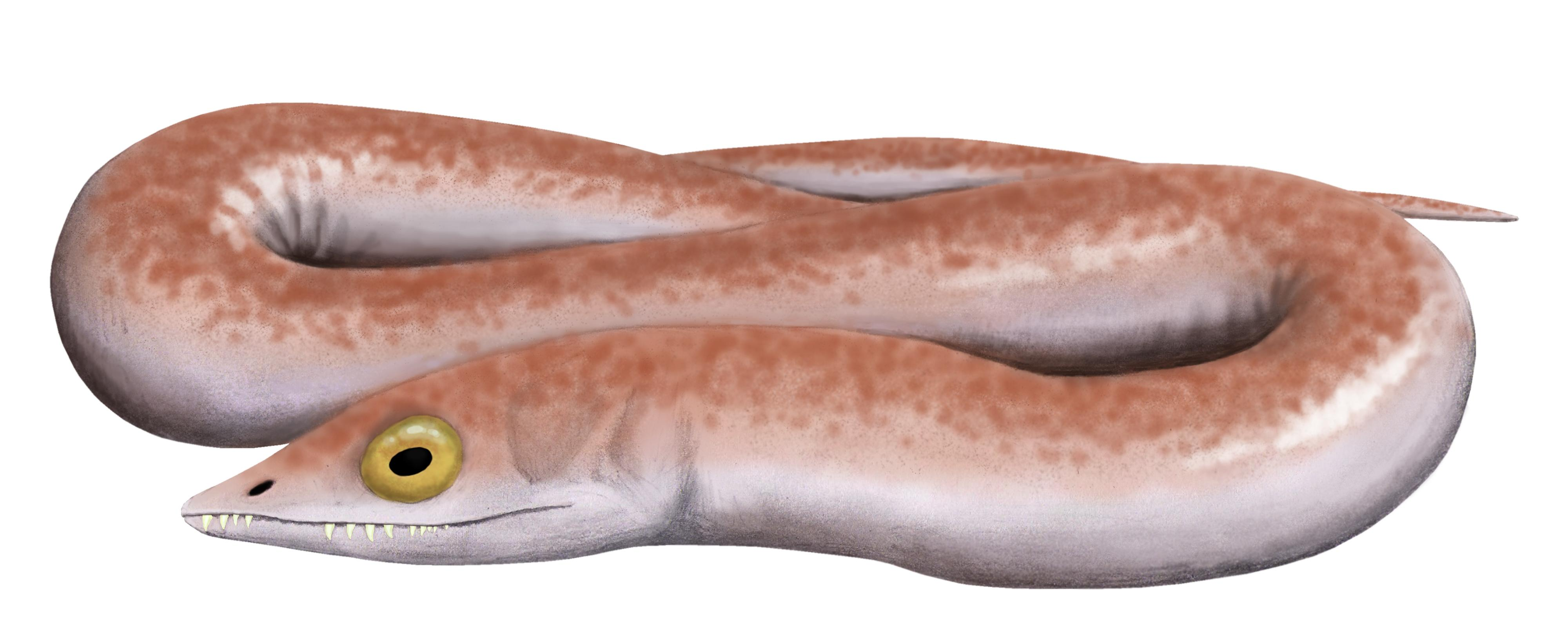
- Life restoration of P. longissima

Scientific classification
- Kingdom: Animalia
- Phylum: Chordata
- Order: †Aistopoda
- Family: †Phlegethontiidae
- Genus: †Phlegethontia; Cope, 1871

Species
- P. linearis Cope, 1871 (type); P. longissima (Fritsch, 1875)

Synonyms
- Aornerpeton Lund, 1978

= Phlegethontia =

Phlegethontia Temporal range: Late Carboniferous–Cisuralian 320 - 290 Ma

Extinct genus of tetrapodomorphs

Phlegethontia is an extinct genus of aïstopod tetrapodomorphs from the Carboniferous and Permian periods of Europe and North America.

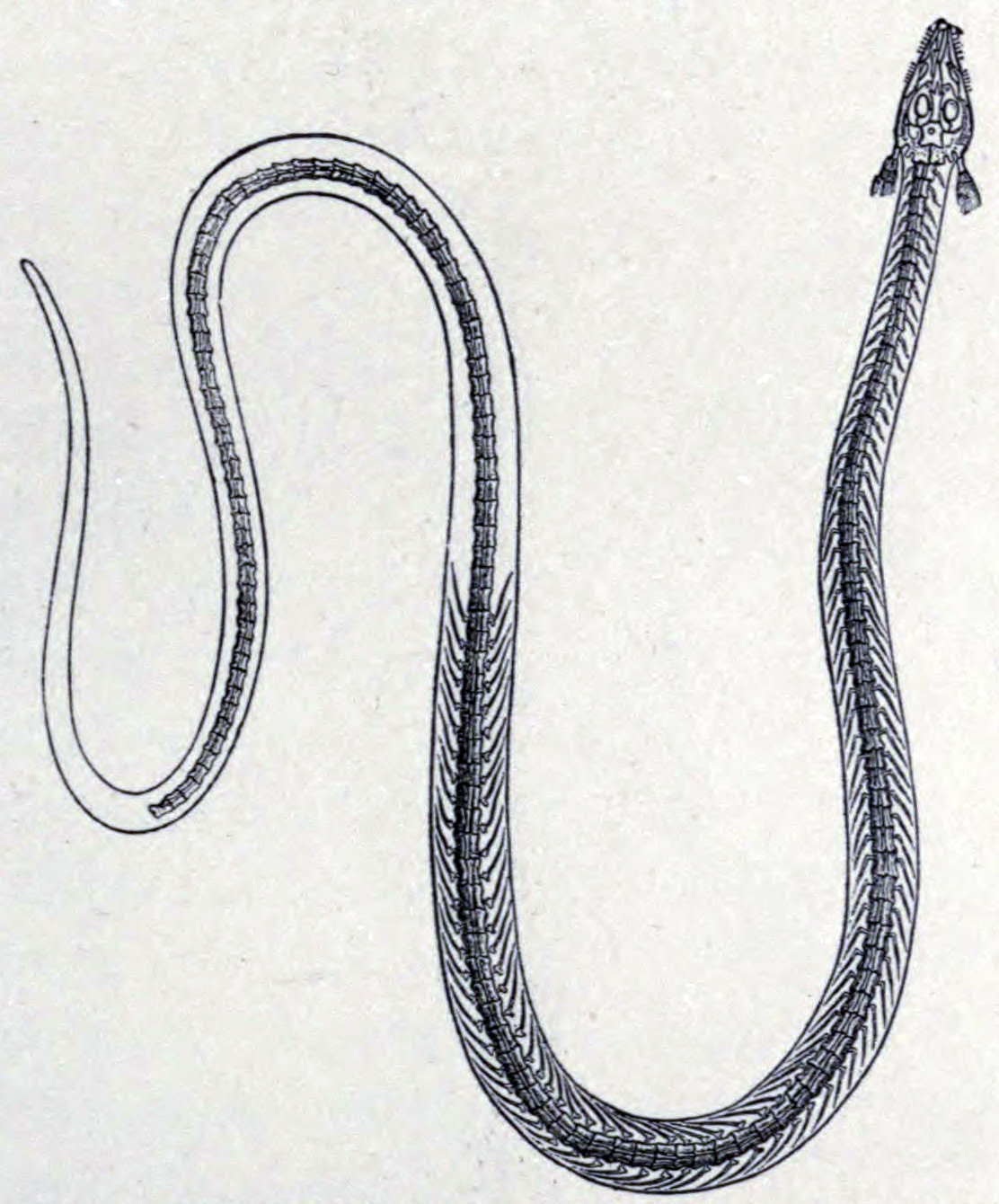
Early restoration of P. longissima

It was about 1 metre (3.3 ft) long, and possessed a lightly built skull with many openings, unlike some of its earlier relatives.

"Dolichosoma" longissima, named by Antonin Fritsch in 1875, has been reassigned to the genus Phlegethontia and is now considered to be P. longissima. "Dolichosoma" has been considered to be a nomen nudum because the holotype was inadequately described through a layer of matrix by Thomas Henry Huxley in 1867.
