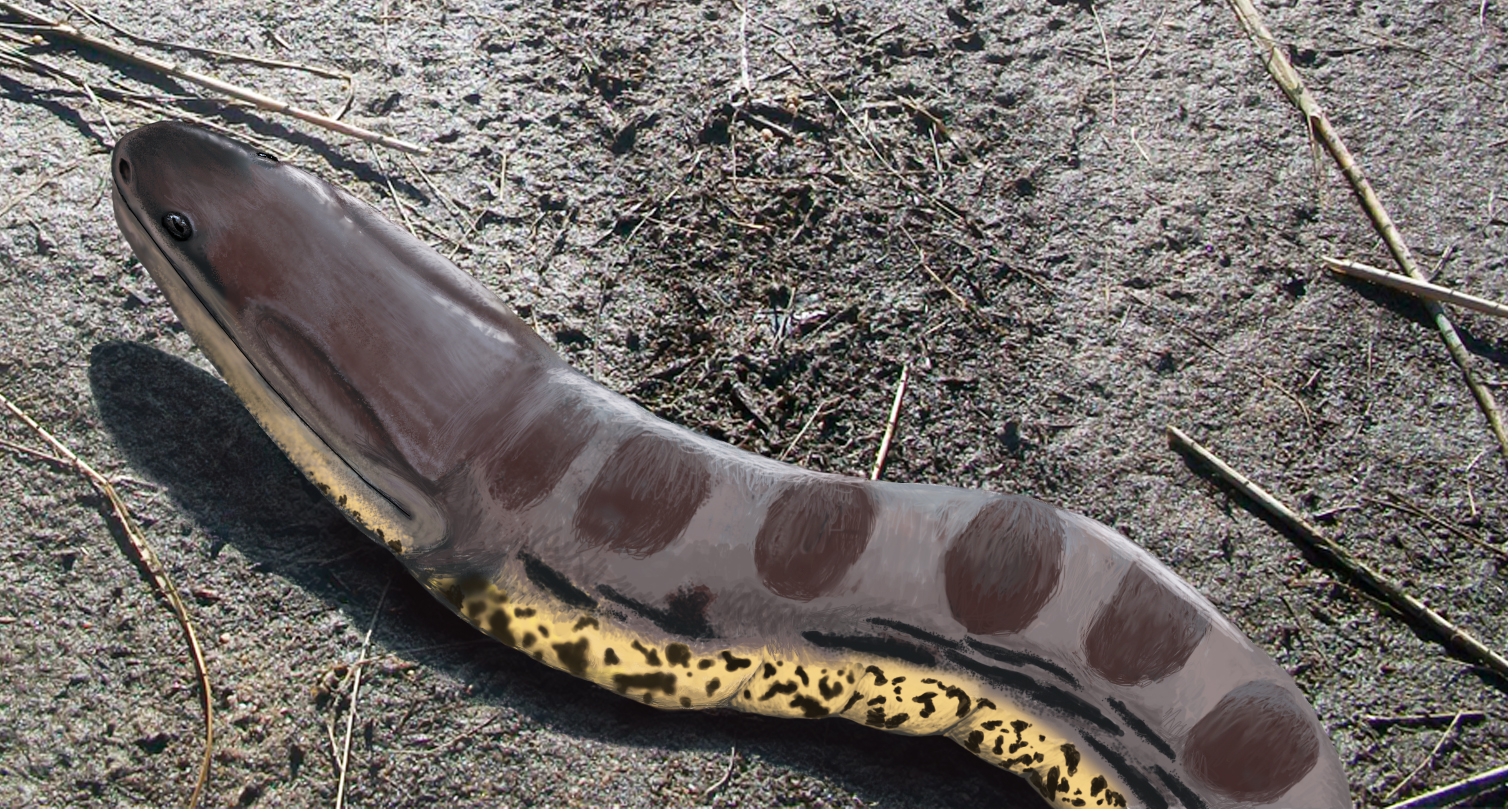
- Life restoration

Scientific classification
- Domain: Eukaryota
- Kingdom: Animalia
- Phylum: Chordata
- Clade: Sarcopterygii
- Clade: Tetrapodomorpha
- Order: †Aistopoda
- Family: †Oestocephalidae
- Genus: †Coloraderpeton; Vaughn, 1969
- Species: †C. brilli

Binomial name
- †Coloraderpeton brilli Vaughn, 1969

= Coloraderpeton =

Coloraderpeton Temporal range: Late Carboniferous, 302 Ma

Extinct genus of tetrapodomorphs

Coloraderpeton is an extinct tetrapodomorph in the genus aïstopod within the family Oestocephalidae. Coloraderpeton is known from the Carboniferous Sangre de Cristo Formation of Colorado, and was initially known from vertebrae, ribs, and scales recovered from a UCLA field expedition in 1966. Peter Paul Vaughn described these remains in 1969. A skull was later reported in an unpublished 1983 thesis and formally described by Jason S. Anderson in 2003.
