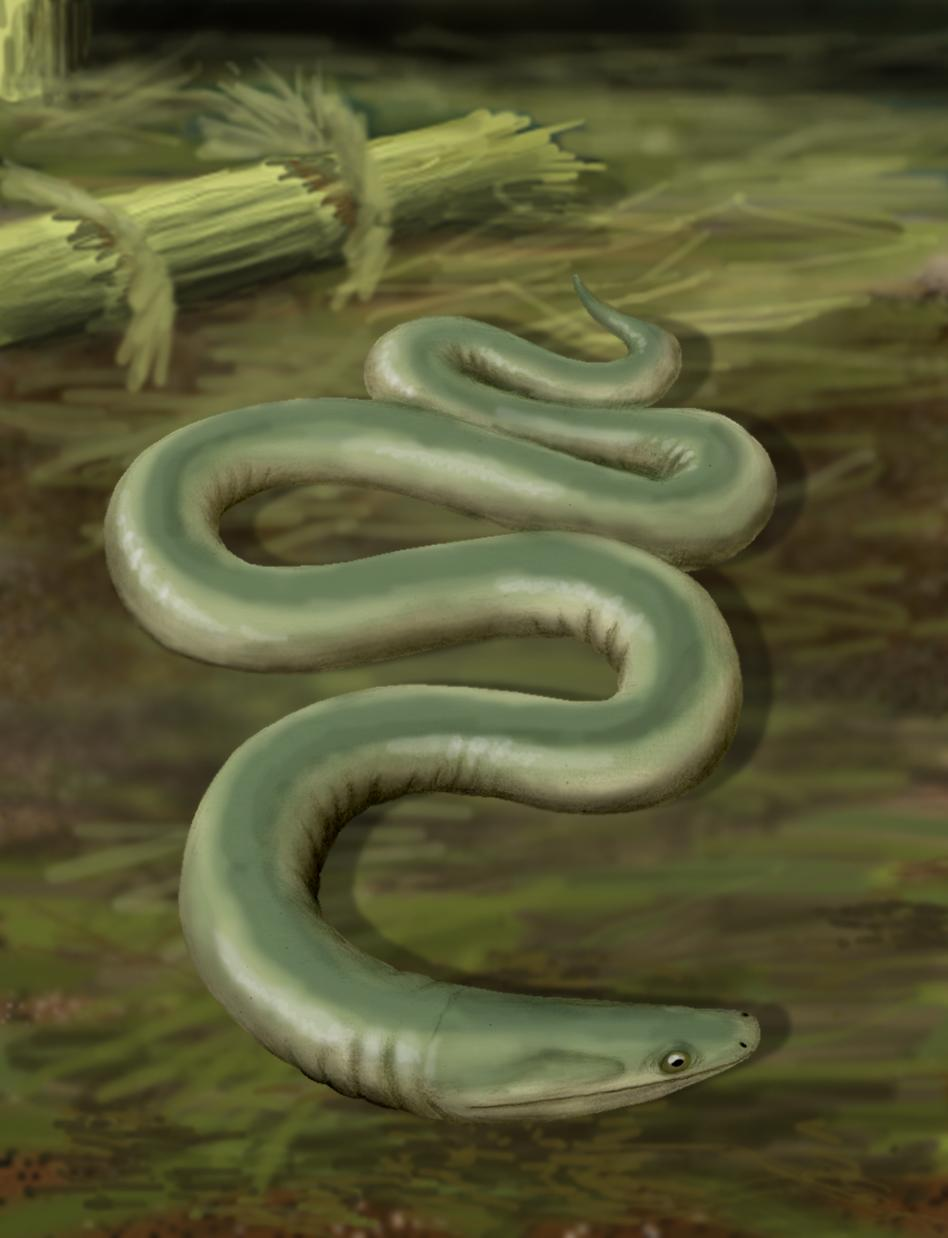
- Restoration of Oestocephalus amphiuminus

Scientific classification
- Kingdom: Animalia
- Phylum: Chordata
- Clade: Stegocephali
- Order: †Aistopoda; Miall, 1875

Subgroups
- Andersonerpeton; Lethiscus; Ophiderpeton; Oestocephalidae; Coloraderpeton; Oestocephalus; Phlegethontioidea; Pseudophlegethontia; Phlegethontiidae; Phlegethontia; Sillerpeton

= Aistopoda =

Aistopoda Temporal range: 336–272 Ma

Extinct order of amphibians

Aistopoda (Greek for "[having] not-visible feet") is an order of highly specialised snake-like stegocephalians known from the Carboniferous and Early Permian of Europe and North America, ranging from tiny forms only 5 cm (1.97 in), to nearly 1 m (3 ft 3 in) in length. They first appear in the fossil record in the Mississippian period and continue through to the Early Permian.

== Anatomy ==
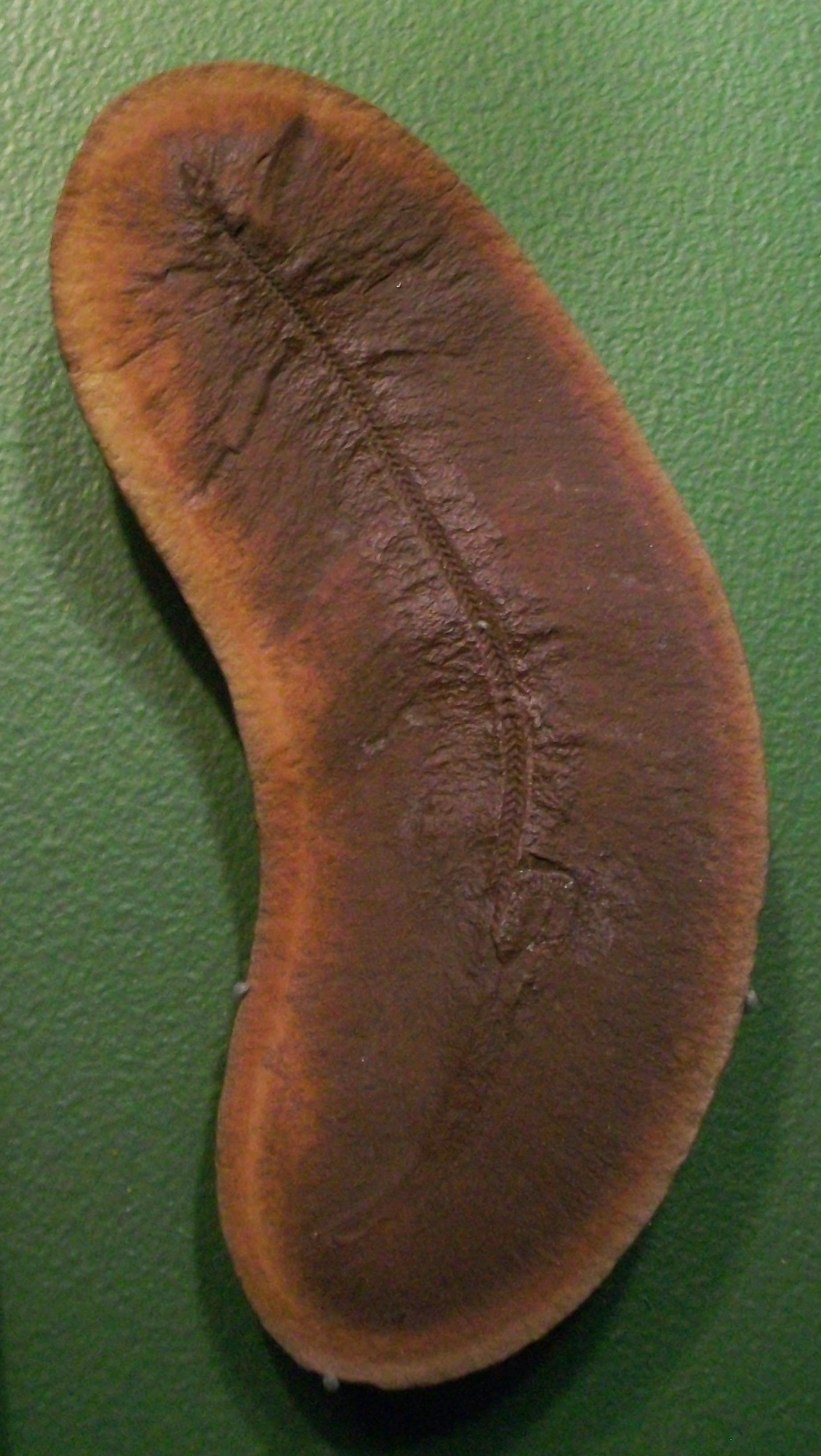
Fossil of Pseudophlegethontia turnbullorum in the Field Museum of Natural History.

The skull is small but very specialised, with large orbits, and large fenestrae. The primitive form Ophiderpeton has a pattern of dermal bones in the skull similar in respects to the temnospondyls. But in the advanced genus Phlegethontia the skull is very light and open, reduced to a series of struts supporting the braincase against the lower jaw, just as in snakes, and it is possible that the aistopods filled the same ecological niches in the Paleozoic that snakes do today. A 2017 paper described the internal organization of the aistopod head, finding that aïstopods retained many fish-like features of the skull and brain, including a persistent extension of the notochord into the head and an open canal between the pituitary gland and the mouth. Because these features are lost early in tetrapod evolution, this may be evidence that aistopods diverged from other tetrapods soon after the origin of digits.

They had an extremely elongated body, with up to 230 vertebrae. The vertebrae were holospondylous, having only a single ossification per segment. They lacked intercentra, even in the tail, and had no free haemal arches. The neural arch was low and fused to the centrum. The ribs were slender, either single- or double-headed, with the head shaped like a letter "K". There is no trace of limbs or even limb girdles in any known fossil, and the tail was short and primitive.

Aistopods appear to have grown via direct development, rather than metamorphosis like most modern amphibians.

== Taxonomy ==
Andersonerpeton is a basal aistopod not assigned to a specific family. Its anatomy supports an early-diverging position for aistopods within Tetrapodomorpha. Other basal aistopods include Lethiscus (placed in the monotypic family Lethiscidae) and Ophiderpeton. The latter is now placed in the monotypic family Ophiderpetontidae, though in some previous work it also included genera now placed in the distinct family Oestocephalidae.

Oestocephalidae is an extinct family of Late Carboniferous aistopods. Fossils have been found in Ohio, Illinois, and Colorado in the United States; England; and the Czech Republic. It includes the genera Coloraderpeton and Oestocephalus. Oestocephalids have robust skulls and narrow, rounded snouts. They possess heavily ossified gastralia and dorsal osteoderms. Like other aïstopods, oestocephalids were elongate, having approximately 110 vertebrae. Oestocephalidae was named in 2003, with the type species being Oestocephalus amphiuminus.

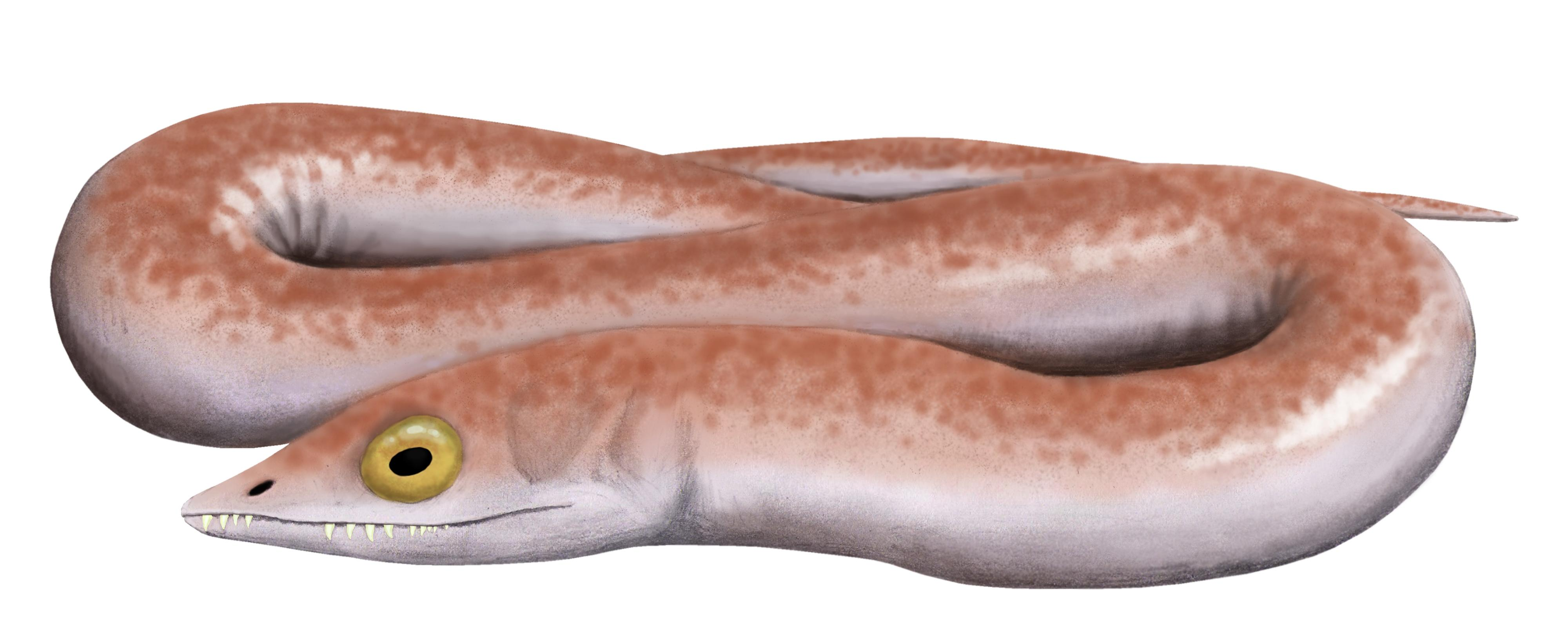
Life restoration of Phlegethontia longissima

Phlegethontioidea is a clade of aistopods. It is a stem-based taxon defined in phylogenetic terms as all aistopods sharing a more recent common ancestor with Phlegethontia than Oestocephalus. It includes the monotypic family Pseudophlegethontiidae, which contains the genus Pseudophlegethontia, and the family Phlegethontiidae, which contains Phlegethontia and Sillerpeton.

== Relationships ==
Evolutionary relationships with other early tetrapods remain controversial, as even the earliest aistopod, the Viséan species Lethiscus stocki, was already highly specialised, although its skull was primitive and extremely fishlike. Aïstopods have been variously grouped with other lepospondyls, or placed at or prior to the batrachomorph-reptiliomorph divide. However, a cladistic analysis by Pardo et al. (2017) recovered Aistopoda at the base of Tetrapoda, a result subsequently supported by Mariscano et al. (2024) and Igielman et al. (2026), although the exact placement of Aistopoda in the tetrapod stem varies among these studies.

Below is a cladogram from Anderson et al. (2003) showing the phylogenetic relationships of aistopods:

- Lepospondyli
  - - Adelogyrinus
    - Asaphestera
    - - Brachydectes
      - Scincosaurus
  - Aïstopoda
    - Lethiscus
    - - Ophiderpeton
      - - Oestocephalidae
          - Coloraderpeton
          - Oestocephalus
        - Phlegethontioidea
          - Pseudophlegethontia
          - Phlegethontiidae
            - Phlegethontia linearis
            - Phlegethontia longissima

Cladogram after Pardo (2024), showing aistopods as stem-tetrapods

- Tetrapodomorpha
  - †Eusthenopteron
  - †Panderichthys
  - - †Tiktaalik
    - limbs present
      - †Ymeria
      - †Ventastega
      - †Ichthyostega
      - - †Acanthostega
        - - †Aistopoda
          - †Whatcheeria
          - †Pederpes
          - - †Crassigyrinus
            - - †Greererpeton
              - - †Embolomeri
                - - - †Eucritta
                    - †Baphetes
                  - crown group Tetrapoda
                    - Temnospondyli (including Lissamphibia)
                    - - †Seymouriamorpha (Seymouria)
                      - - †Diadectomorpha (Limnoscelis)
                        - Amniota (including modern mammals, reptiles and birds)
