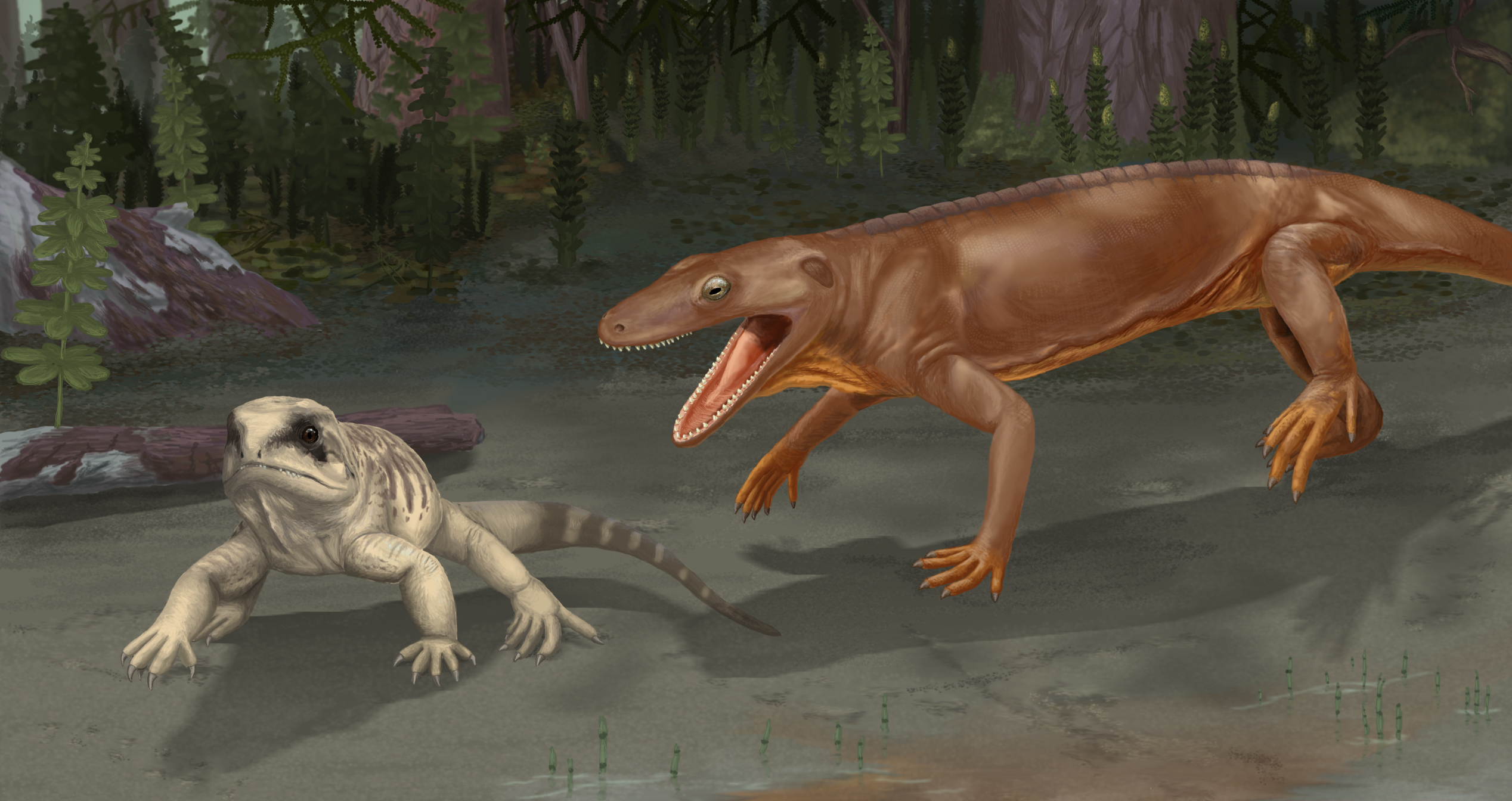
- Life restoration of Nooxobeia gracilis (right) based on specimen UCLA VP 3066.

Scientific classification
- Domain: Eukaryota
- Kingdom: Animalia
- Phylum: Chordata
- Order: †Temnospondyli
- Family: †Dissorophidae
- Genus: †Nooxobeia; Gee, Scott & Reisz, 2018

Type species
- †Nooxobeia gracilis Gee, Scott & Reisz, 2018

= Nooxobeia =

Nooxobeia Temporal range: Early Permian, 271 Ma

Genus of amphibians (fossil)

Nooxobeia is an extinct genus of dissorophid temnospondyl from the Early Permian (Guadalupian) of Oklahoma. The generic name is derived from the Arapaho (a language spoken in the type locality of the holotype) word nooxobe, which means frog.

== Taxonomy ==
Olson (1972) referred a complete dissorophid specimen (UCLA VP 3066) from the Chickasha Formation of Oklahoma to Fayella chickashaensis based on cranial similarities to the holotype. However, in 2018, Gee, Scott and Reisz declared Fayella a nomen dubium and an indeterminate temnospondyl, and made UCLA VP 3066 the holotype of the new species Nooxobeia gracilis.

== See also ==
- Prehistoric amphibian
- List of prehistoric amphibians
