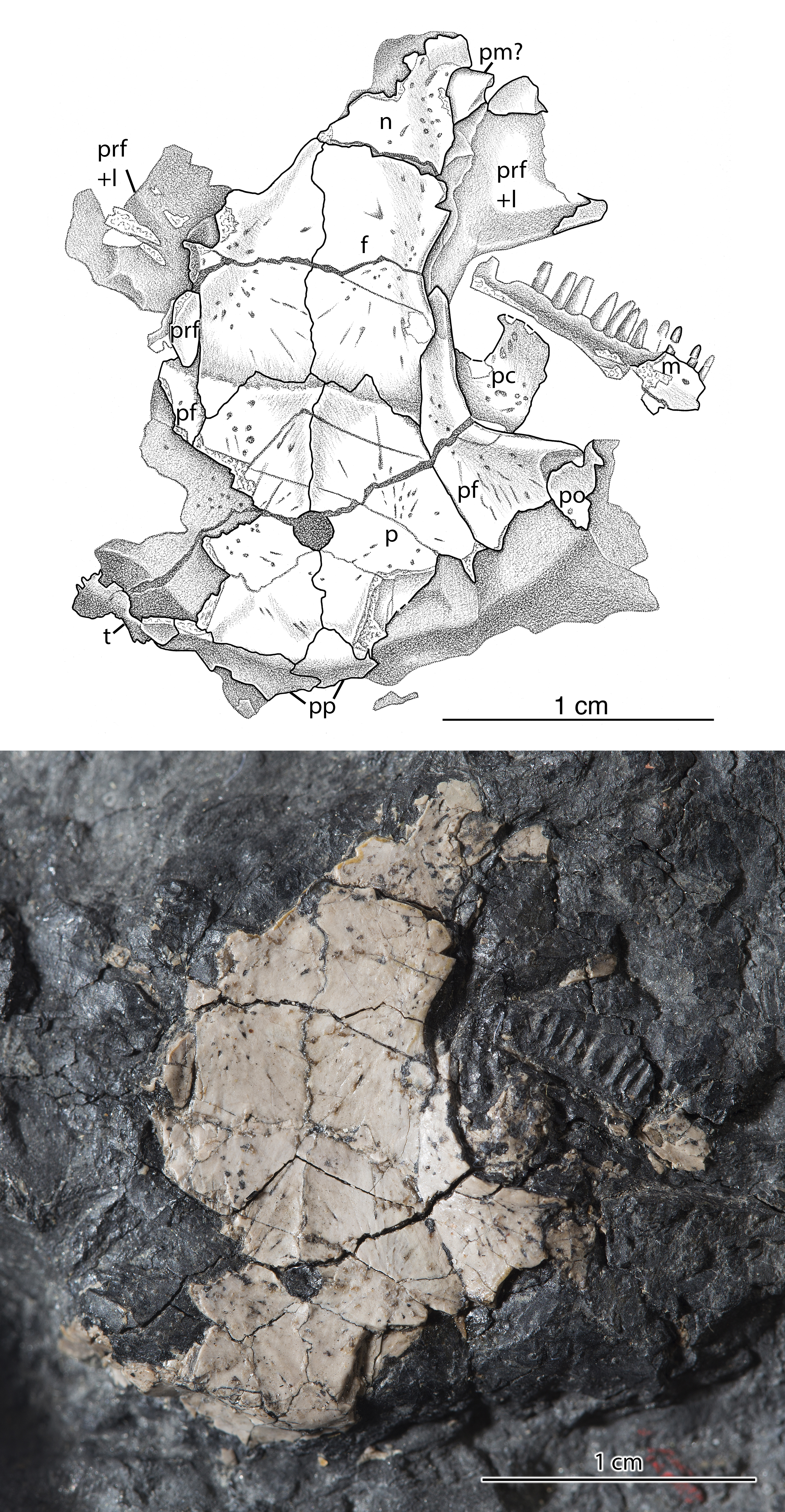
- Holotype specimen

Scientific classification
- Kingdom: Animalia
- Phylum: Chordata
- Clade: Stegocephali
- Clade: Tetrapoda
- Genus: †Asaphestera; Steen, 1934
- Species: †A. platyris

Binomial name
- †Asaphestera platyris Steen, 1934

= Asaphestera =

Asaphestera Temporal range: Carboniferous, 318.1–314.6 Ma

Extinct genus of tetrapods

Asaphestera is an extinct genus of tetrapod of debated affinities, described on the basis of fossils from the Carboniferous of the Joggins locality in Nova Scotia, Canada. It was originally described as an undetermined lepospondyl and subsequently classified as a microsaur within the family Tuditanidae. A study published in 2020 found that specimens referred to Asaphestera represented several unrelated species. Steen (1934)'s original species name Asaphestera platyris was retained for a skull which was re-evaluated as the earliest known synapsid. Some authors continue to support a microsaur classification.

The type species of Asaphestera is Asaphestera platyris, named by Steen (1934) based on three skulls. Carroll & Gaskill (1978) noted that one of the skulls was briefly named as the species "Hylerpeton" intermedium by Dawson (1894), though it is no longer consider related to the genus Hylerpeton. According to Dawson's species name, they renamed Asaphestera platyris to Asaphestera intermedia.

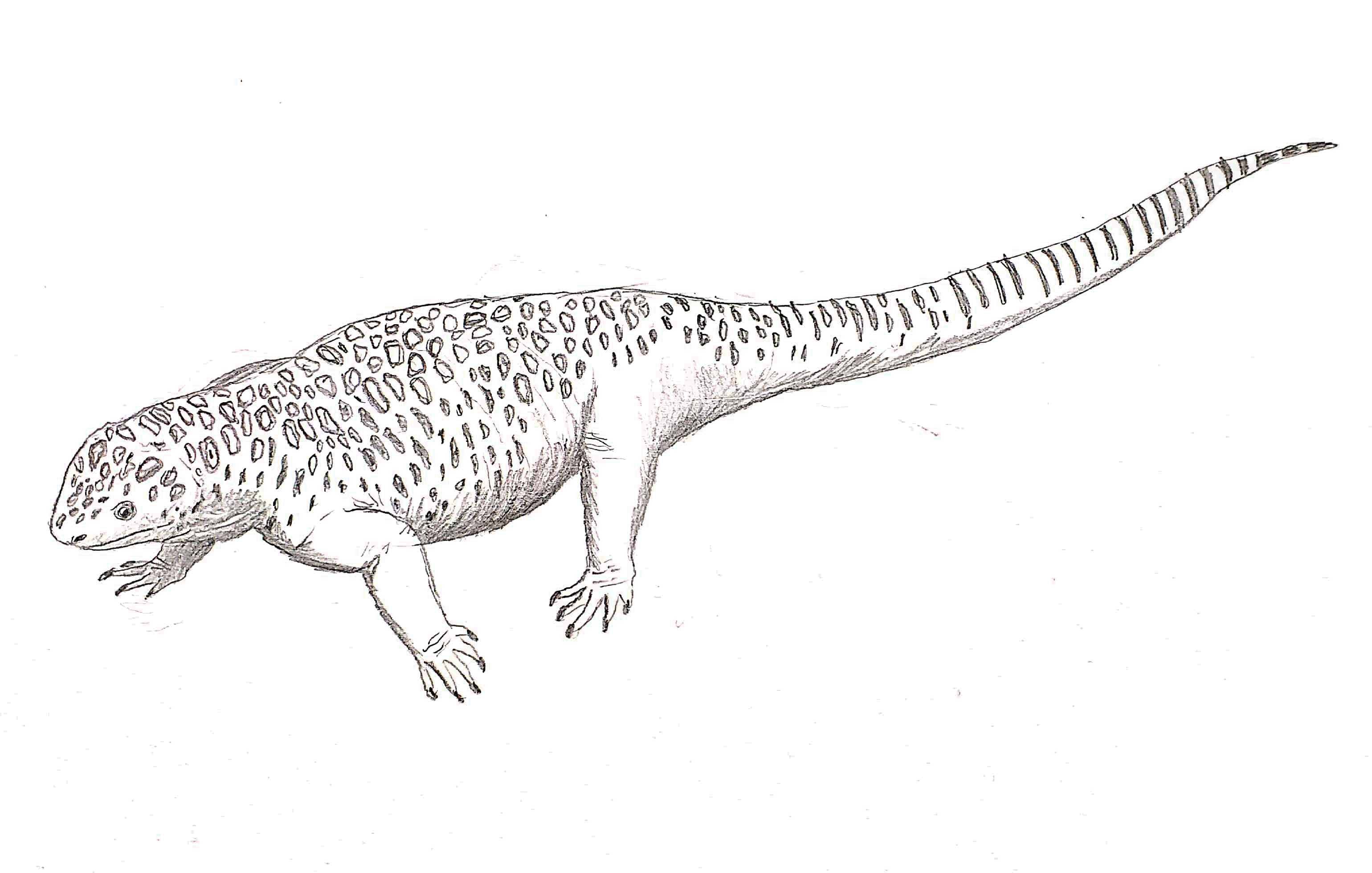
Speculative life restoration

Mann et al. (2020) re-evaluated purported Joggins microsaurs and found several unusual results. One of the skulls assigned the name Asaphestera platyris by Steen appeared to be a valid taxon, but instead of a microsaur it was the oldest known synapsid, possibly an eothyridid. Dawson's "Hylerpeton" intermedium was determined to be an indeterminate tetrapod and a nomen dubium. Additional Asaphestera material was named as a new genus of microsaur, Steenerpeton. Scales are preserved in the type specimen of A. platyris, which are also observed in other early synapsids.

Reisz & Modesto (2025) argued that the holotype was an undiagnostic nomen dubium and a recumbirostran "microsaur" rather than a synapsid, and rejected Mann et al. 2020's finding.
