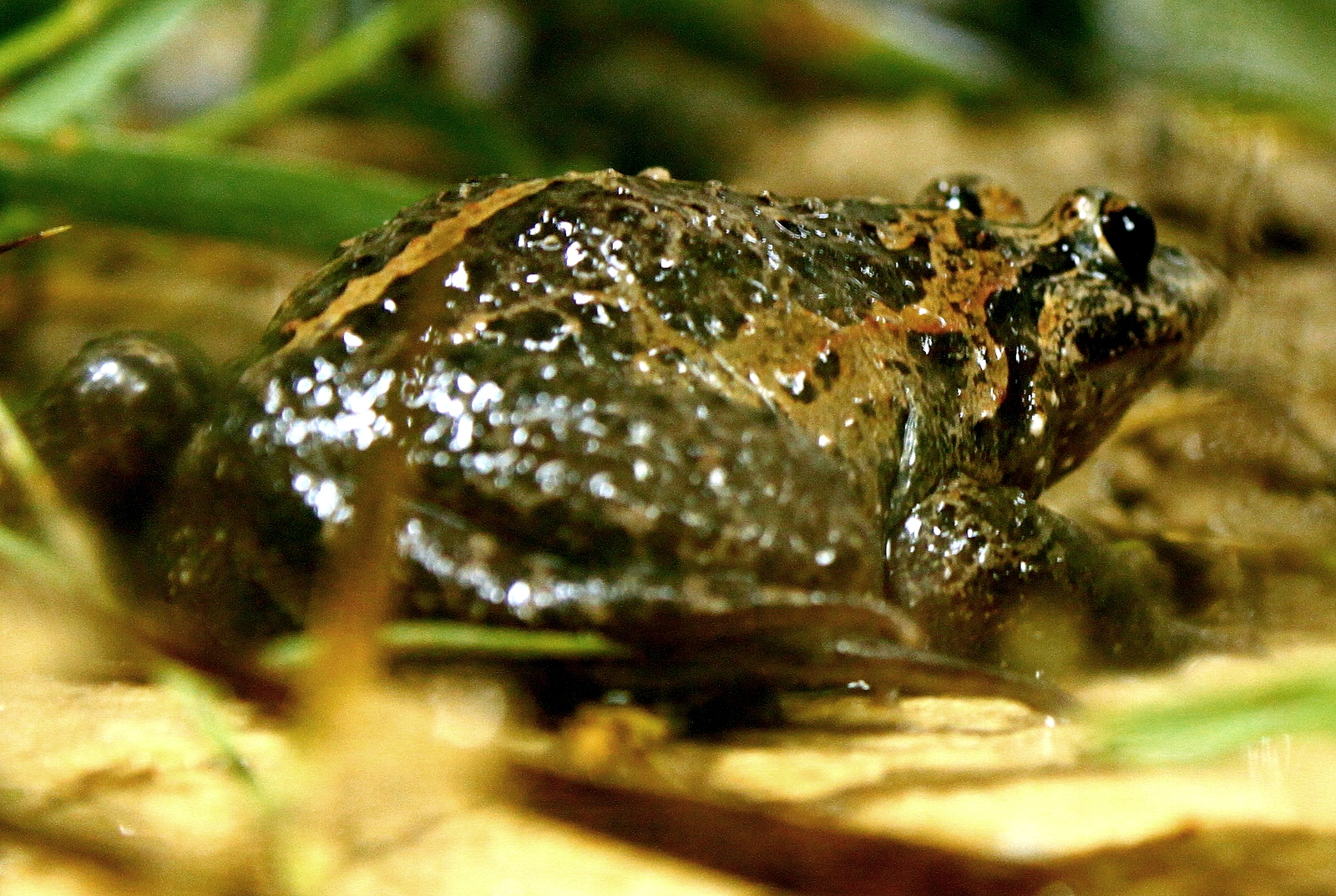
- Latonia nigriventer

Scientific classification
- Kingdom: Animalia
- Phylum: Chordata
- Class: Amphibia
- Order: Anura
- Family: Alytidae
- Genus: Latonia; Meyer, 1843

Type species
- †Latonia seyfriedi Meyer, 1843

Species
- See text

= Latonia (frog) =

Latonia Temporal range: Oligocene–Present

Genus of amphibians

Latonia is a genus of frogs in the family Alytidae (formerly Discoglossidae). It contains only one extant species, the Hula painted frog which is endemic to Israel and was originally classified in the genus Discoglossus, though several fossil species are known from the Paleogene and Neogene periods (Upper Oligocene to Early Pleistocene) spanning across Europe.

== Species ==
Binomial name and author	Common name
Latonia nigriventer Mendelssohn & Steinitz, 1943	Hula painted frog
†Latonia seyfriedi von Meyer, 1843
†Latonia gigantea (Lartet, 1851)
†Latonia vertaizoni (Friant, 1944)
†Latonia ragei Hossini 1993

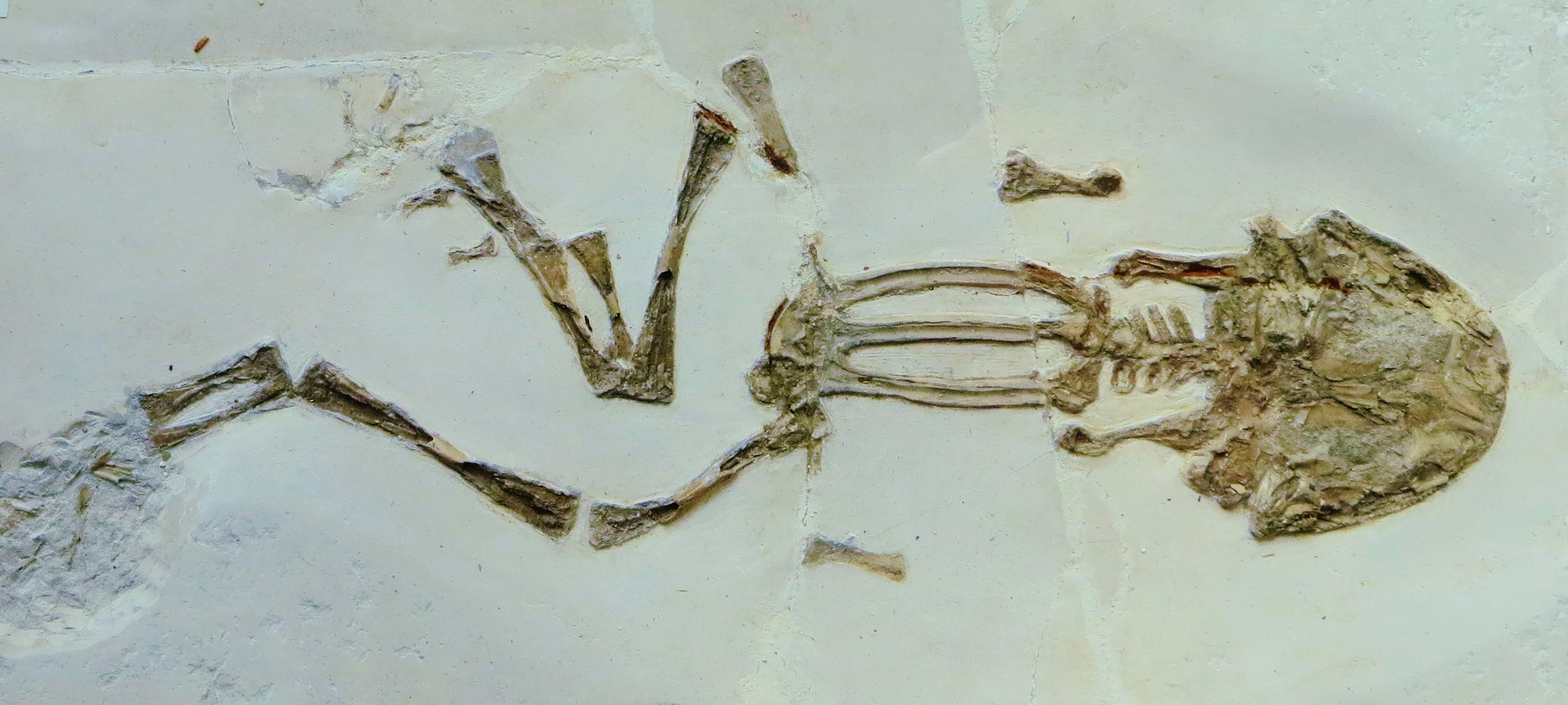
L. seyfriedi fossil
