= Sillerpeton =

Sillerpeton Temporal range: Early Permian

Scientific classification
- Kingdom: Animalia
- Phylum: Chordata
- Order: †Aistopoda
- Family: †Phlegethontiidae
- Genus: †Sillerpeton; Lund, 1978
- Species: †S. permianum

Binomial name
- †Sillerpeton permianum Lund, 1978

Extinct genus of tetrapodomorphs

Sillerpeton is an extinct genus of aïstopod tetrapodomorphs within the family Phlegethontiidae. It contains a single species, Sillerpeton permianum, which is based on braincases and vertebrae from the Early Permian Richards Spur locality of Oklahoma.

== See also ==
- List of prehistoric amphibian genera
