= Fayella =

Fayella Temporal range: Early Permian, 271 Ma

Scientific classification
- Domain: Eukaryota
- Kingdom: Animalia
- Phylum: Chordata
- Order: †Temnospondyli
- Family: †Dissorophidae
- Genus: †Fayella; Olson, 1965

Species
- †F. chickashaensis Olson, 1965 (type)

Extinct genus of amphibians

Fayella is an extinct genus of dubious temnospondyl from the Early Permian (Guadalupian) of Oklahoma.

== Taxonomy ==
The holotype of Fayella chickashaensis, FMNH UR 1004, comprises a brain case with part of basicranium, basipterygoid processes, and part of otic complex. It was found in the Chickasha Formation of Oklahoma. Olson (1972) referred a complete specimen (UCLA VP 3066) to Fayella based on cranial similarities. However, Gee et al. (2018) declared Fayella a nomen dubium, assigning it to Temnospondyli indeterminate and coining Nooxobeia for UCLA VP 3066, which is definitely a dissorophid.

== See also ==
- Prehistoric amphibian
- List of prehistoric amphibians
