= Hylerpeton =

Hylerpeton Temporal range: Bashkirian, 318–314 Ma

Scientific classification
- Domain: Eukaryota
- Kingdom: Animalia
- Phylum: Chordata
- Family: †Gymnarthridae
- Genus: †Hylerpeton; Owen, 1862

Extinct genus of tetrapods

Hylerpeton is an extinct genus of microsaurian tetrapods belonging to the family Gymnarthridae from the late Carboniferous period.

The nominal species "Hylerpeton" longidentatum Dawson, 1876 was considered possibly non-microsaurian by Steen (1934) and Carroll (1966), and was eventually recognized as a member of Aistopoda and renamed Andersonerpeton longidentatum by Pardo and Mann (2018) as the type species of a new genus.
