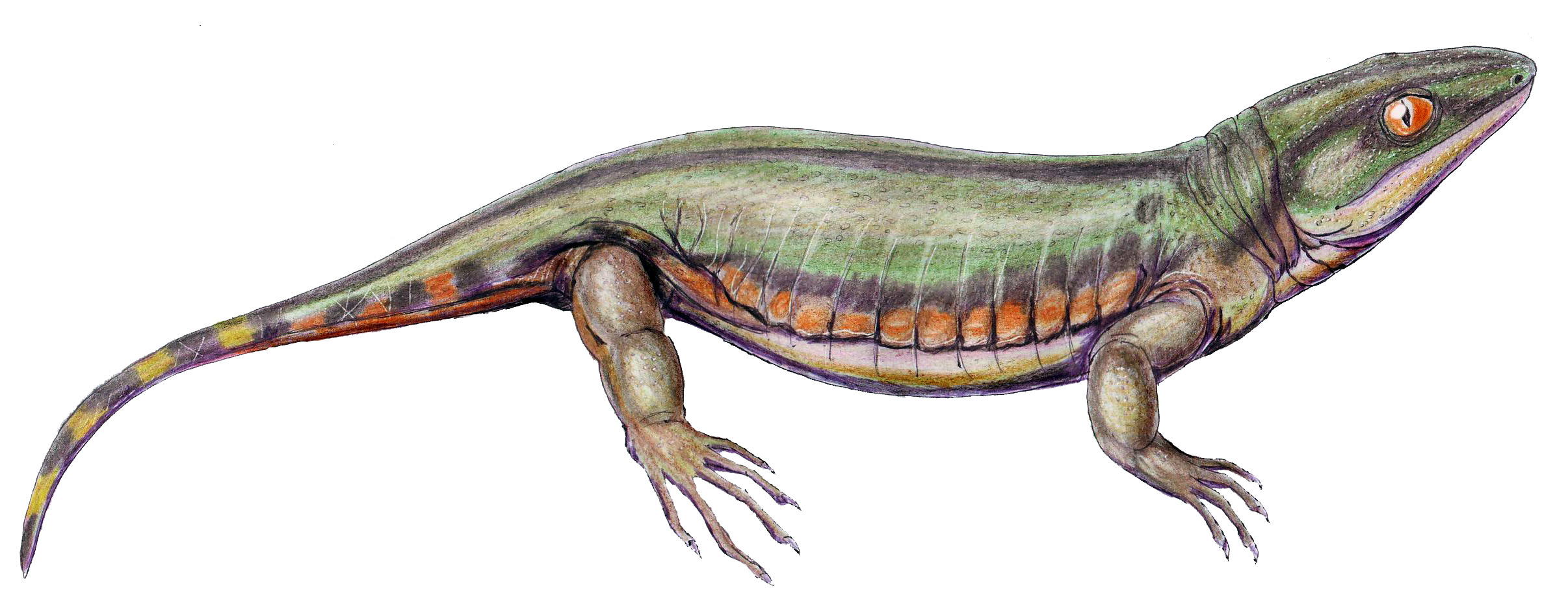

Scientific classification
- Domain: Eukaryota
- Kingdom: Animalia
- Phylum: Chordata
- Family: †Tuditanidae
- Genus: †Tuditanus; Cope, 1871

= Tuditanus =

Tuditanus Temporal range: Late Carboniferous

Extinct genus of tetrapods

Tuditanus is an extinct genus of tuditanid microsaur from the Carboniferous, ~ 306 Ma ago. It was of small size, reaching a length of about 24 cm.

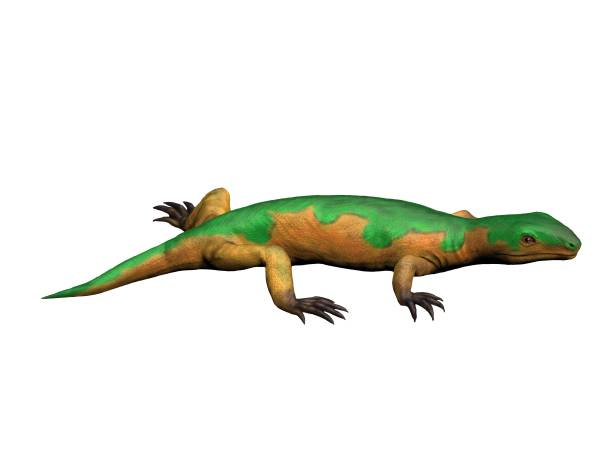
Life reconstruction of Tuditanus punctulatus
