= Kounov (Rakovník District) =

- Municipality
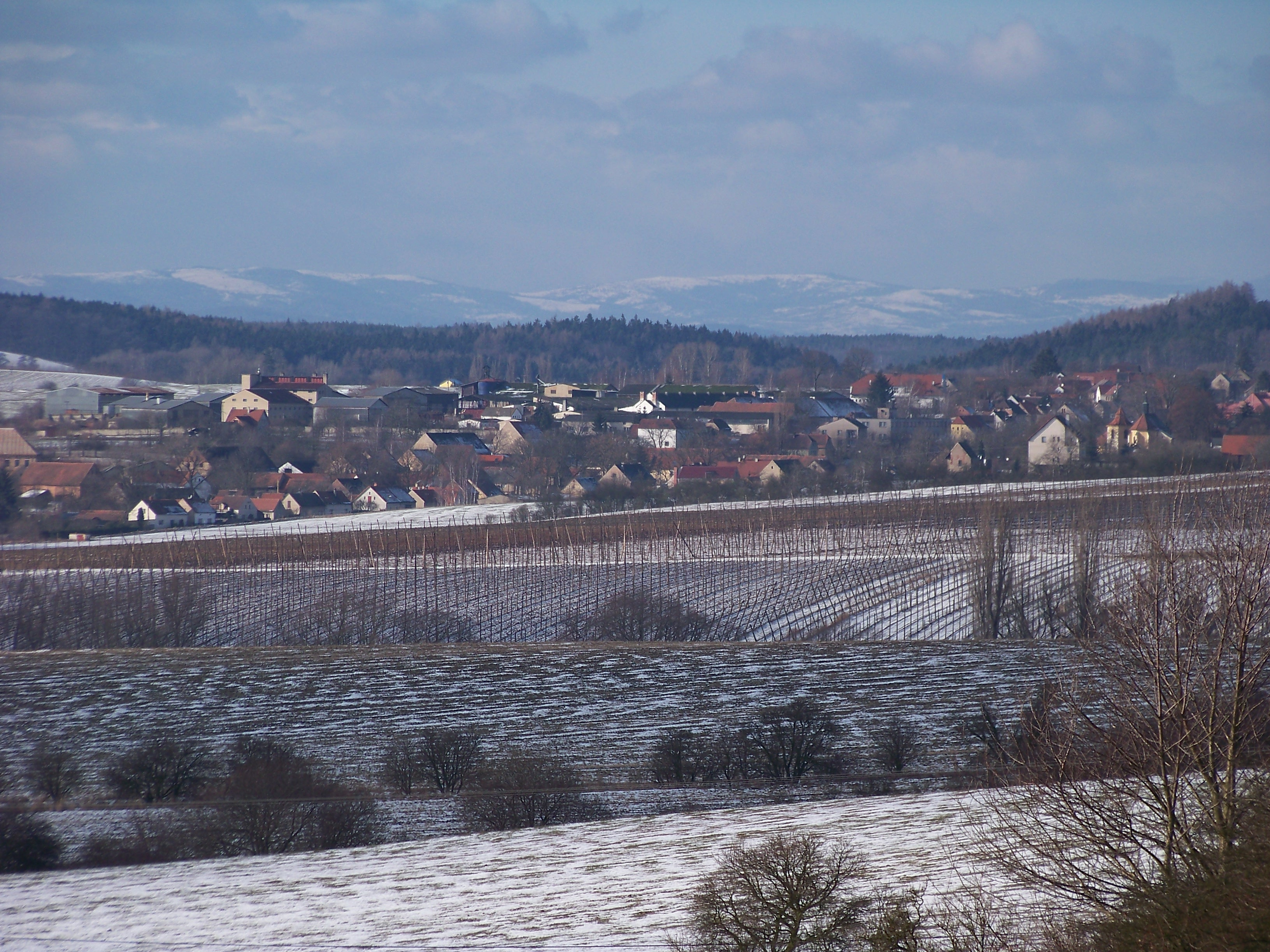
- General view

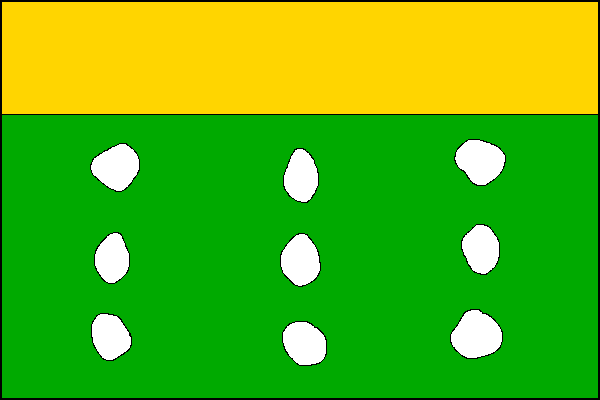
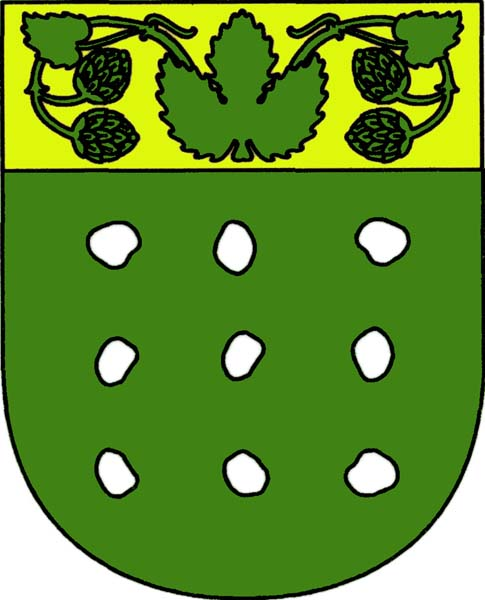
- Flag Coat of arms

- Location in the Czech Republic
- Coordinates: 50°12′47″N 13°40′31″E
- Country: Czech Republic
- Region: Central Bohemian
- District: Rakovník
- First mentioned: 1228

Area
  - Total: 8.58 km^{2} (3.31 sq mi)
- Elevation: 411 m (1,348 ft)

Population (2026-01-01)
  - Total: 556
  - Density: 64.8/km^{2} (168/sq mi)
- Time zone: UTC+1 (CET)
  - Summer (DST): UTC+2 (CEST)
- Postal code: 270 06
- Website: www.obec-kounov.cz

Kounov is a municipality and village in Rakovník District in the Central Bohemian Region of the Czech Republic. It has about 600 inhabitants.

== Demographics ==
Historical population
Year	Pop.	±%
1869	905	—
1880	1,028	+13.6%
1890	1,032	+0.4%
1900	959	−7.1%
1910	912	−4.9%
1921	980	+7.5%
1930	1,084	+10.6%
1950	709	−34.6%
1961	700	−1.3%
1970	598	−14.6%
1980	577	−3.5%
1991	487	−15.6%
2001	489	+0.4%
2011	500	+2.2%
2021	512	+2.4%
Source: Censuses
