= Fish fin =

Bony skin-covered spines or rays protruding from the body of a fish

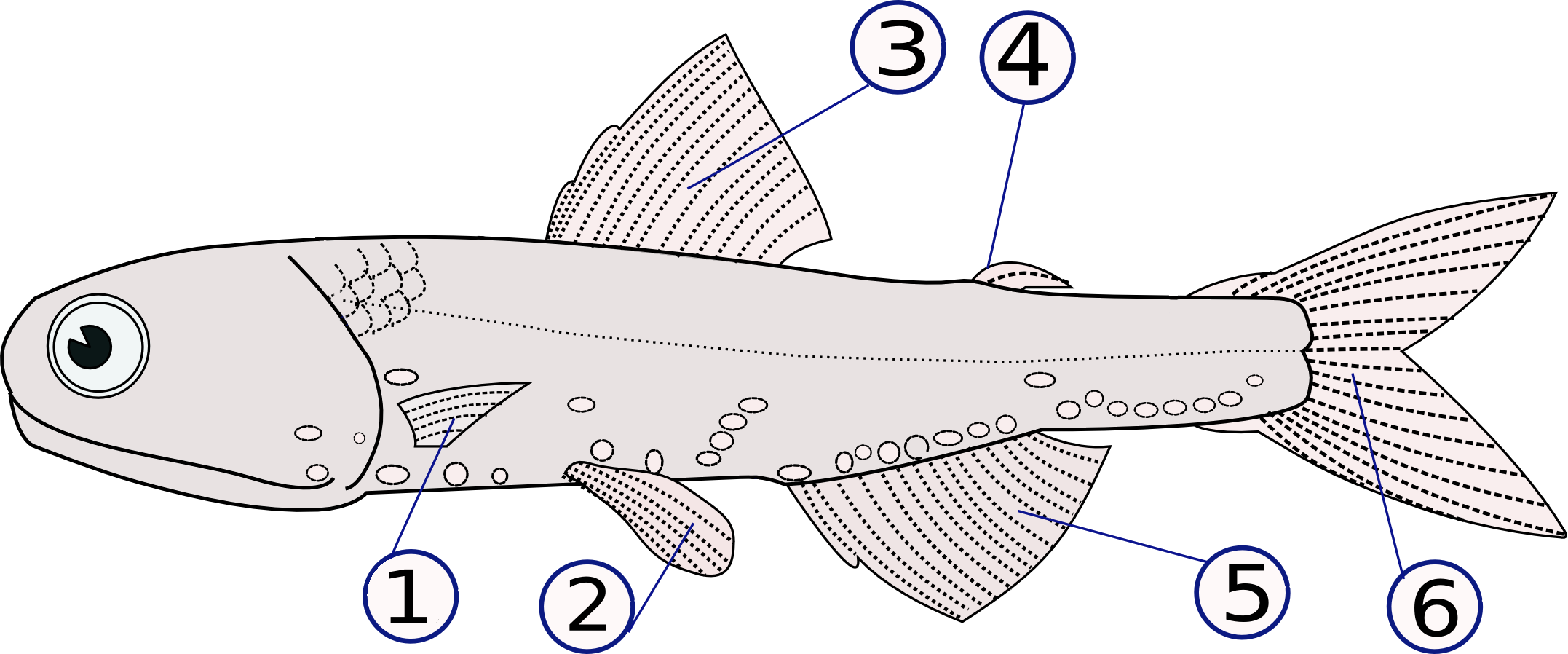
Ray fins on a teleost fish, Hector's lanternfish (1) pectoral fins (paired), (2) pelvic fins (paired), (3) dorsal fin, (4) adipose fin, (5) anal fin, (6) caudal (tail) fin

Fins are moving appendages protruding from the body of fish that interact with water to generate thrust and lift, which help the fish swim. Apart from the tail or caudal fin, fish fins have no direct articulations with the axial skeleton and are attached to the core only via muscles and ligaments.

Fish fins are highly distinctive anatomical features with varying internal structures among different clades: in ray-finned fish (Actinopterygii), fins are mainly composed of spreading bony spines or "rays" covered by a thin stretch of scaleless skin, resembling a folding fan; in lobe-finned fish (Sarcopterygii) such as coelacanths and lungfish, fins are short rays based around a muscular central bud internally supported by a jointed appendicular skeleton; in cartilaginous fish (Chondrichthyes) and jawless fish (Agnatha), fins are fleshy "flippers" supported by a cartilaginous skeleton. The limbs of tetrapods, a mostly terrestrial clade evolved from freshwater lobe-finned fish, are homologous to the pectoral and pelvic fins of all jawed fish.

Fins at different locations of the fish body serve different functions, and are divided into two groups: the midsagittal unpaired fins and the more laterally located paired fins. Unpaired fins are predominantly associated with generating linear acceleration via oscillating propulsion, as well as providing directional stability; while paired fins are used for generating paddling acceleration, deceleration, and differential thrust or lift for turning, surfacing or diving and rolling. Fins can also be used for other locomotions other than swimming, for example, flying fish use pectoral fins for gliding flight above water surface, and frogfish and many amphibious fishes (e.g. mudskippers) use pectoral and/or pelvic fins for crawling. Fins can also be used for other purposes: remoras and gobies have evolved sucker-like dorsal and pelvic fins for attaching to surfaces and "hitchhiking"; male sharks and mosquitofish use modified pelvic fins known as claspers to deliver semen during mating; thresher sharks use their caudal fin to whip and stun prey; reef stonefish have spines in their dorsal fins that inject venom as an anti-predator defense; anglerfish use the first spine of their dorsal fin like a fishing rod to lure prey; and triggerfish avoid predators by squeezing into coral crevices and using spines in their fins to anchor themselves in place.

== Types of fins ==
Fins can either be paired or unpaired; the pectoral and pelvic fins are paired, whereas the dorsal, anal and caudal fins are unpaired and situated along the midline (median) of the body. The fin origin is the anterior-most location (the "leading edge") where a particular fin inserts into the body, which allows it to articulate.

During evolution, certain fin types may be modified to adapt to different niches: certain species have "lost" certain fins during their evolution (e.g. pelvic fins in swordfish and deep-sea anglerfish, the caudal fin in Molidae), and conversely, additional unpaired fins may have been acquired in some clades (e.g. additional dorsal fins in Gadidae, the adipose fin). In some †Acanthodii ("spiny sharks"), one or more pairs of "intermediate" or "prepelvic" spines are present between the pectoral and pelvic fins, but these are not associated with fins.

Paired fins
Pectoral fins (Arm fins)	The paired pectoral fins are located on each side, usually kept folded just behind the operculum, and are homologous to the forelimbs of quadrupedal tetrapods, the upper limbs of bipedal tetrapods, and the front flippers of secondarily aquatic tetrapods.: A peculiar function of pectoral fins, highly developed in some fish, is the creation of the dynamic lifting force that assists some fish, such as sharks, in maintaining depth and also enables the "flight" for flying fish; In many fish, the pectoral fins aid in walking, especially in the lobe-like fins of some anglerfish and in the mudskipper (see also walking fish); Certain rays of the pectoral fins may be adapted into finger-like projections, such as in sea robins and flying gurnards; In skates and rays, the pectoral fins are used for propulsion (rajiform propulsion); The "horns" of manta rays and their relatives are called cephalic fins; this is actually a modification of the anterior portion of the pectoral fin
Pelvic / Ventral fins (Belly fins)	The paired pelvic or ventral fins are the belly fins (from Latin venter 'belly') are typically located ventrally below and behind the pectoral fins, although in many fish families they may be positioned in front of the pectoral fins (e.g. cods). They are homologous to the hindlimbs of quadrupedal tetrapods or the lower limbs of bipedal tetrapods. The pelvic fin assists the fish in going up or down through the water, turning sharply, and stopping quickly.: In gobies, the pelvic fins are often fused into a single sucker disk. This can be used to attach to objects; Pelvic fins can take many positions along the ventral surface of the fish. The ancestral abdominal position is seen in (for example) the minnows; the thoracic position in sunfish; and the jugular position, when the pelvics are anterior to the pectoral fins, as seen in the burbot

Median/Unpaired fins
Dorsal fin (Spinal fins)	Dorsal fin of a shark Dorsal fin of a chub (Squalius cephalus)	The dorsal fins are located on the back. A fish can have up to three dorsal fins. The dorsal fins serve to protect the fish against rolling, and assist it in sudden turns and stops.: In anglerfish, the anterior of the dorsal fin is modified into an illicium and esca, a biological equivalent to a fishing rod and lure; Gymnarchus uses only its dorsal fin for propulsion; Boxfish, pufferfish and ocean sunfish use their dorsal fin in combination with their anal fin for propulsion (tetraodontiform propulsion)	Pterygiophores are the basal elements of the dorsal and anal fins which allows for their articulation; they connect the median fins to the body. These elements may either be cartilagenous or ossified. There are up to three series of pterygiophores; from farthest to closest to the fin, they are the proximal, median, and distal pterygiophores. In certain species there are only the proximal and distal pterygiophore series. The proximal series may alternatively be called basals (especially if they contact the vertebrae), interneurals (for the dorsal series) or interhaemals (for the anal series).
Anal/cloacal fin		The anal/cloacal fin is located on the ventral surface behind the anus/cloaca.: Most fish use their anal fin to stabilize while swimming; Knifefish use their anal fins for thrust (gymnotiform propulsion); Boxfish, pufferfish and ocean sunfish use their anal fin in combination with their dorsal fin for propulsion (tetraodontiform propulsion)	
Adipose fin	Adipose fin of a trout	The adipose fin is a soft, fleshy fin found on the back behind the dorsal fin and just forward of the caudal fin. It is absent in many fish families, but found in nine of the 31 euteleostean orders (Percopsiformes, Myctophiformes, Aulopiformes, Stomiiformes, Salmoniformes, Osmeriformes, Characiformes, Siluriformes and Argentiniformes). Famous representatives of these orders are salmon, characids and catfish. The function of the adipose fin is something of a mystery. It is frequently clipped off to mark hatchery-raised fish, though data from 2005 showed that trout with their adipose fin removed have an 8% higher tailbeat frequency. Additional information released in 2011 has suggested that the fin may be vital for the detection of, and response to, stimuli such as touch, sound and changes in pressure. Canadian researchers identified a neural network in the fin, indicating that it likely has a sensory function, but are still not sure exactly what the consequences of removing it are. A comparative study in 2013 indicates the adipose fin can develop in two different ways. One is the salmoniform-type way, where the adipose fin develops from the larval-fin fold at the same time and in the same direct manner as the other median fins. The other is the characiform-type way, where the adipose fin develops late after the larval-fin fold has diminished and the other median fins have developed. They claim the existence of the characiform-type of development suggests the adipose fin is not "just a larval fin fold remainder" and is inconsistent with the view that the adipose fin lacks function. Research published in 2014 indicates that the adipose fin has evolved repeatedly in separate lineages.	
Caudal fin (Tail fin)	Heterocercal caudal fin (A) Homocercal caudal fin (C)	The caudal fin is the tail fin (from the Latin cauda meaning tail), located at the end of the caudal peduncle. It is used for propulsion in most taxa (see also body-caudal fin locomotion). The tail fin is supported by the vertebrae of the axial skeleton and pterygiophores (radials). Depending on the relationship with the axial skeleton, four types of caudal fins (A-D) are distinguished: (A) - Heterocercal means the vertebrae extend into the upper lobe of the tail, often making it longer than the lower lobe (as in sharks, †Placodermi, most stem Actinopterygii, and sturgeons and paddlefish). However, the external shape of heterocercal tail fins can also appear symmetric (e.g. †Birgeria, †Bobasatrania). Heterocercal is the opposite of hypocercal: Hypocercal, also known as reversed heterocercal, means that the vertebrae extend into the lower lobe of the tail, making it longer than the upper lobe (as in the †Anaspida). It is the opposite of heterocercal.; Hemiheterocercal refers to a condition that is intermediate between heterocercal and homocercal (see below), where the vertebrae do not extend to the tip of the upper lobe (e.g. in stem Neopterygii); (B) - Protocercal means the vertebrae extend to the tip of the tail and the tail is symmetrical but not expanded (as in the first fishes and the cyclostomes, and a more primitive precursor in lancelets) (C) - Homocercal where the fin usually appears superficially symmetric but in fact the vertebrae extend for a very short distance into the upper lobe of the fin. Homocercal caudal fins can, however, also appear asymmetric (e.g. blue flying fish). Most modern fishes (teleosts) have a homocercal tail. These come in a variety of shapes, and can appear: rounded or pointed (e.g. round goby); truncated, ending in a more-or-less vertical edge (e.g. trout); emarginate, ending with a slight inward curve (e.g. Eurasian carp); forked, ending in two prongs (e.g. catla); lunate or shaped like a crescent moon (e.g. swordfish); (D) - Diphycercal means the vertebrae extend to the tip of the tail and the tail is symmetrical and expanded (as in the bichir, lungfish, lamprey, coelacanths and †Tarrasiiformes). Most Palaeozoic fishes had a diphycercal heterocercal tail.: Abbreviate diphycercal is a diphycercal fin with a short base (†Saurichthyiformes)	
Caudal keel Finlets		Some types of fast-swimming fish have a horizontal caudal keel just forward of the tail fin. Much like the keel of a ship, this is a lateral ridge on the caudal peduncle, usually composed of scutes (see below), that provides stability and support to the caudal fin. There may be a single paired keel, one on each side, or two pairs above and below. Finlets are small fins, generally behind the dorsal and anal fins (in bichirs, there are only finlets on the dorsal surface and no dorsal fin). In some fish such as tuna or sauries, they are rayless, non-retractable, and found between the last dorsal and/or anal fin and the caudal fin.	

== Bony fishes ==
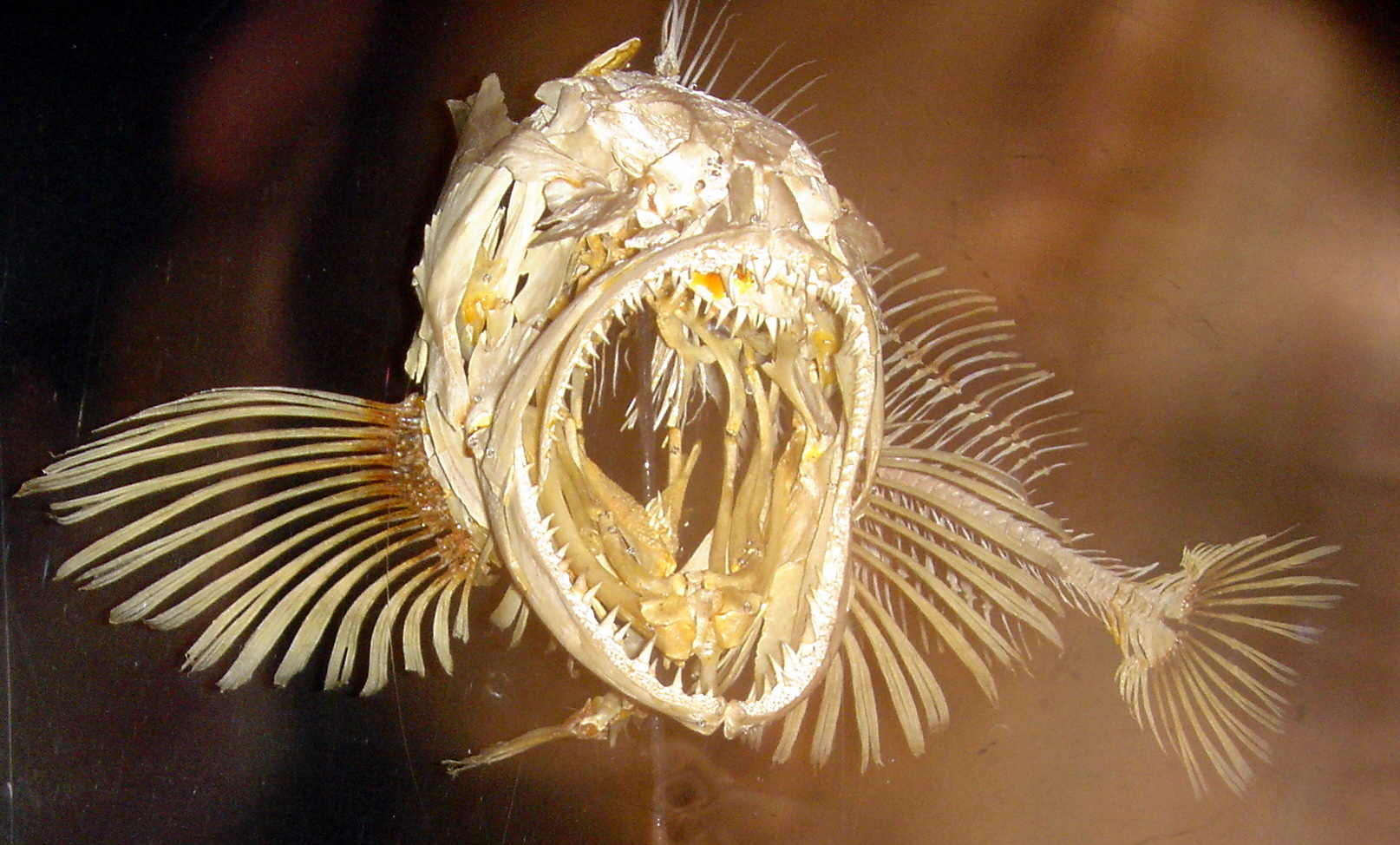
Skeleton of a lingcod, a ray-finned fish

Bony fishes (Actinopterygii and Sarcopterygii) form a taxonomic group called Osteichthyes (or Euteleostomi, which includes also land vertebrates); they have skeletons made of bone mostly, and can be contrasted with cartilaginous fishes (see below), which have skeletons made mainly of cartilage (except for their teeth, fin spines, and denticles).

Bony fishes are divided into ray-finned and lobe-finned fish. Most living fish are ray-finned, an extremely diverse and abundant group consisting of over 30,000 species. It is the largest class of vertebrates in existence today, making up more than 50% of species. In the distant past, lobe-finned fish were abundant; however, there are currently only eight species.

Bony fish have fin spines called lepidotrichia or "rays" (due to how the spines spread open). They typically have swim bladders, which allow the fish to alter the relative density of its body and thus the buoyancy, so it can sink or float without having to use the fins to swim up and down. However, swim bladders are absent in many fish, most notably in lungfishes, who have evolved their swim bladders into primitive lungs, which may have a shared evolutionary origin with those of their terrestrial relatives, the tetrapods. Bony fishes also have a pair of opercula that function to draw water across the gills, which help them breathe without needing to swim forward to force the water into the mouth across the gills.

=== Lobe-fins ===
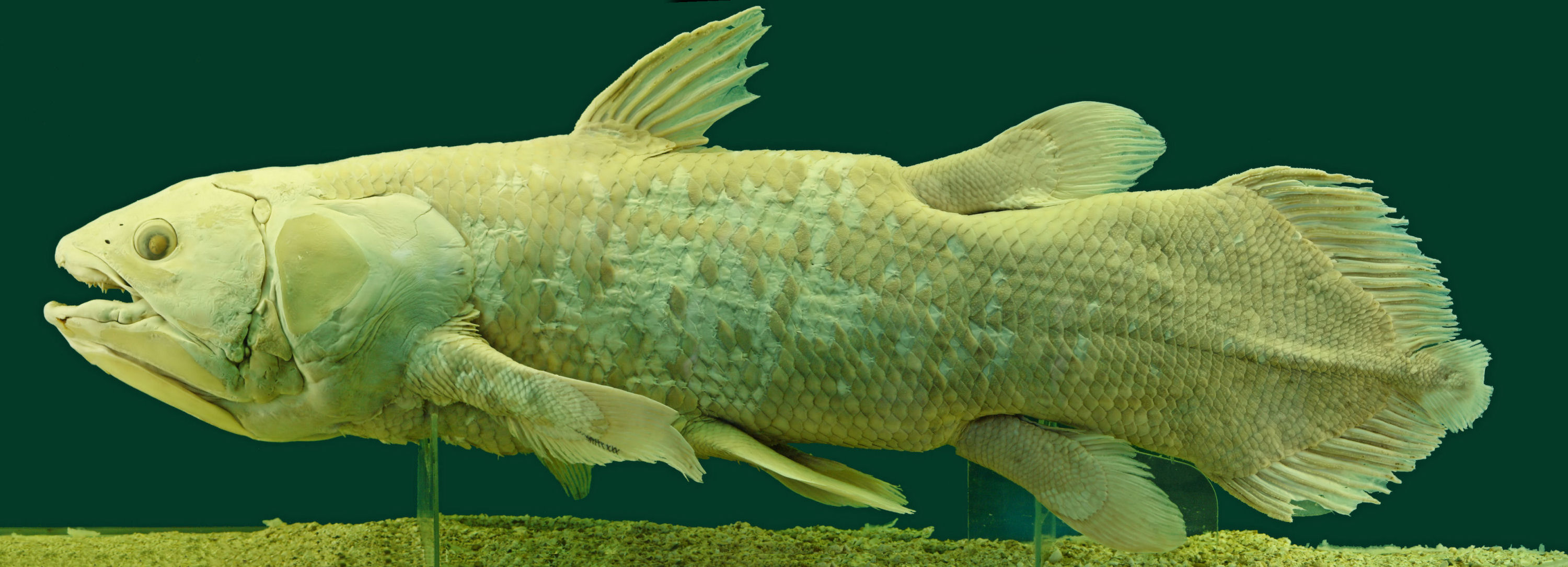
Lobe-finned fishes, like this coelacanth, have fins that are borne on a fleshy, lobe-like, scaly stalk extending from the body. Due to the high number of fins it possesses, the coelacanth has high manoeuvrability and can orient its body in almost any direction in the water.

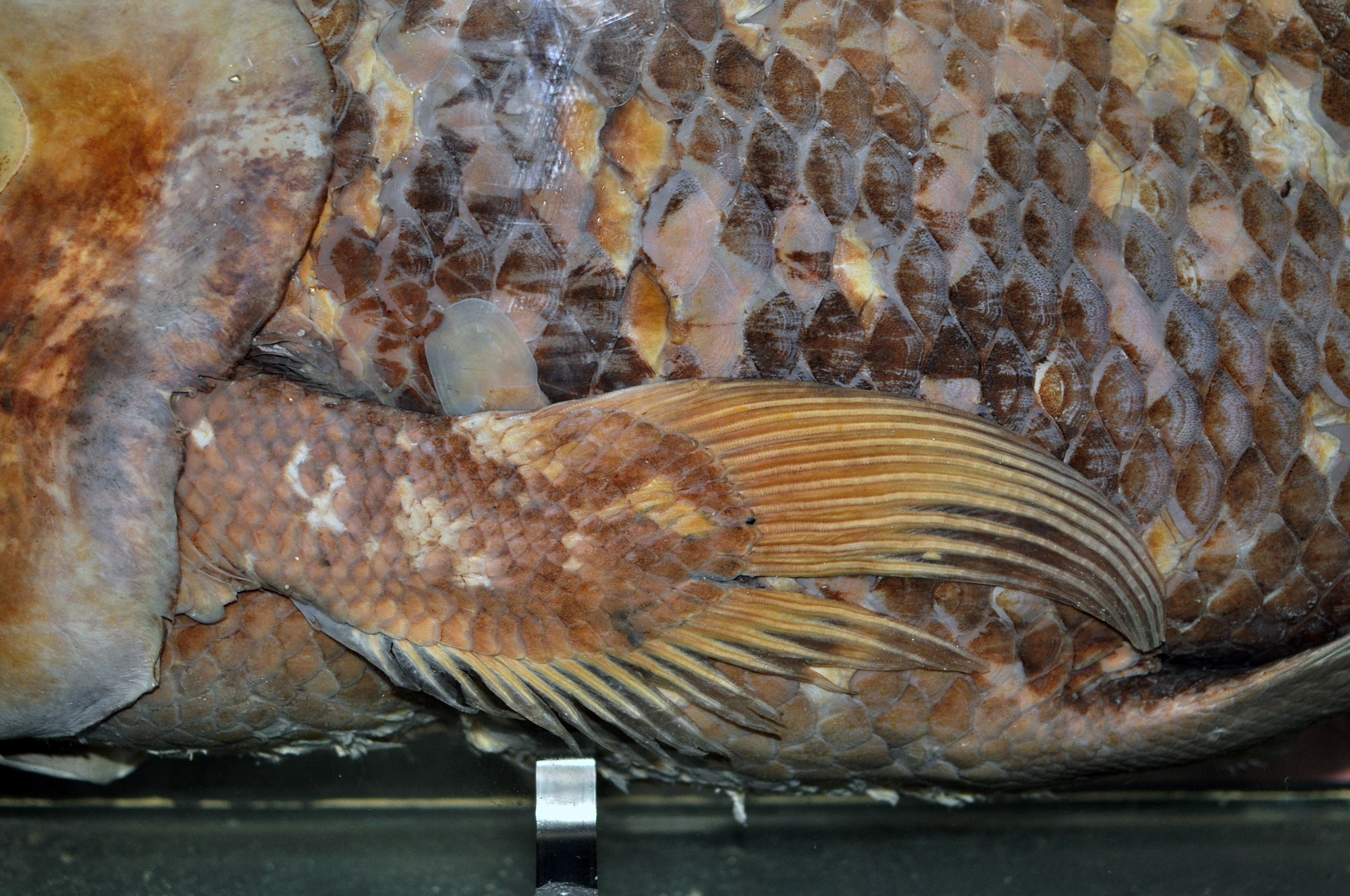
Pectoral fin with fleshy lobe of Latimeria chalumnae (Citron / CC-BY-SA-3.0)

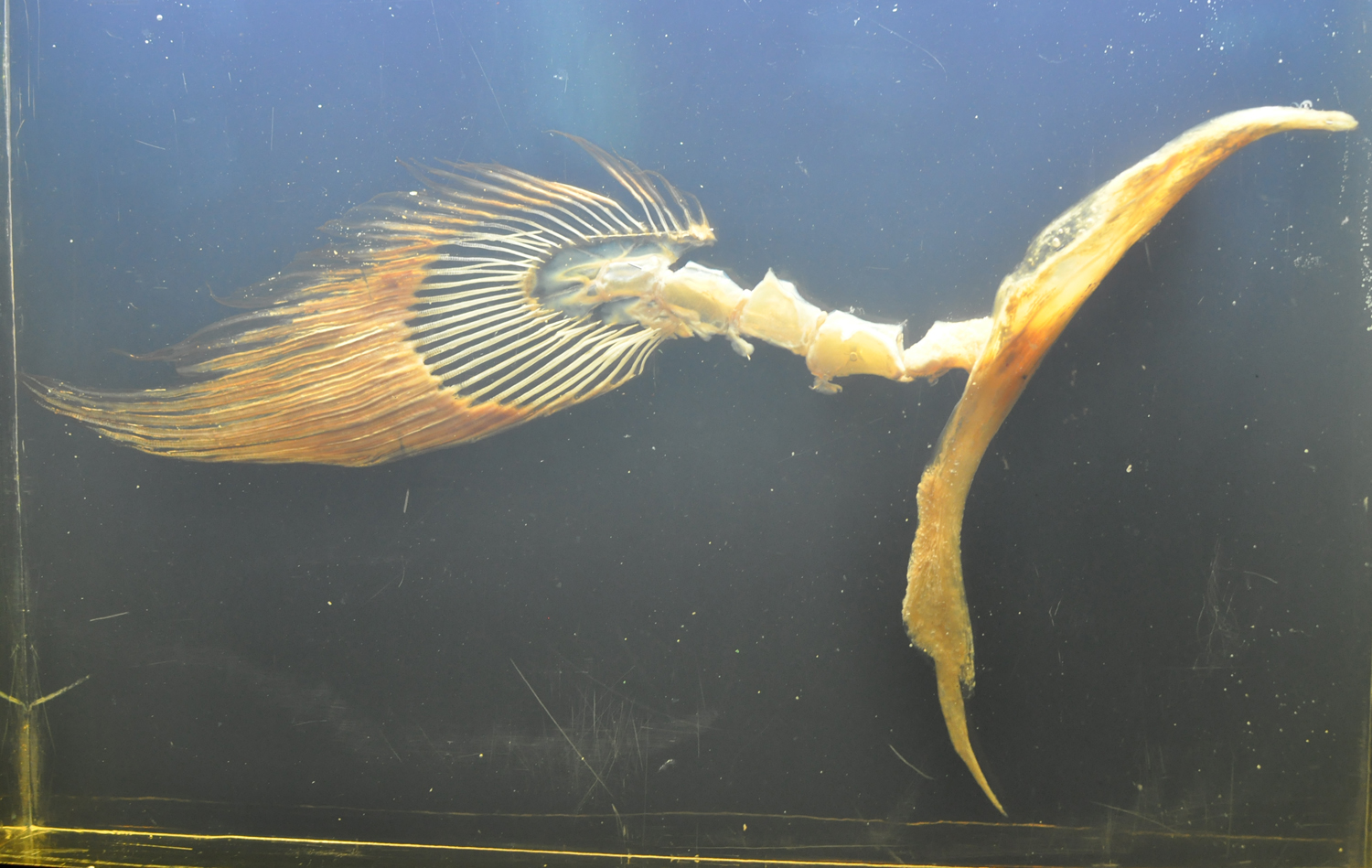
Skeleton of the pectoral girdle and fin of the extant coelacanth Latimeria chalumnae (Citron / CC-BY-SA-3.0)

Lobe-finned fishes form a class of bony fishes called Sarcopterygii. They have fleshy, lobed, paired fins, which are joined to the body by a series of bones. The fins of lobe-finned fish differ from those of all other fish in that each is borne on a fleshy, lobe-like, scaly stalk extending from the body. Pectoral and pelvic fins have articulations resembling those of tetrapod limbs. These fins evolved into legs of the first tetrapod land vertebrates (amphibians) in the Devonian Period. Sarcopterygians also possess two dorsal fins with separate bases, as opposed to the single dorsal fin of most ray-finned fish (except some teleosts). The caudal fin is either heterocercal (only fossil taxa) or diphycercal.

The coelacanth is one type of living lobe-finned fish. Both extant members of this group, the West Indian Ocean coelacanth (Latimeria chalumnae) and the Indonesian coelacanth (Latimeria menadoensis), are found in the genus Latimeria. Coelacanths are thought to have evolved roughly into their current form about 408 million years ago, during the early Devonian.

Locomotion of the coelacanths is unique to their kind. To move around, coelacanths most commonly take advantage of up or downwellings of the current and drift. They use their paired fins to stabilise their movement through the water. While on the ocean floor their paired fins are not used for any kind of movement. Coelacanths can create thrust for quick starts by using their caudal fins. Due to the high number of fins they possess, coelacanths have high manoeuvrability and can orient their bodies in almost any direction in the water. They have been seen doing headstands and swimming belly up. It is thought that their rostral organ helps give the coelacanth electroperception, which aids in their movement around obstacles.

Lungfish are also living lobe-finned fish. They occur in Africa (Protopterus), Australia (Neoceratodus), and South America (Lepidosiren). Lungfish evolved during the Devonian Period. Genetic studies and palaeontological data confirm that lungfish are the closest living relatives of land vertebrates.

Fin arrangement and body shape is relatively conservative in lobe-finned fishes. However, there are a few examples from the fossil record that show aberrant morphologies, such as Allenypterus, Rebellatrix, Foreyia or the tetrapodomorphs.

==== Diversity of fins in lobe-finned fishes ====
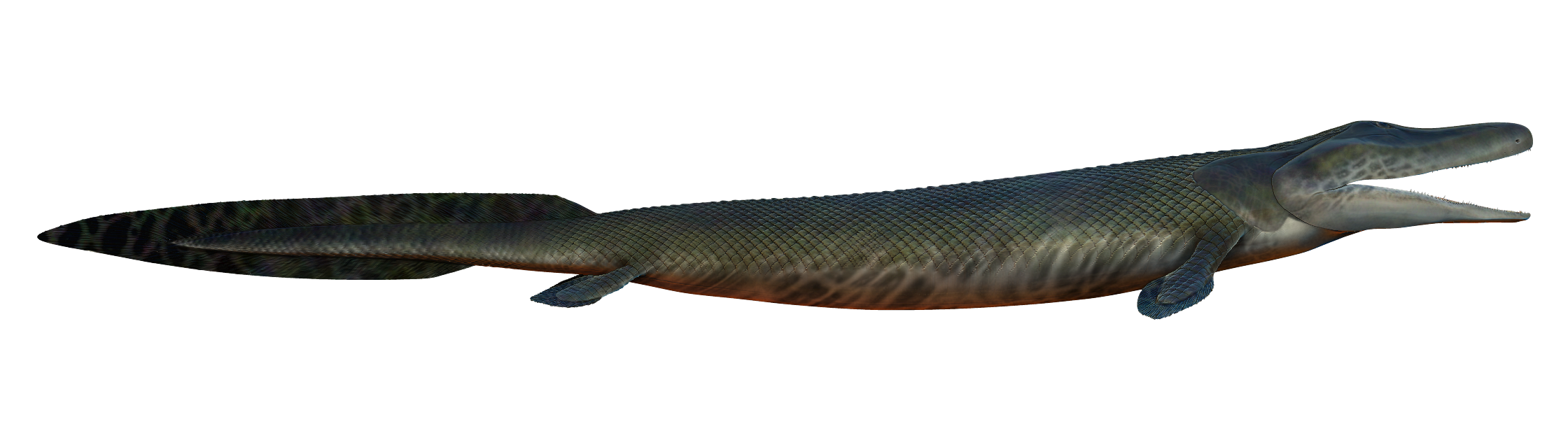
†Tiktaalik roseae

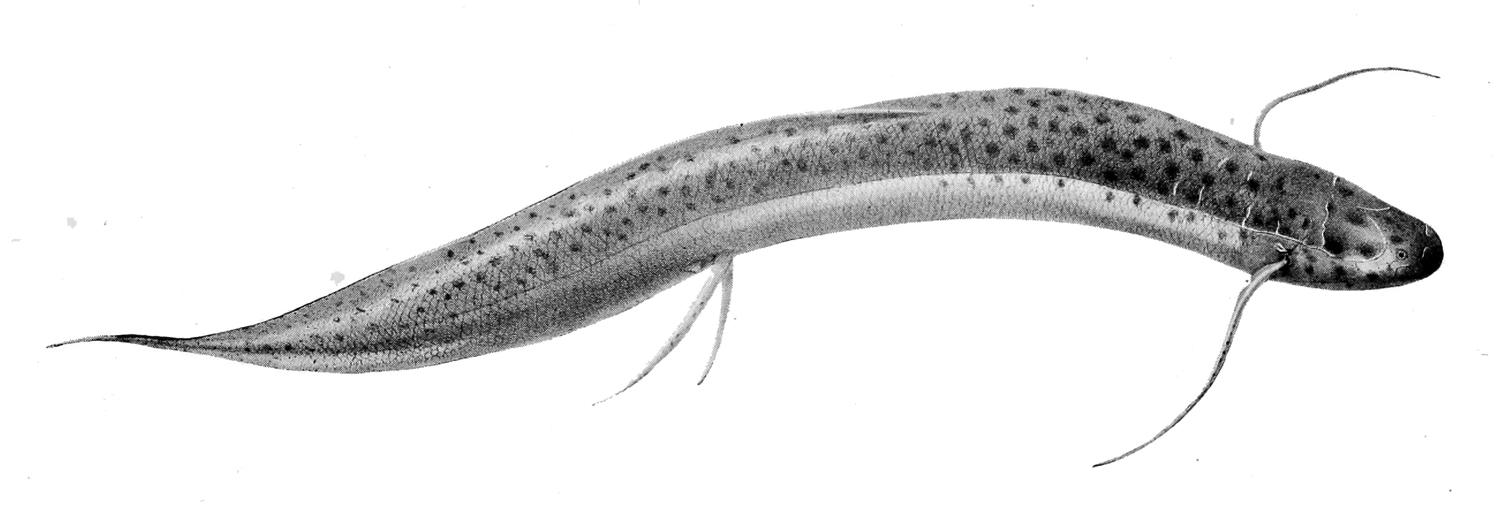
Spotted lungfish Protopterus dolloi

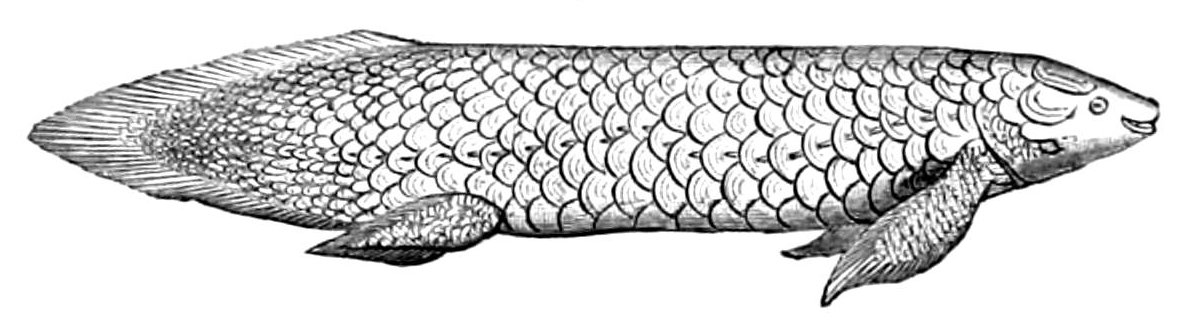
Queensland lungfish Neoceratodus forsteri

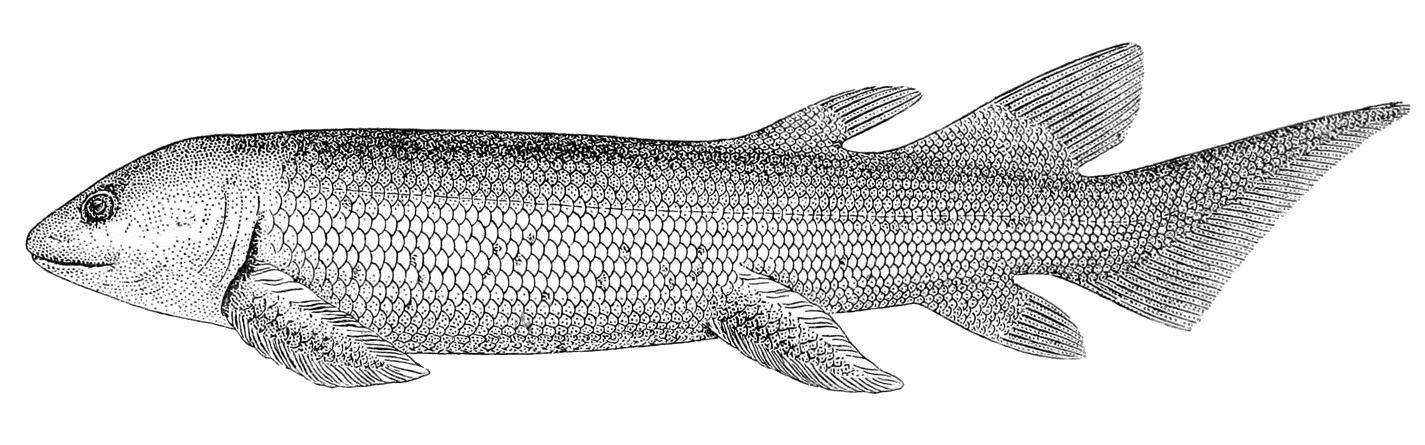
†Dipterus valenciennesi

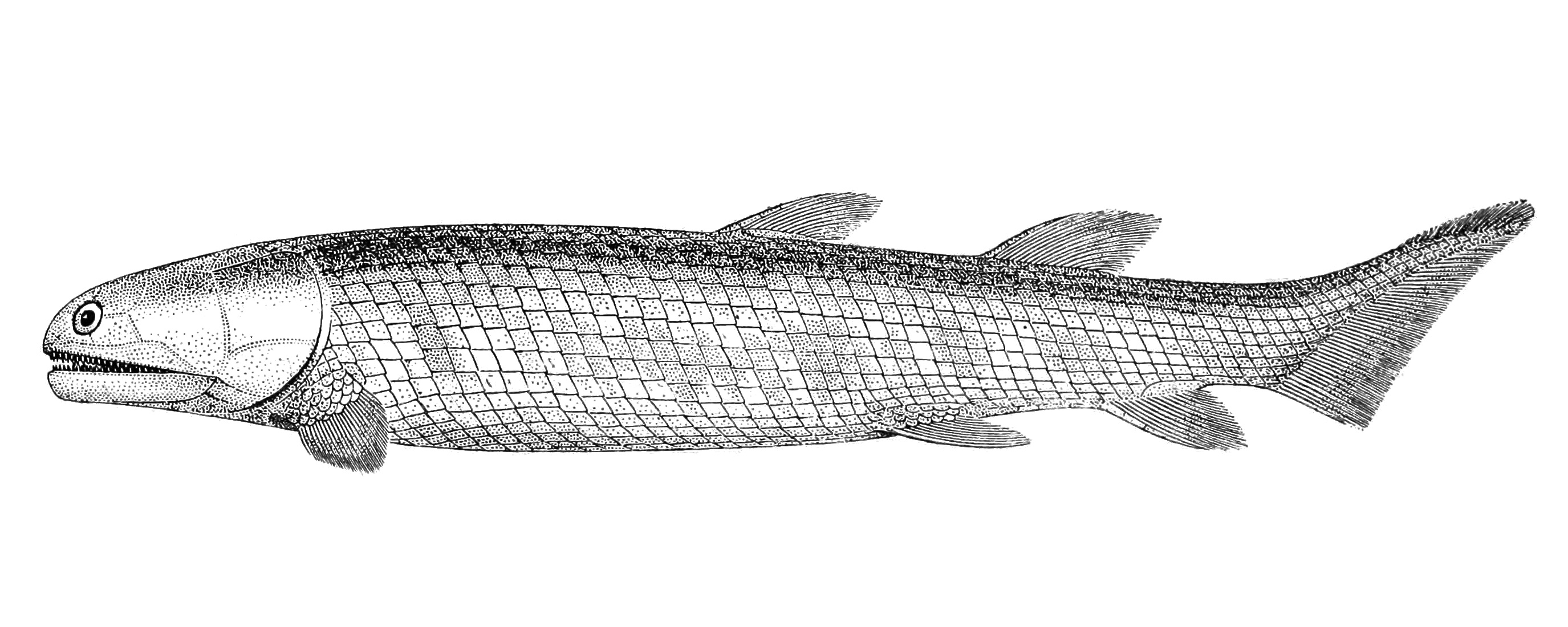
†Osteolepis macrolepidotus

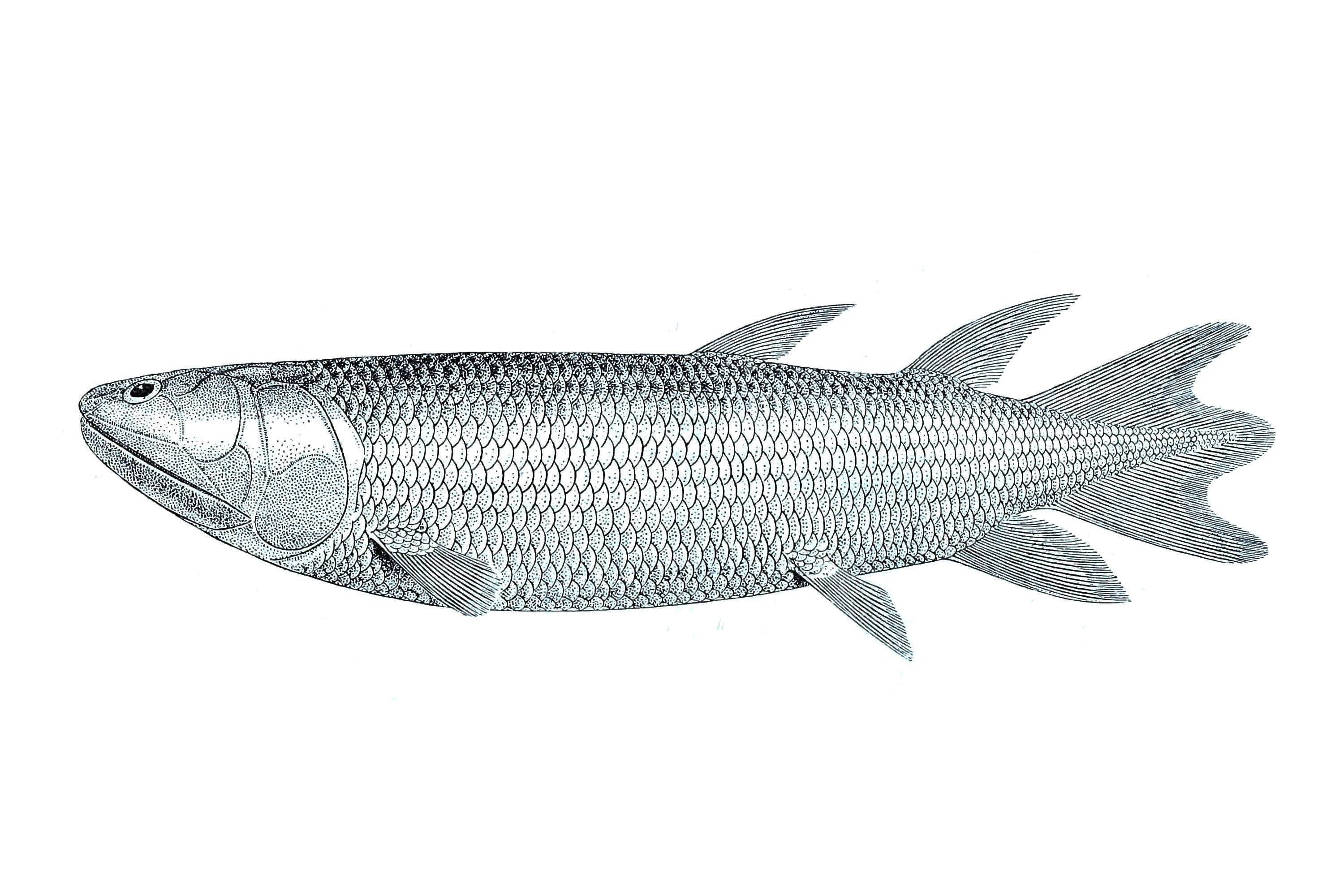
†Eusthenopteron foordi

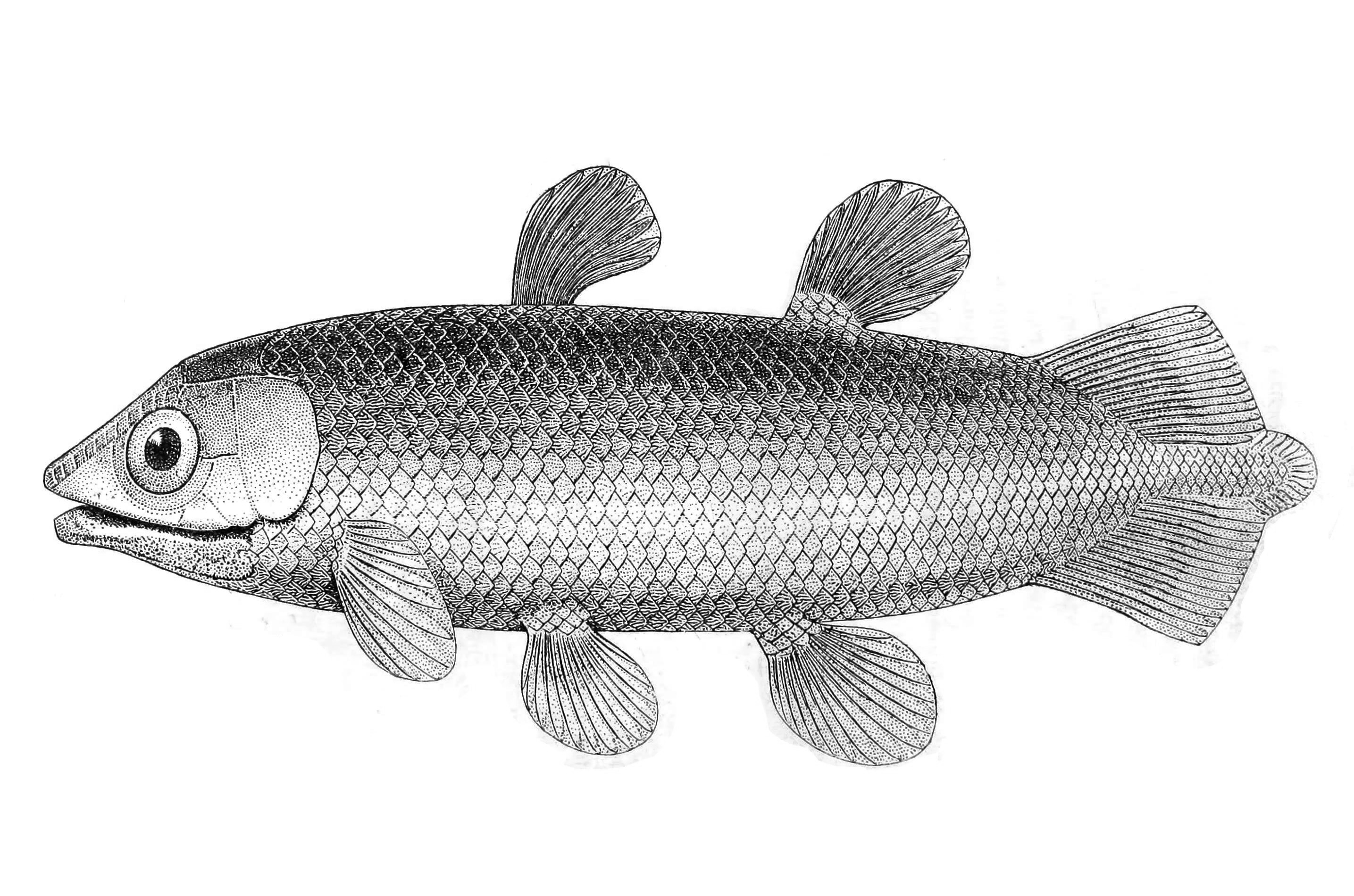
†Undina gulo

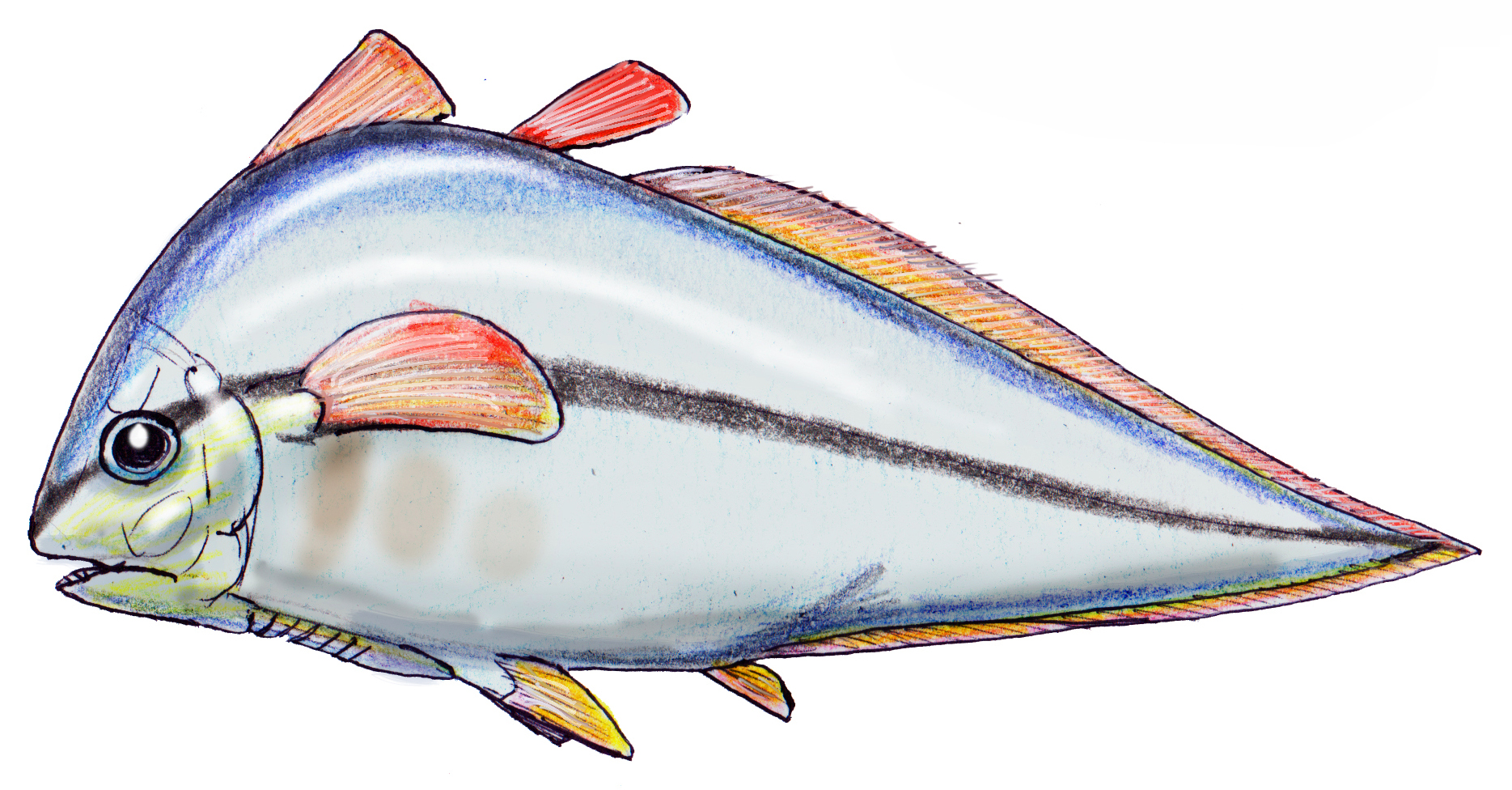
†Allenypterus montanus

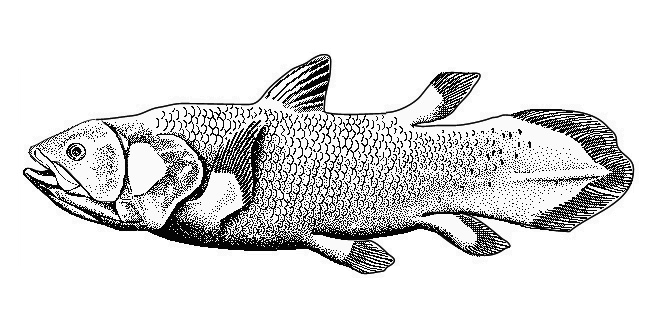
West Indian Ocean coelacanth Latimeria chalumnae

†Mawsonia gigas

=== Ray-fins ===
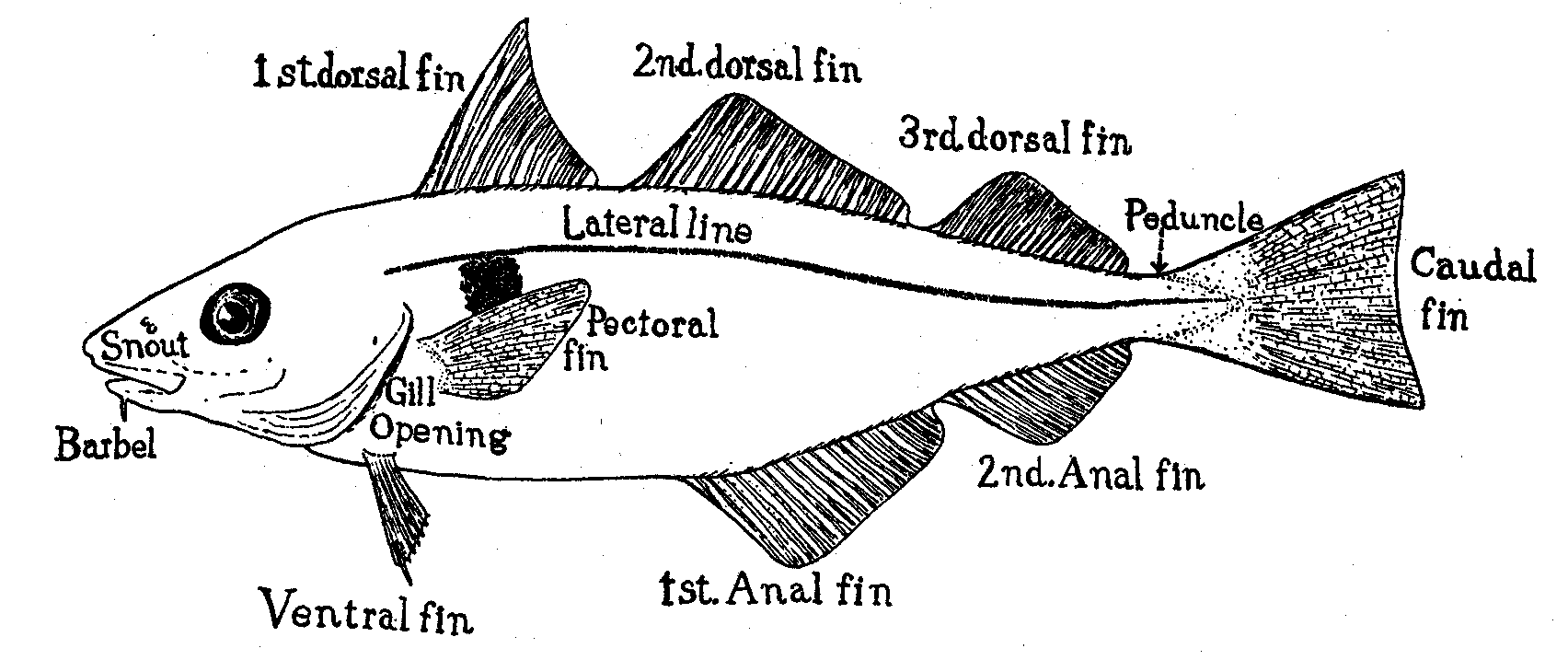
The haddock, a type of cod, is ray-finned. It has three dorsal and two anal fins

Ray-finned fishes form a class of bony fishes called Actinopterygii. Their fins contain spines or rays. A fin may contain only spiny rays, only soft rays, or a combination of both. (Note: In common parlance, "fin ray" may refer to both spiny rays and soft rays, but is sometimes used to specifically signify soft rays.) If both are present, the spiny rays are always anterior. Spines are generally stiff and sharp. Rays are generally soft, flexible, segmented, and may be branched. This segmentation of rays is the main difference that separates them from spines; spines may be flexible in certain species, but they will never be segmented.

Spines have a variety of uses. In catfish, they are used as a form of defence; many catfish have the ability to lock their spines outwards. Triggerfish also use spines to lock themselves in crevices to prevent them being pulled out.

Lepidotrichia are usually composed of bone, but those of early osteichthyans - such as Cheirolepis - also had dentine and enamel. They are segmented and appear as a series of disks stacked one on top of another. They may have been derived from dermal scales. The genetic basis for the formation of the fin rays is thought to be genes coded for the production of certain proteins. It has been suggested that the evolution of the tetrapod limb from lobe-finned fishes is related to the loss of these proteins.

==== Diversity of fins in ray-finned fishes ====
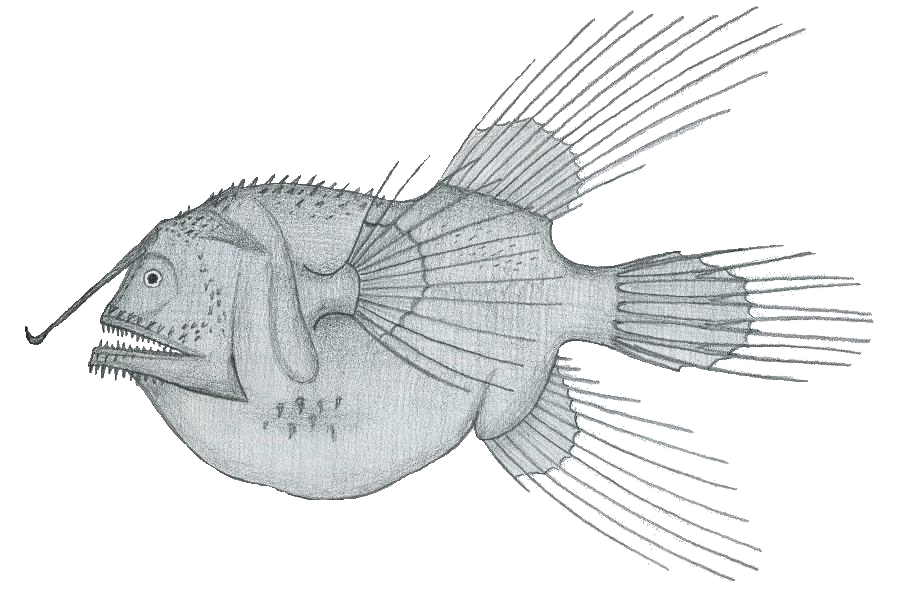
Fanfin angler Caulophryne jordani

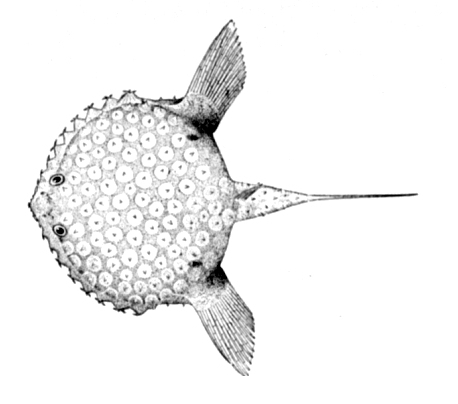
Pancake batfish Halieutichthys aculeatus

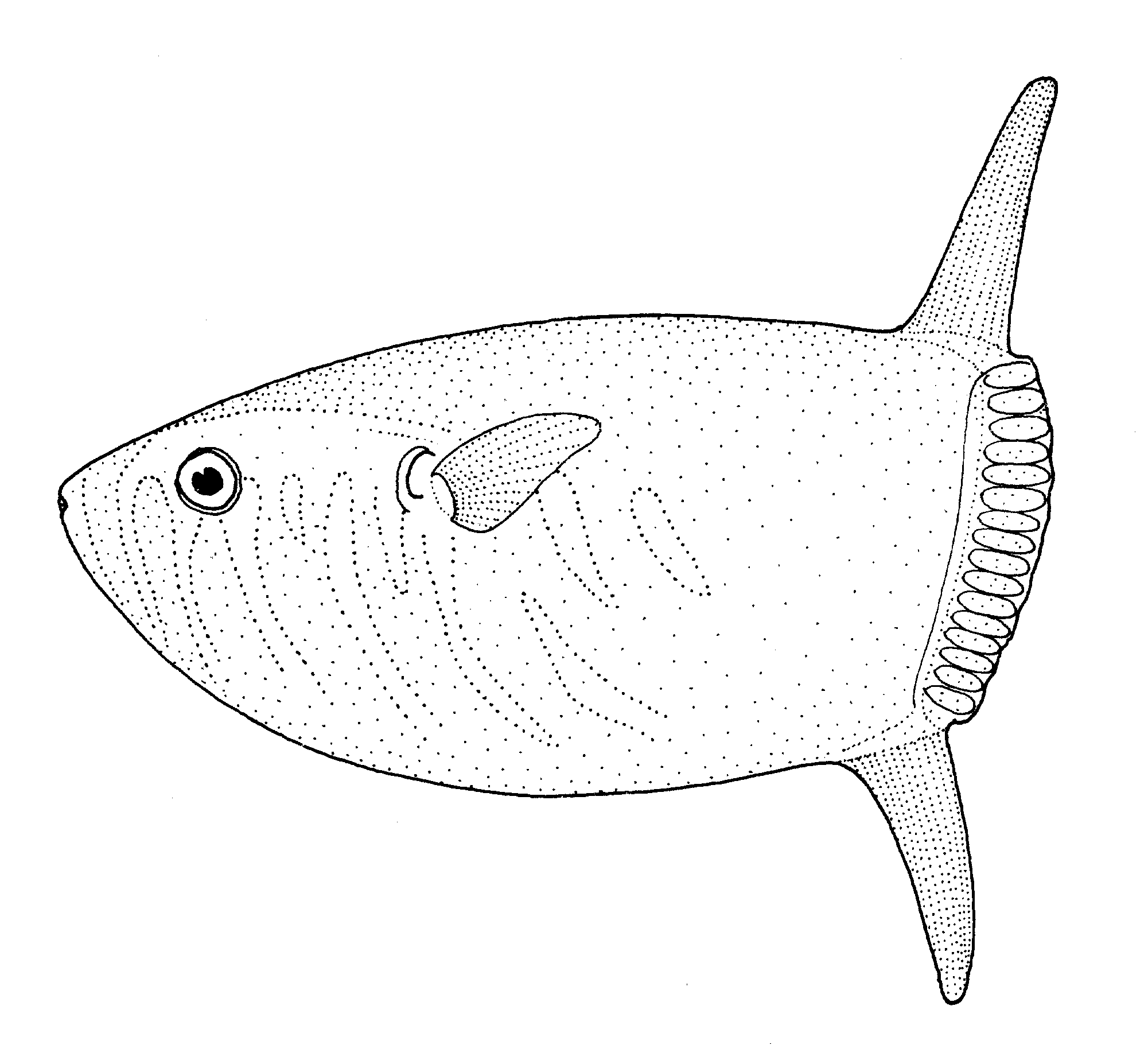
Slender sunfish Ranzania laevis

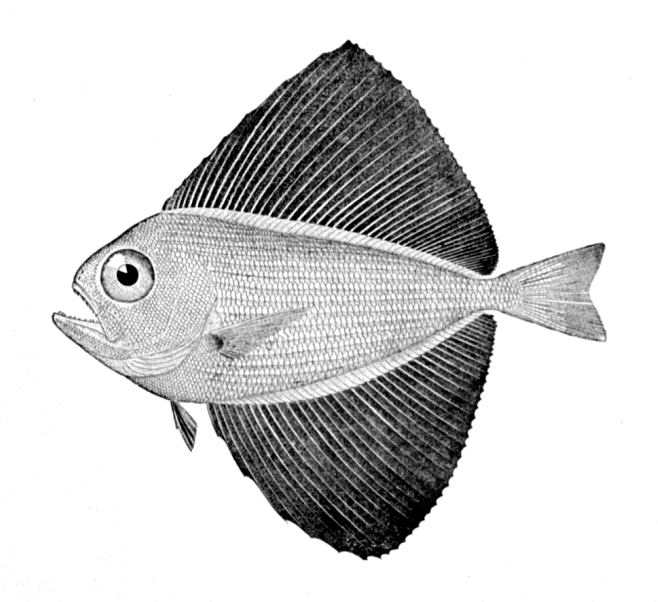
Fanfish Pteraclis carolinus

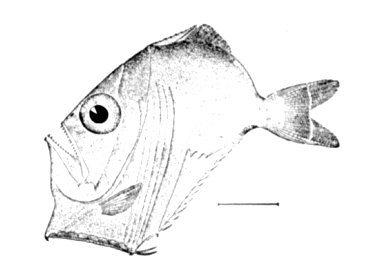
Diaphanous hatchetfish Sternoptyx diaphana

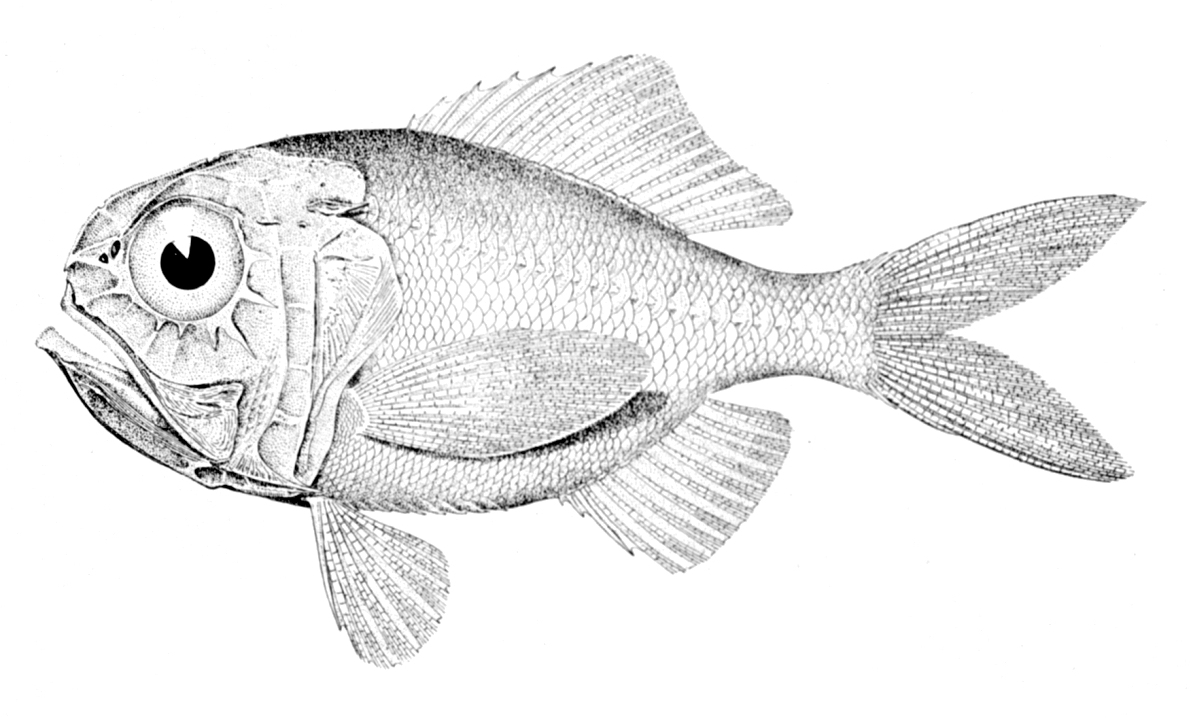
Silver roughy Hoplostethus mediterraneus

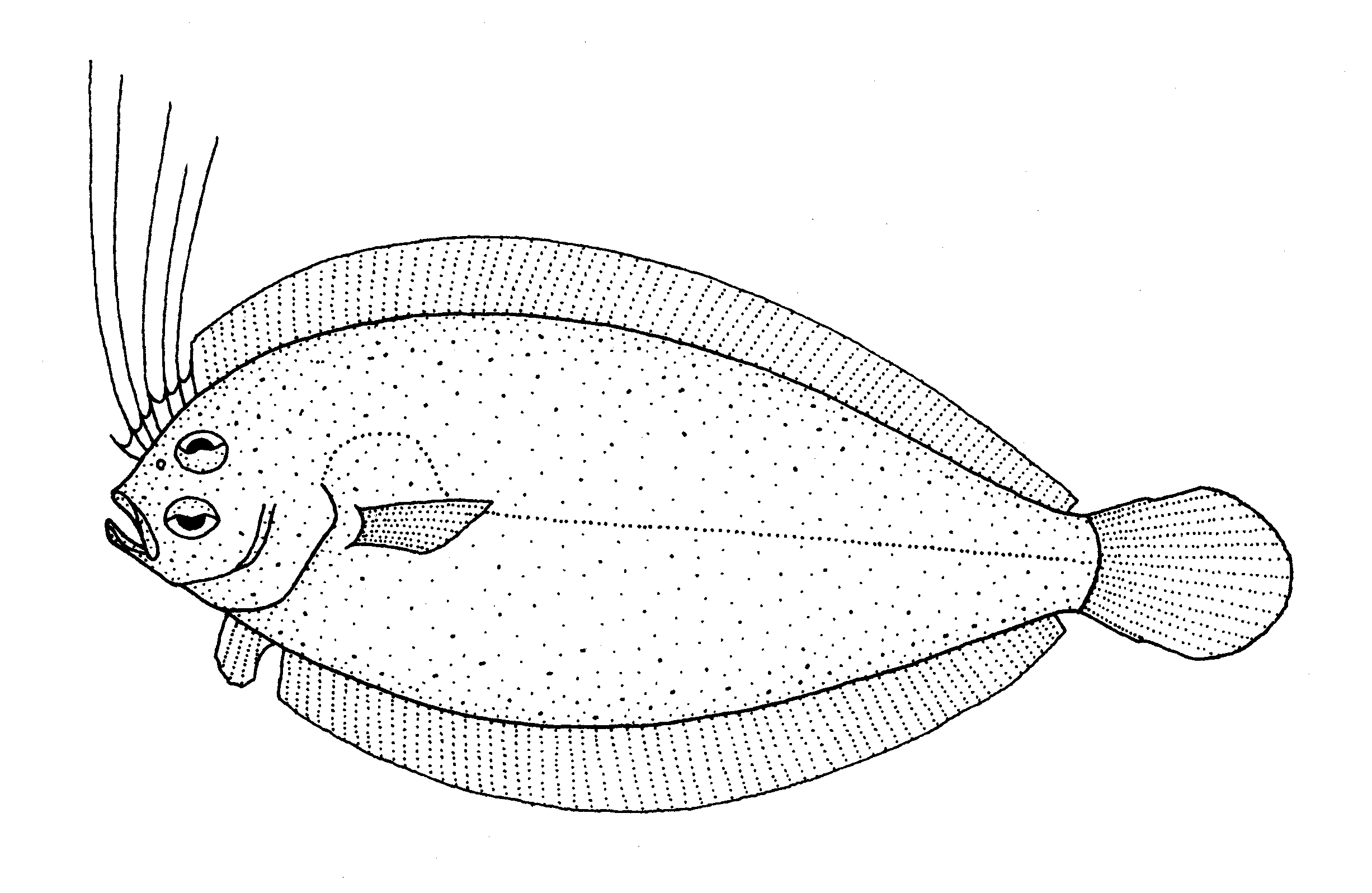
Crested flounder Lophonectes gallus

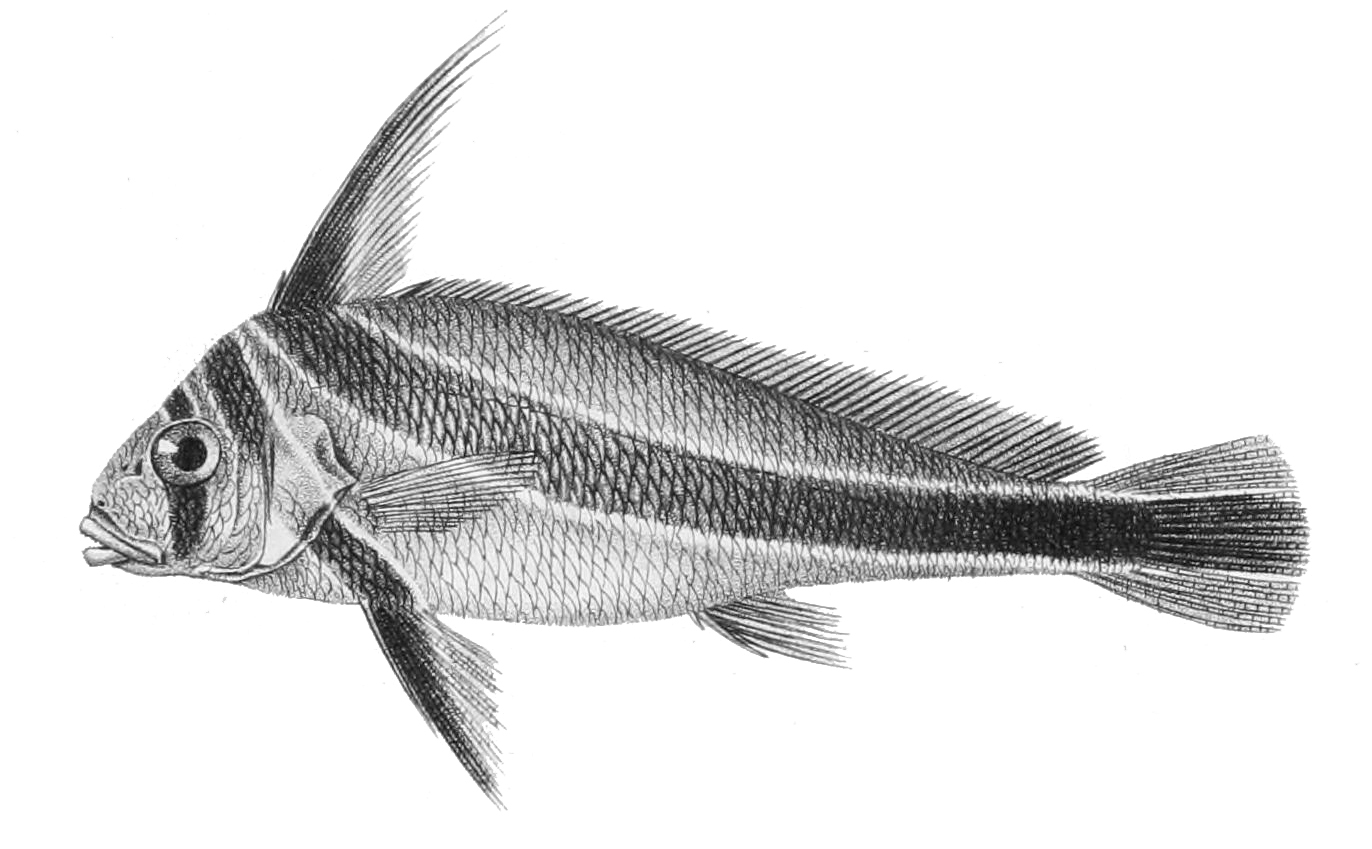
Jack-knifefish Equetus lanceolatus

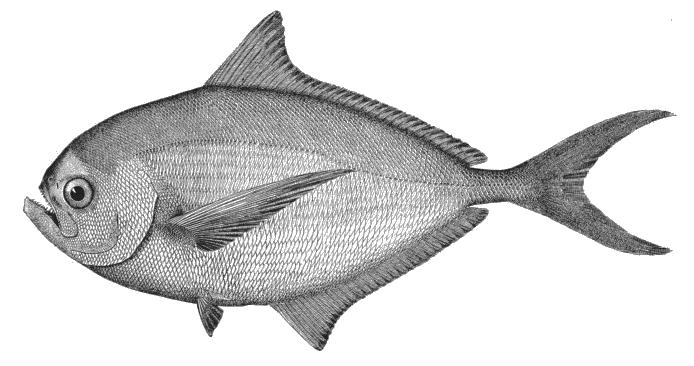
Atlantic pomfret Brama brama

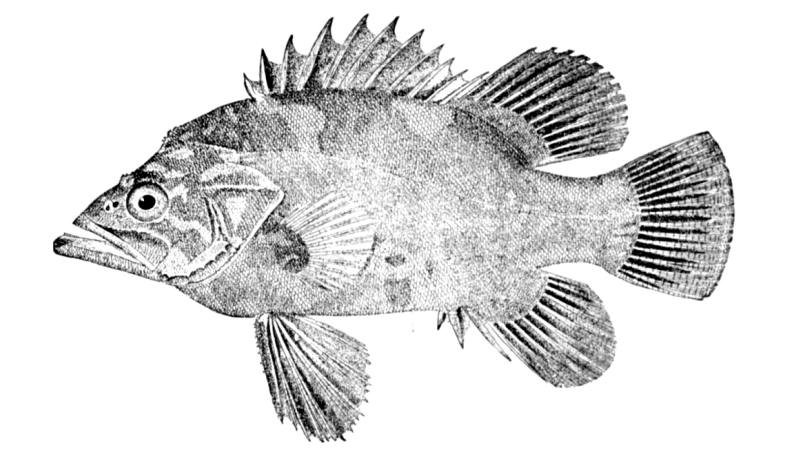
Atlantic wreckfish Polyprion americanus

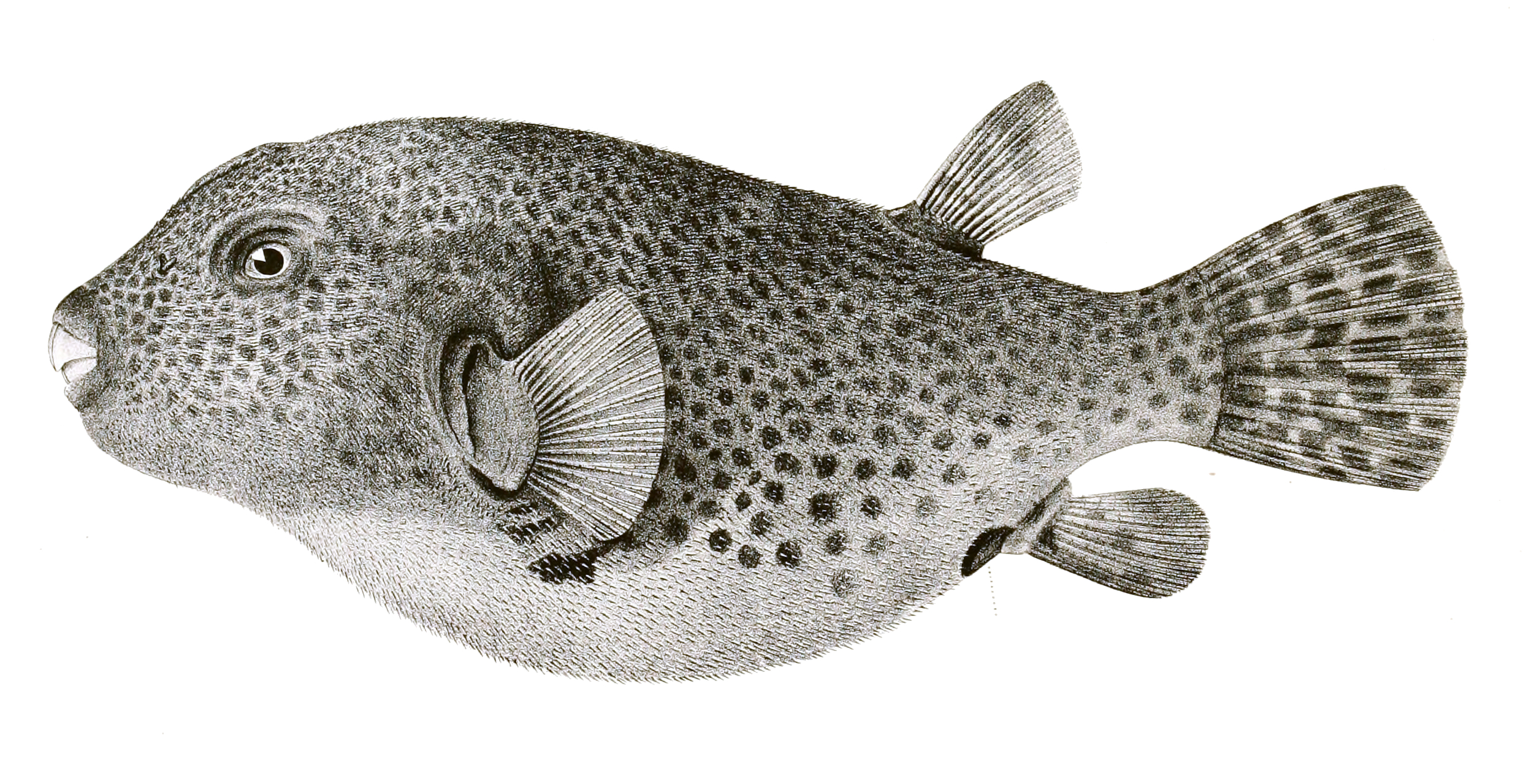
Stellate pufferfish Arothron stellatus

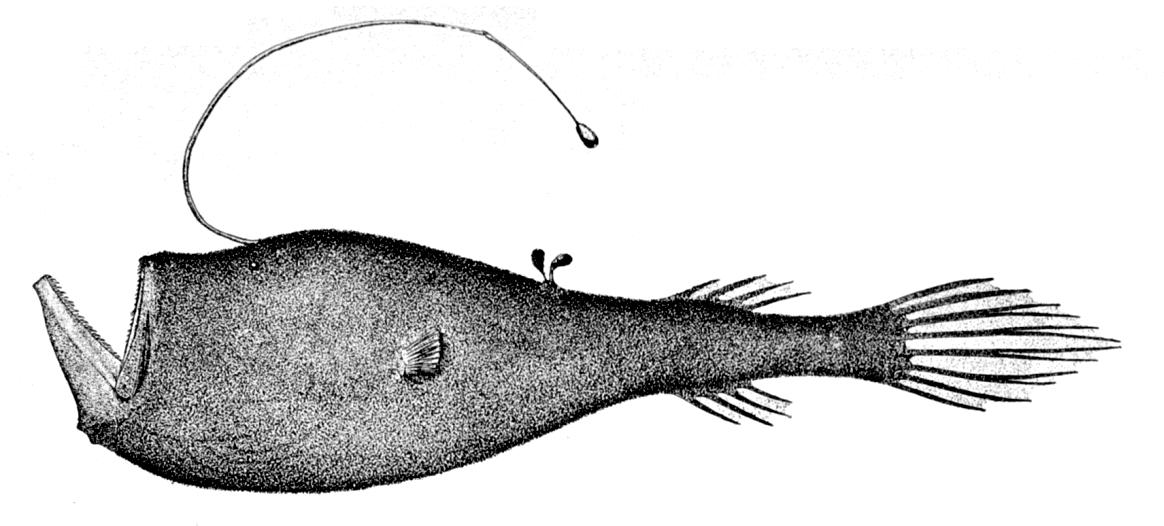
Stargazing seadevil Ceratias uranoscopus

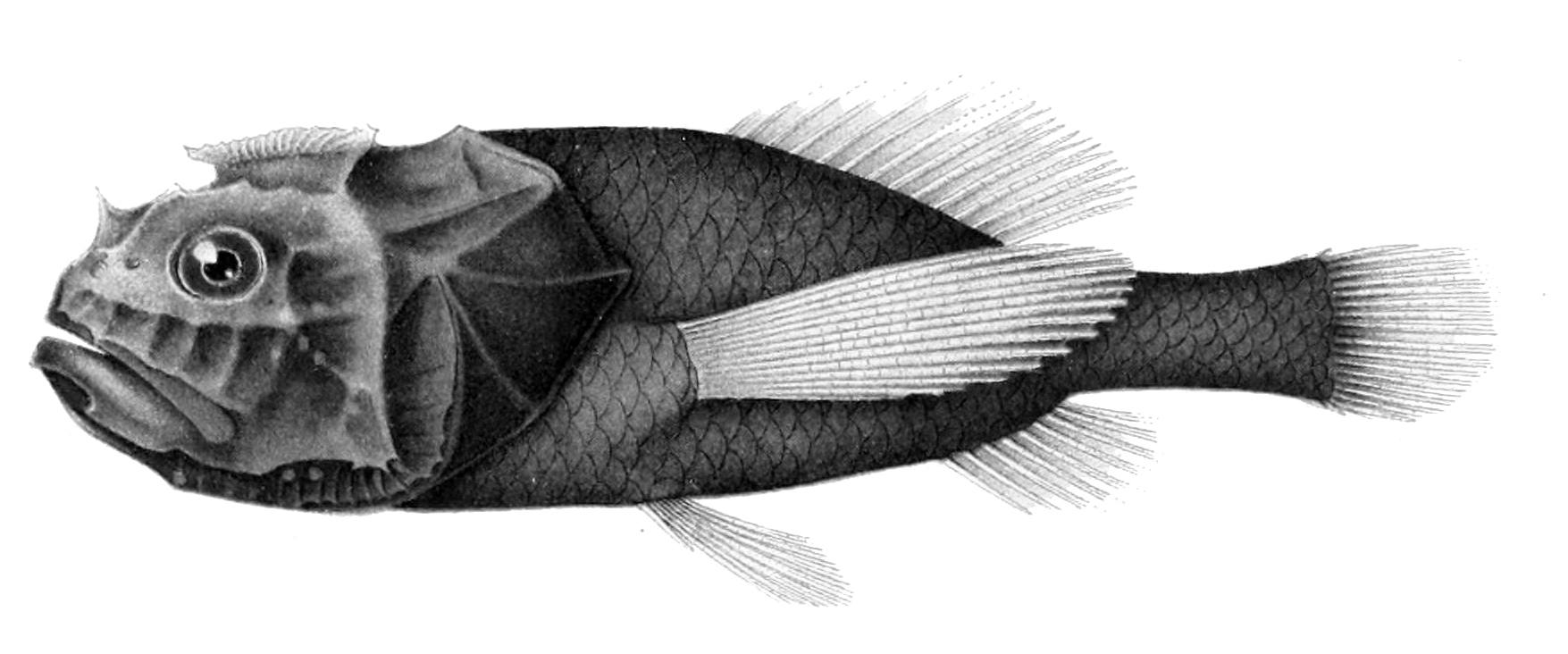
Ridgehead Poromitra unicornis

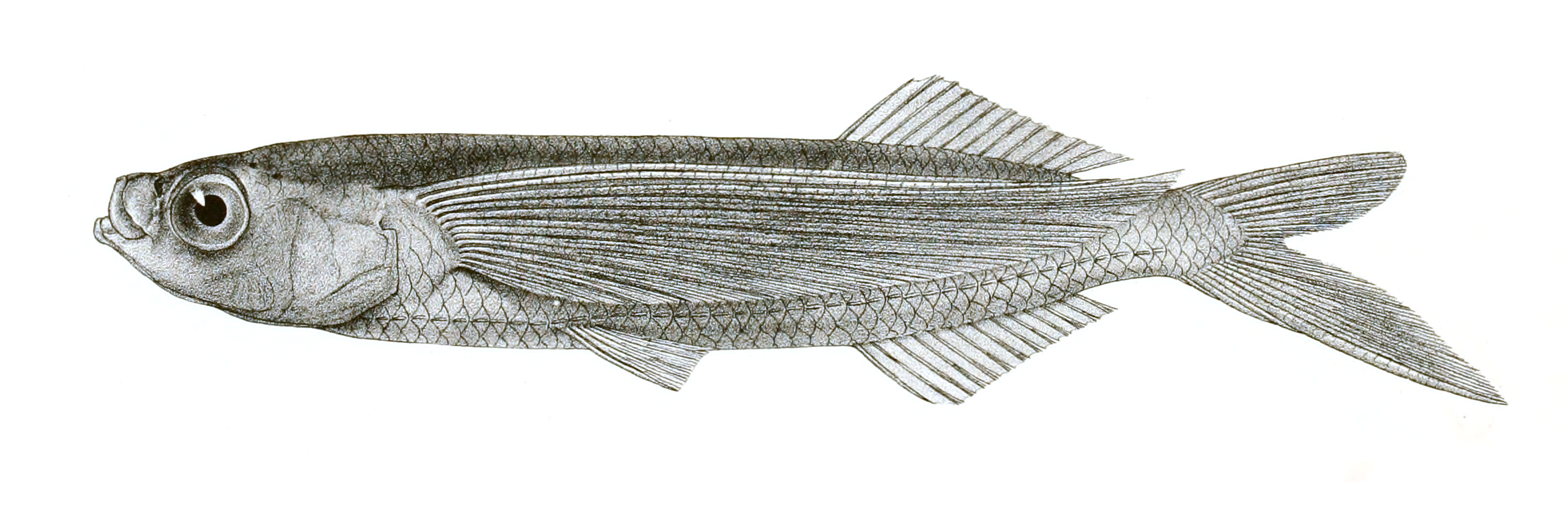
Tropical two-wing flyingfish Exocoetus evolans

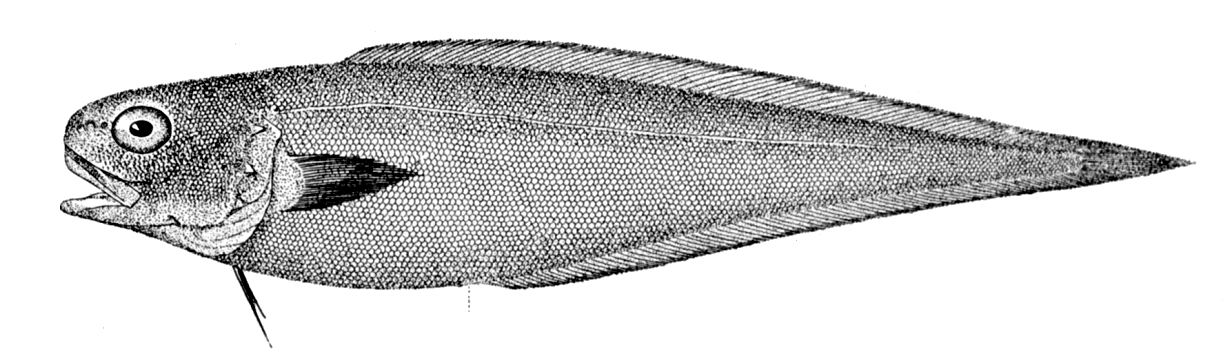
Cusk-eel Benthocometes robustus

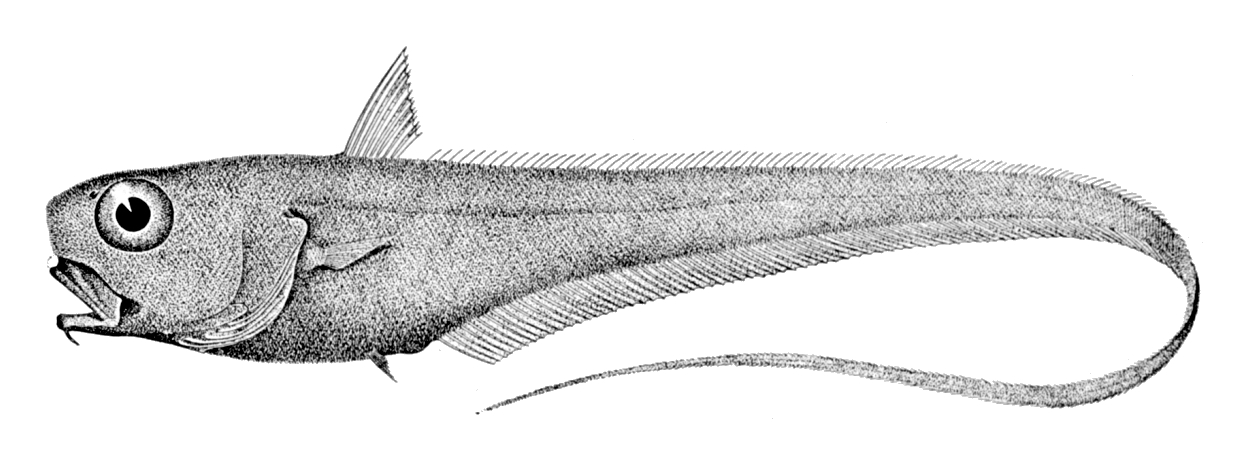
Rattail Trachonurus sulcatus

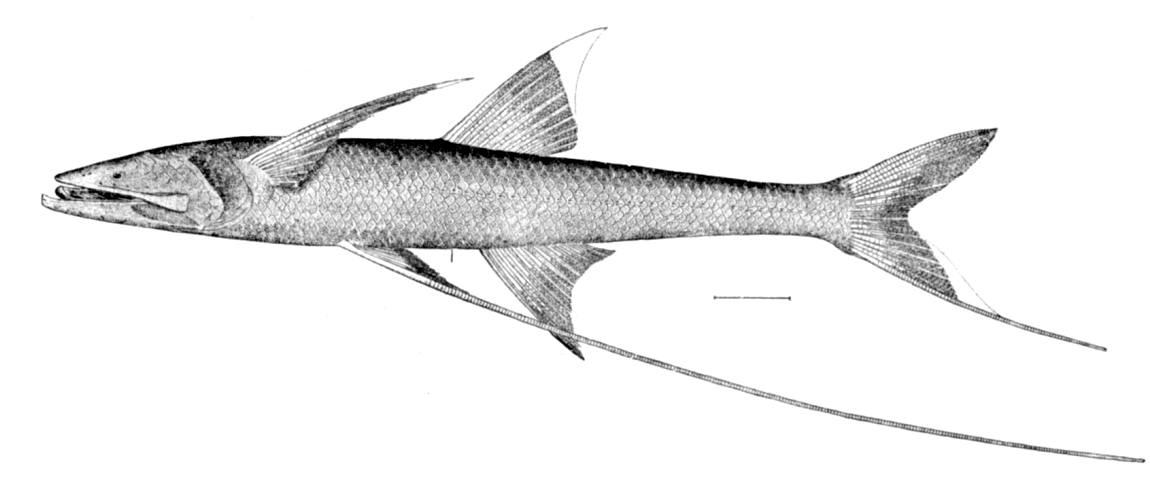
Tripod fish Bathypterois grallator

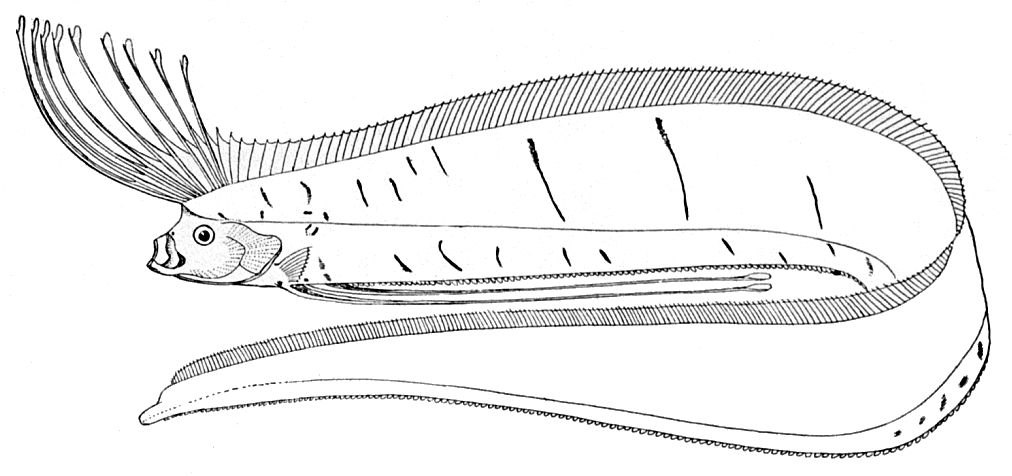
Giant oarfish Regalecus glesne

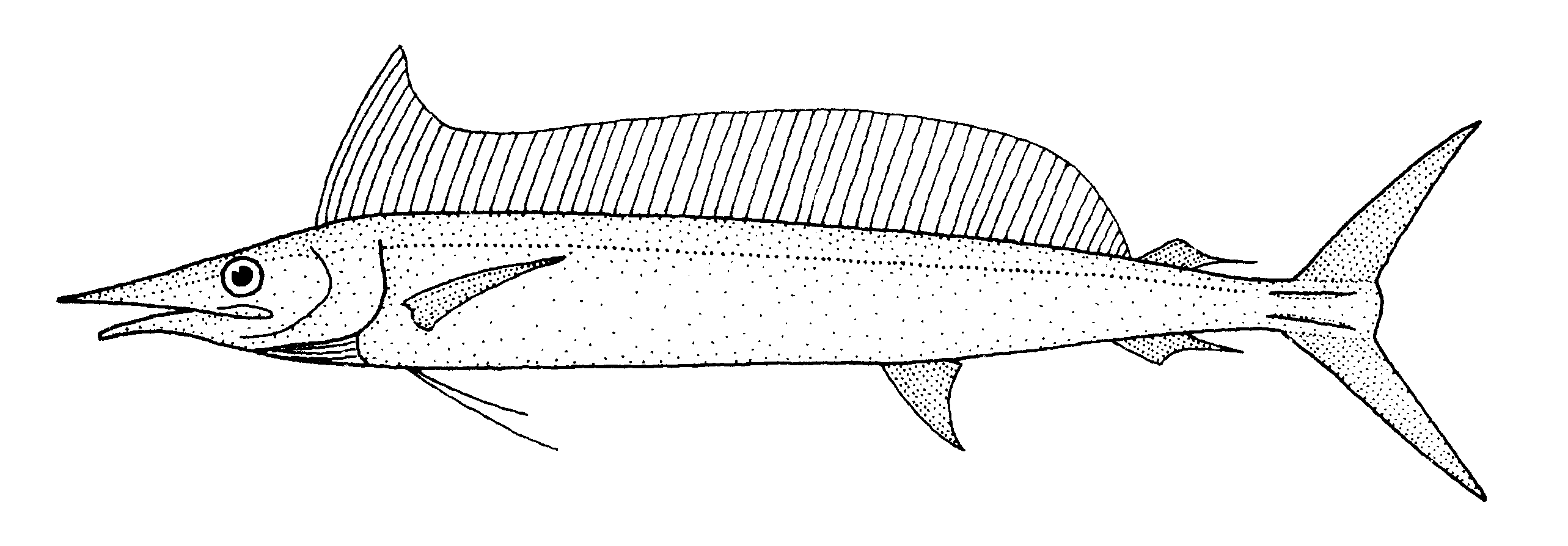
Shortbill spearfish Tetrapturus angustirostris

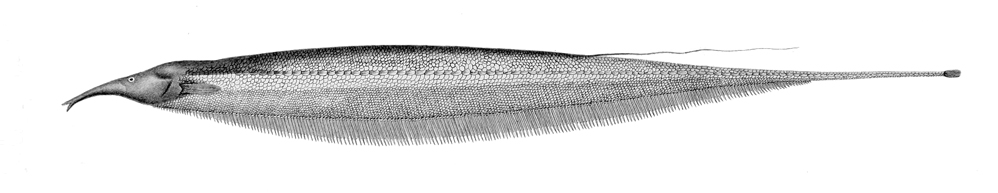
Ghost knifefish Sternarchorhynchus oxyrhynchus

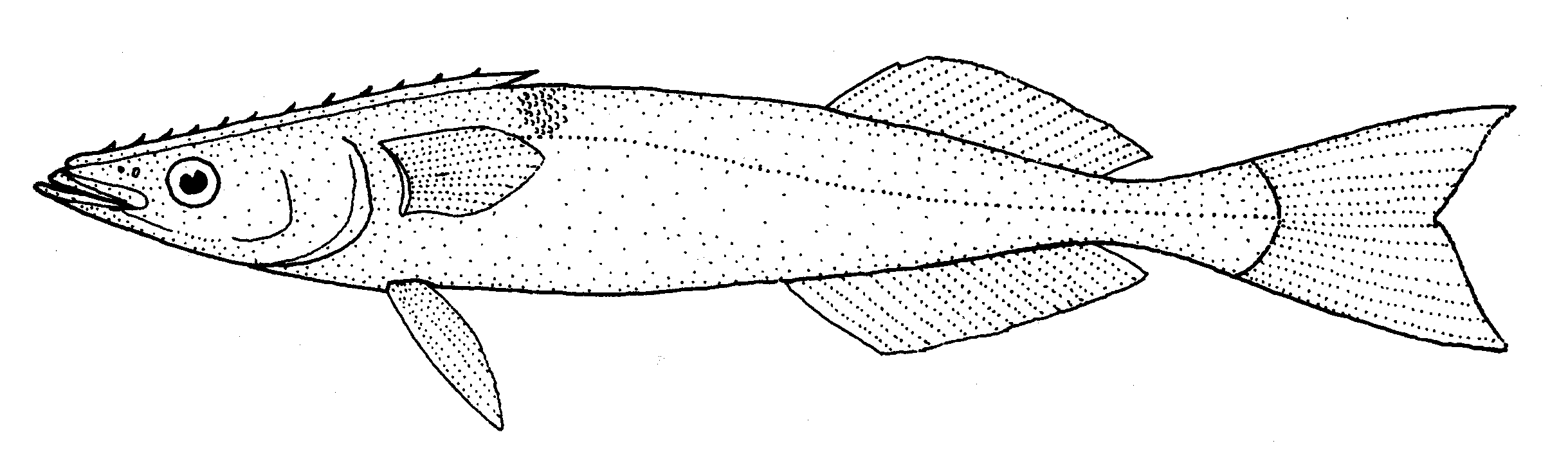
Remora Remora brachyptera

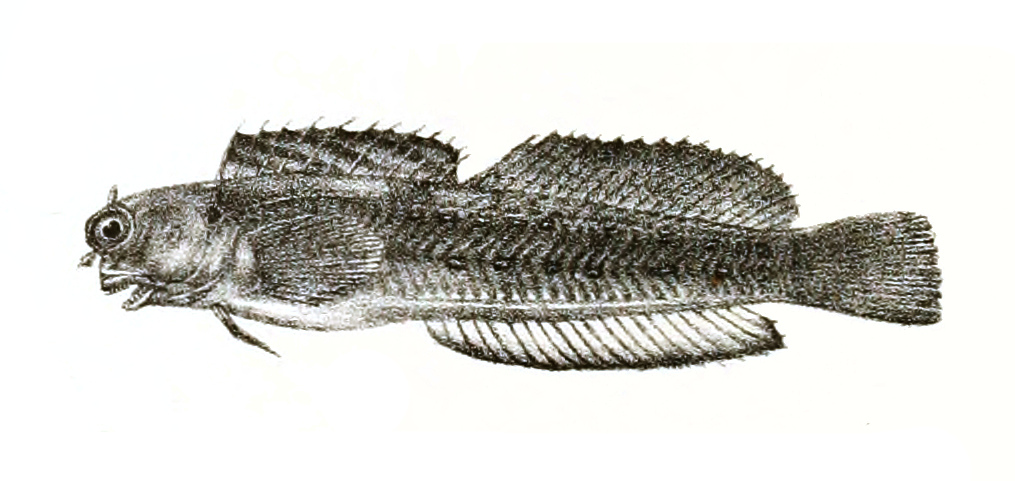
Blue-dashed rockskipper Blenniella periophthalmus

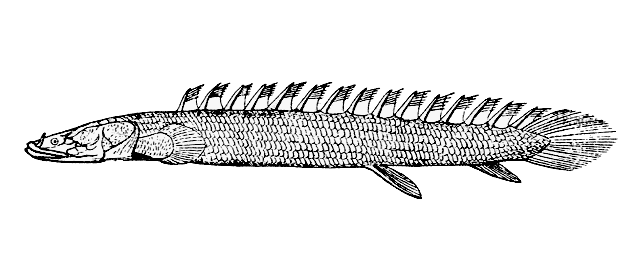
Nile bichir Polypterus bichir

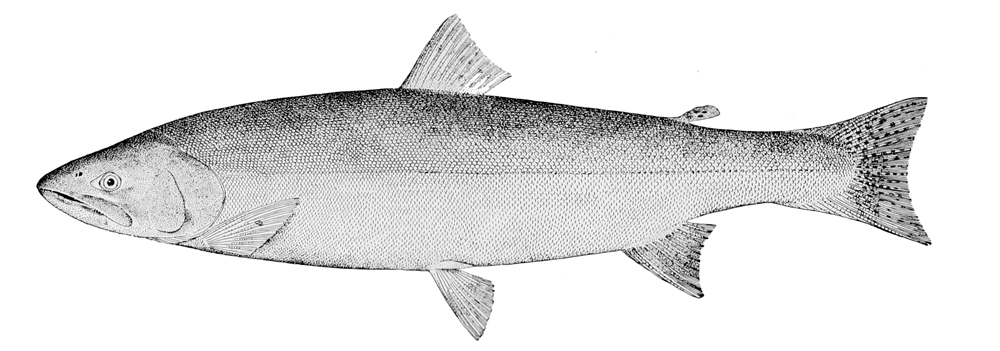
Coastal cutthroat trout Oncorhynchus clarkii

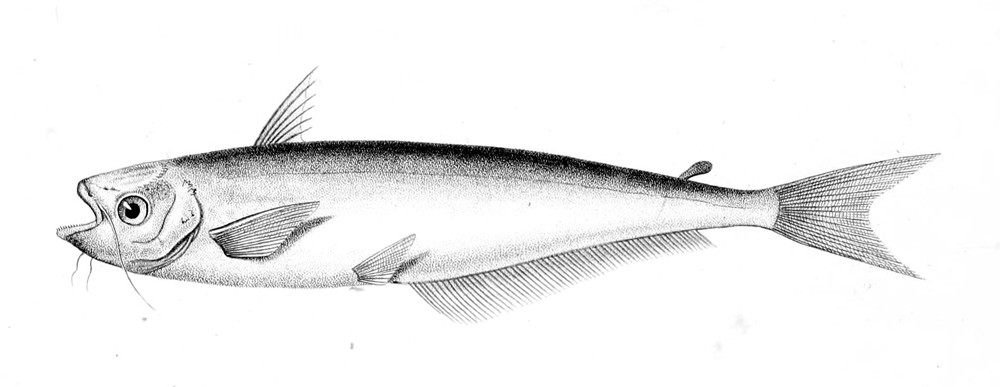
African butter catfish Schilbe mystus

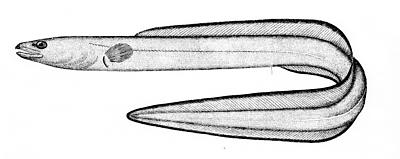
Conger eel Leptocephalus conger

== Cartilaginous fishes ==
Cartilaginous fishes, like this shark, have fins that are elongated and supported with soft and unsegmented rays named ceratotrichia, filaments of elastic protein resembling the horny keratin in hair and feathers.

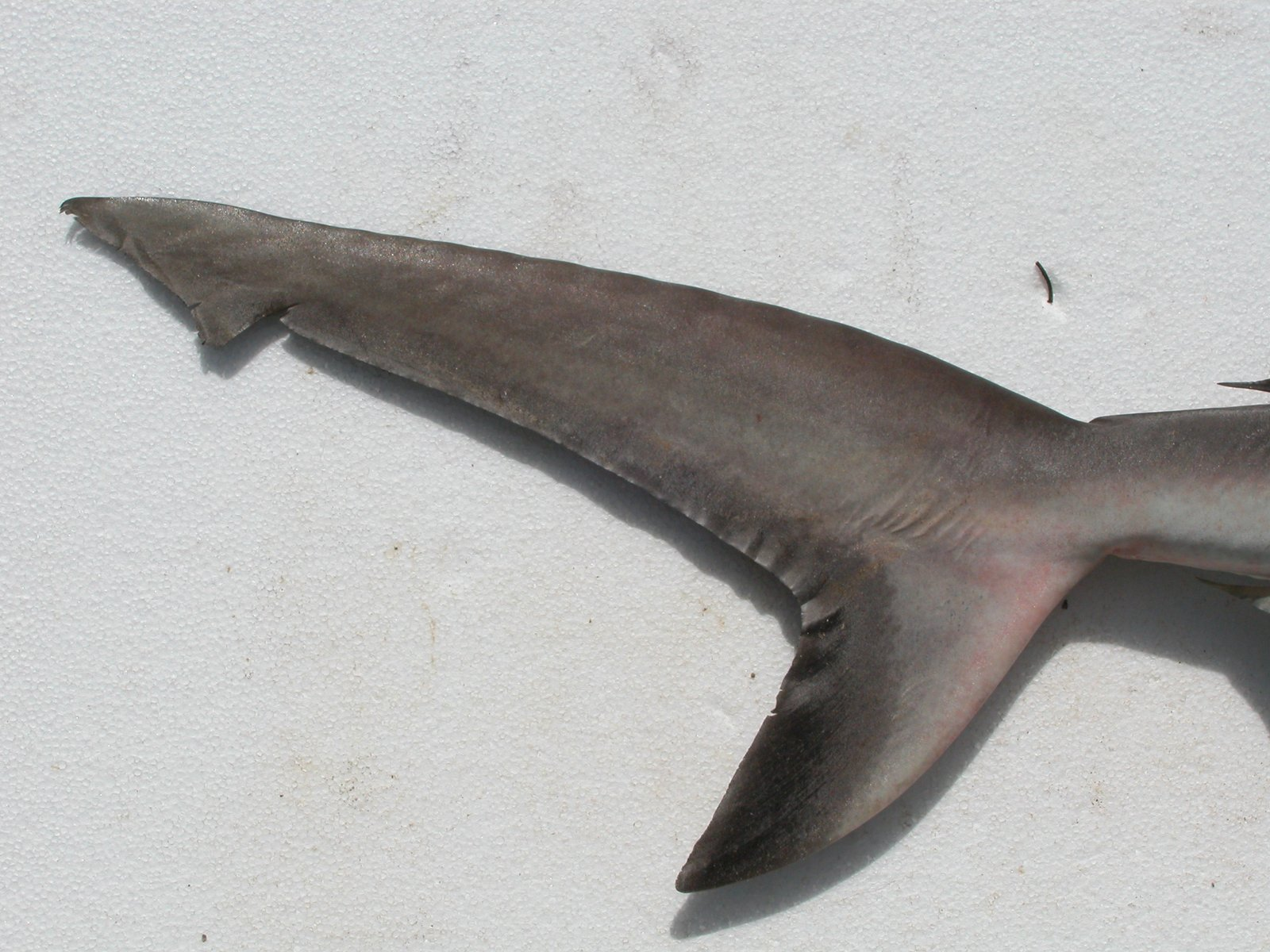
Caudal fin of a grey reef shark

Cartilaginous fishes form a class of fishes called Chondrichthyes. They have skeletons made of cartilage rather than bone. The class includes sharks, rays and chimaeras.

Shark fin skeletons are elongated and supported with soft and unsegmented rays named ceratotrichia, filaments of elastic protein resembling the horny keratin in hair and feathers. Originally the pectoral and pelvic girdles, which do not contain any dermal elements, did not connect. In later forms, each pair of fins became ventrally connected in the middle when scapulocoracoid and puboischiadic bars evolved. In rays, the pectoral fins have connected to the head and are very flexible. One of the primary characteristics present in most sharks is the heterocercal tail, which aids in locomotion. Most sharks have eight fins. Sharks can only drift away from objects directly in front of them because their fins do not allow them to move in the tail-first direction.

Unlike modern cartilaginous fish, members of stem chondrichthyan lineages (e.g. the †climatiids and the †diplacanthids) possessed pectoral dermal plates as well as dermal spines associated with the paired fins. The oldest species demonstrating these features is the †acanthodian †Fanjingshania renovata from the lower Silurian (Aeronian) of China. Fanjingshania possess compound pectoral plates composed of dermal scales fused to a bony plate and fin spines formed entirely of bone. Fin spines associated with the dorsal fins are rare among extant cartilaginous fishes, but are present, for instance, in Heterodontus or Squalus. Dorsal fin spines are typically developed in many fossil groups, such as in †Hybodontiformes, †Ctenacanthiformes or †Xenacanthida. In †Stethacanthus, the first dorsal fin spine was modified, forming a spine-brush complex.

As with most fish, the tails of sharks provide thrust, making speed and acceleration dependent on tail shape. Caudal fin shapes vary considerably between shark species, due to their evolution in separate environments. Sharks possess a heterocercal caudal fin in which the dorsal portion is usually noticeably larger than the ventral portion. This is because the shark's vertebral column extends into that dorsal portion, providing a greater surface area for muscle attachment. This allows more efficient locomotion among these negatively buoyant cartilaginous fish. By contrast, most bony fish possess a homocercal caudal fin.

Tiger sharks have a large upper lobe, which allows for slow cruising and sudden bursts of speed. The tiger shark must be able to twist and turn in the water easily when hunting to support its varied diet, whereas the porbeagle shark, which hunts schooling fish such as mackerel and herring, has a large lower lobe to help it keep pace with its fast-swimming prey. Other tail adaptations help sharks catch prey more directly, such as the thresher shark's usage of its powerful, elongated upper lobe to stun fish and squid.

On the other hand, rays rely on their enlarged pectoral fins for propulsion. Similarly enlarged pectoral fins can be found in the extinct †Petalodontiformes (e.g. †Belantsea, †Janassa, †Menaspis), which belong to Holocephali (ratfish and their fossil relatives), or in †Aquilolamna (Selachimorpha) and †Squatinactis (Squatinactiformes). Some cartilaginous fishes have an eel-like locomotion (e.g. Chlamydoselachus, †Thrinacoselache, †Phoebodus)

=== Diversity of fins in cartilaginous fishes ===
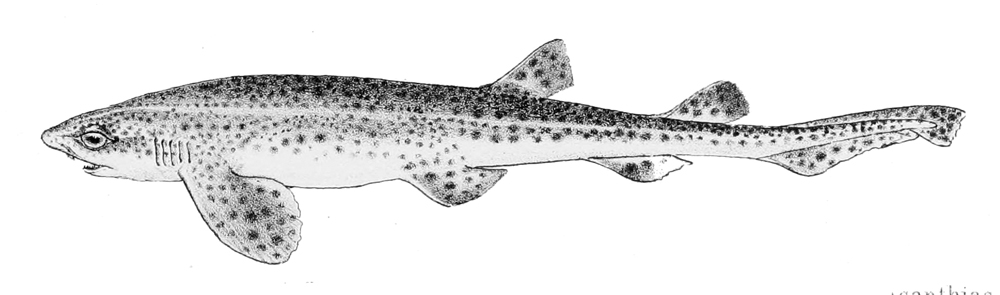
Small-spotted catshark Scyliorhinus canicula

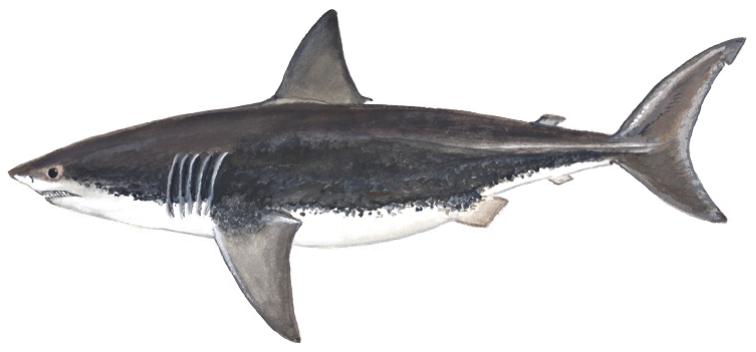
Great white shark Carcharodon carcharias

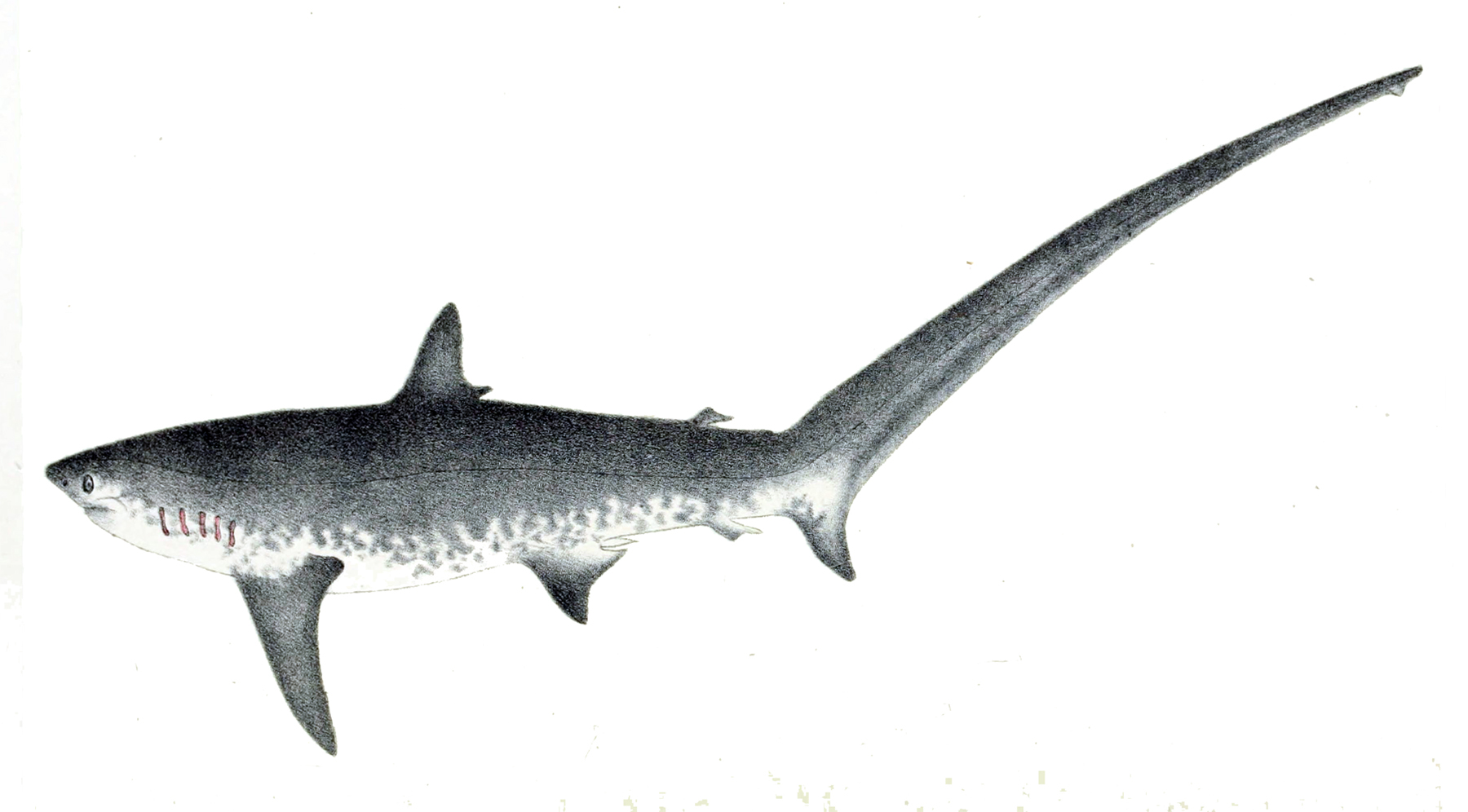
Common thresher Alopias vulpinus

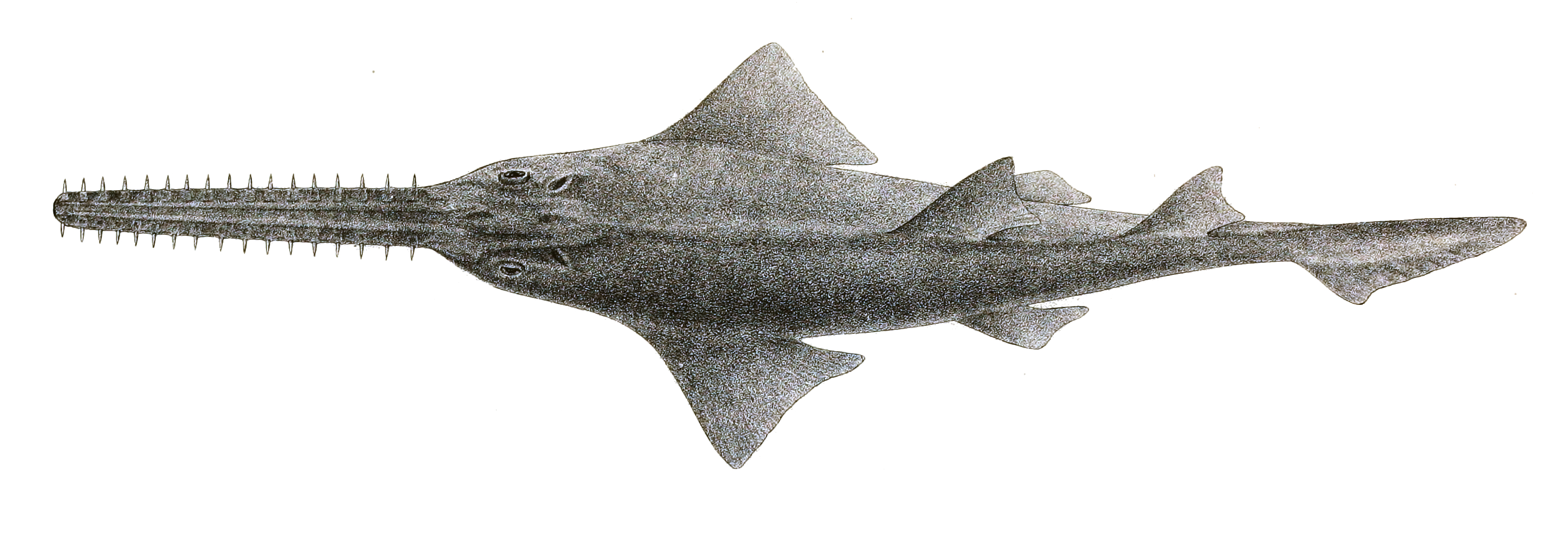
Largetooth sawfish Pristis perotteti

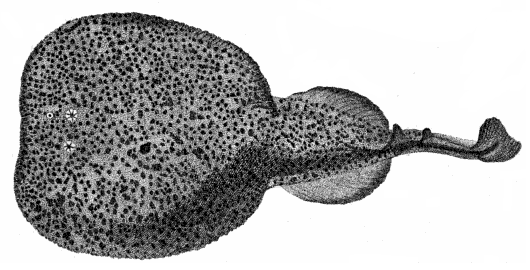
Marbled electric ray Torpedo marmorata

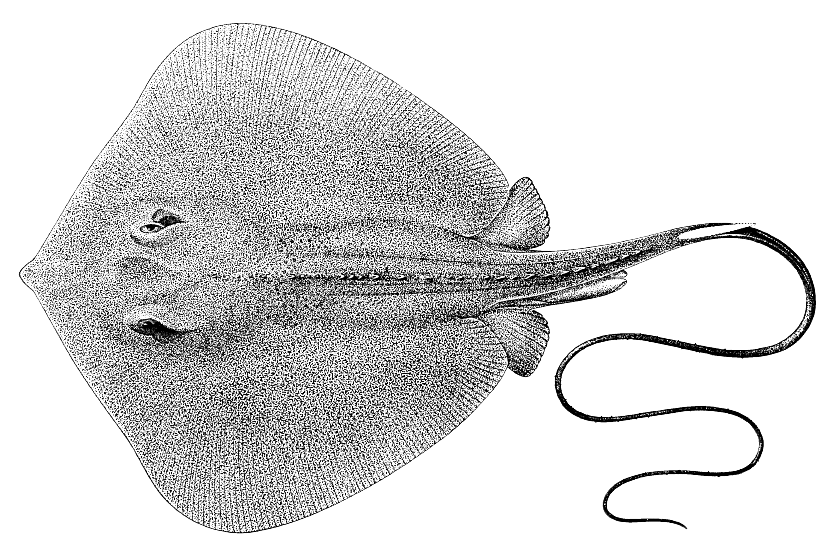
Bennett's stingray Hemitrygon bennettii

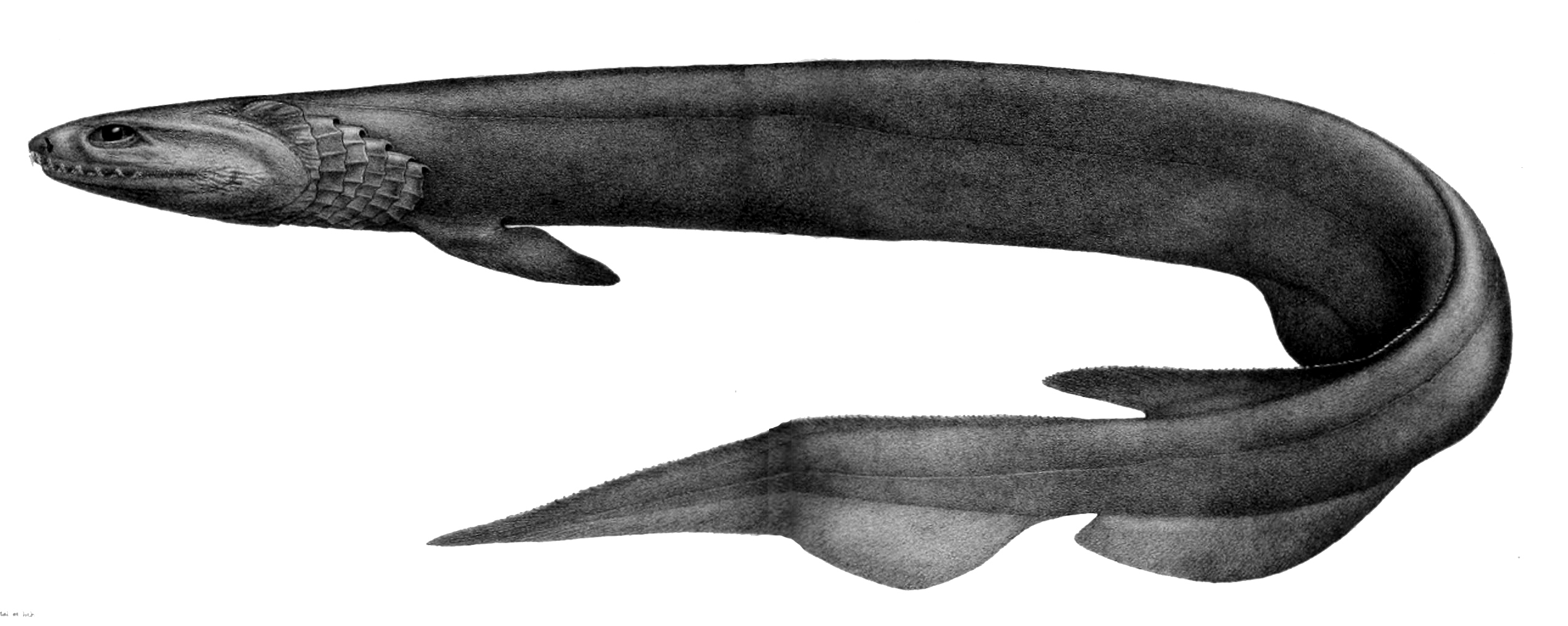
Frilled shark Chlamydoselachus anguineus

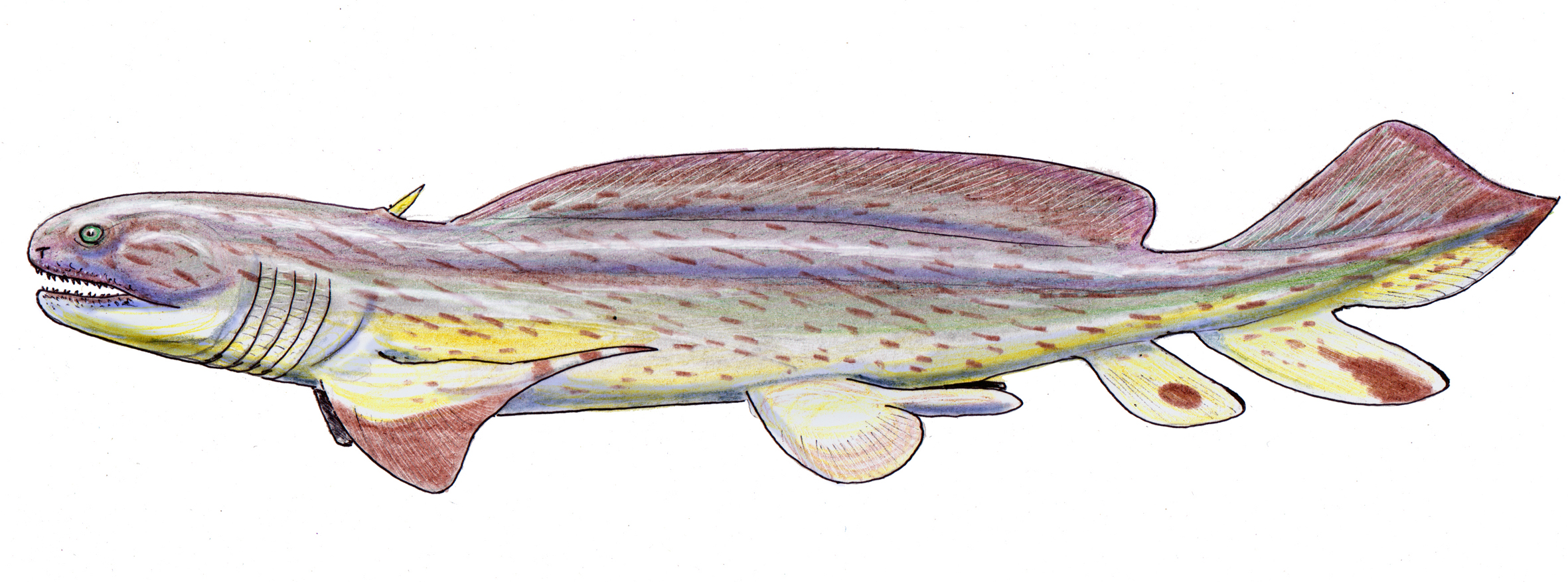
The †xenacanth †Lebachacanthus senckenbergianus

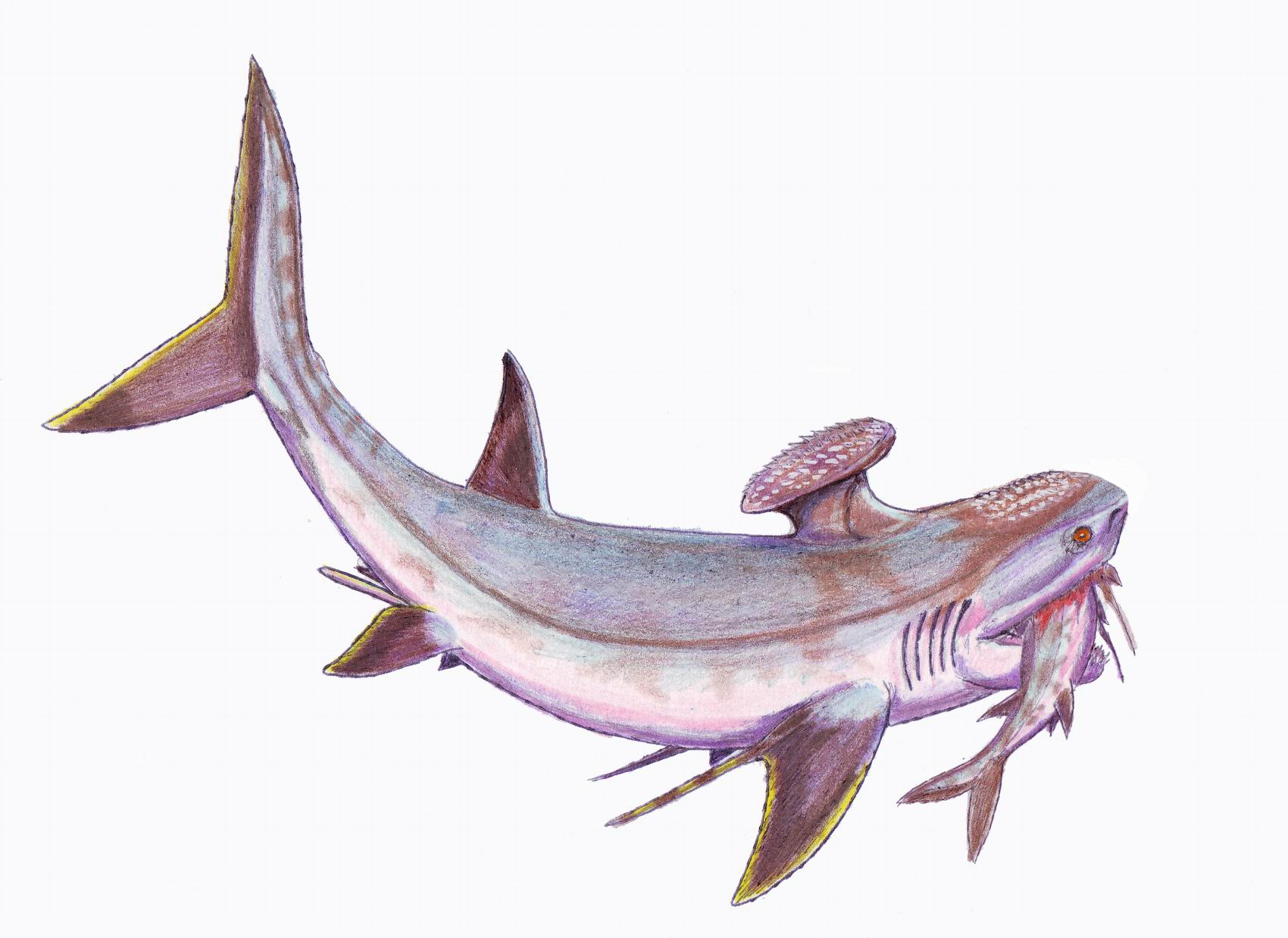
The †symmoriiform †Stethacanthus productus

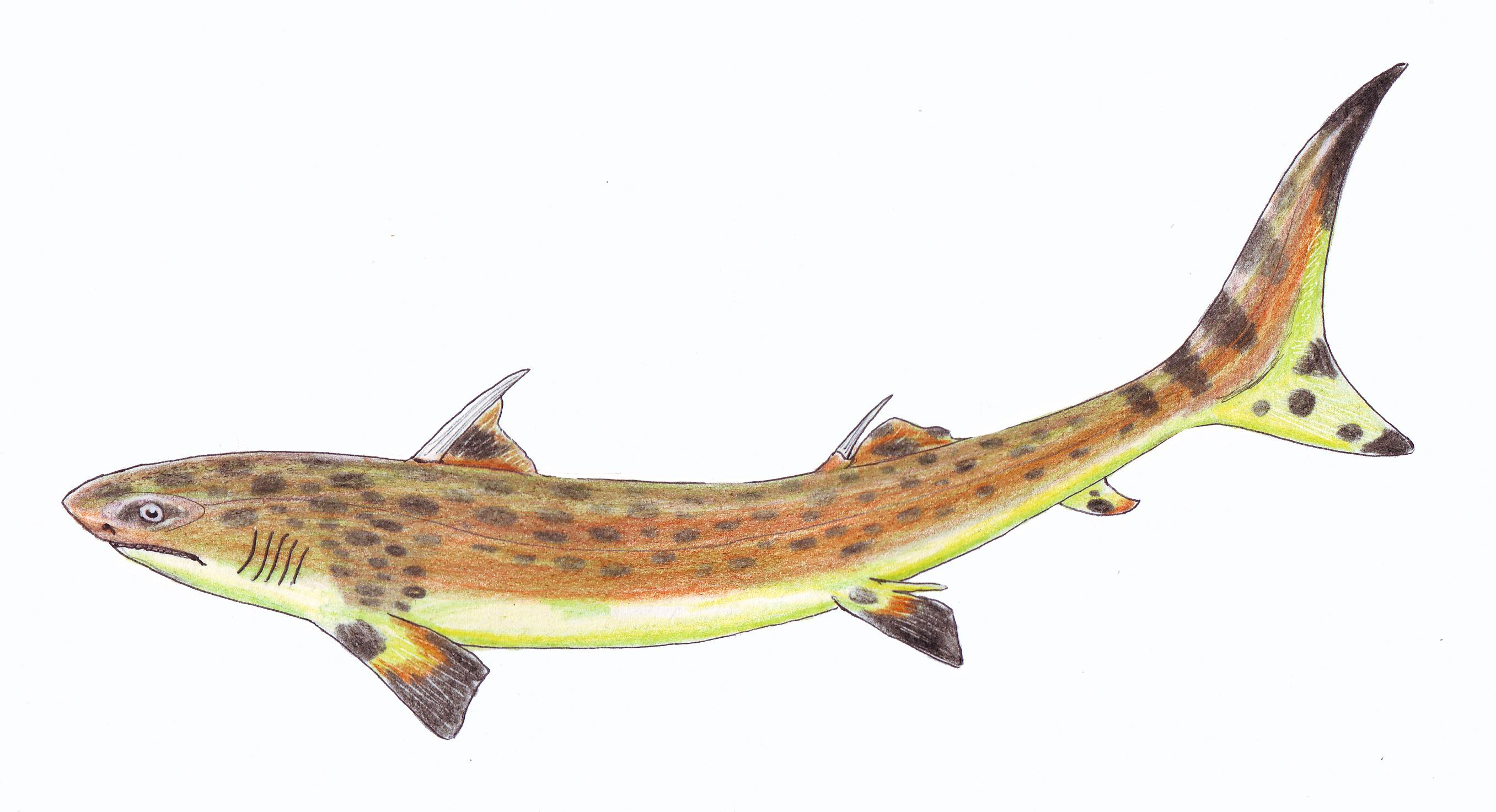
The †ctenacanthid †Wodnika striatula

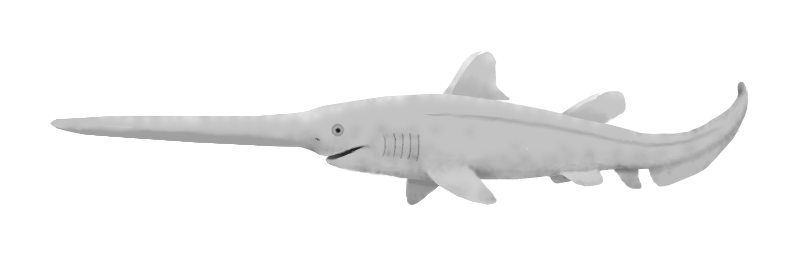
The elasmobranch †Bandringa rayi

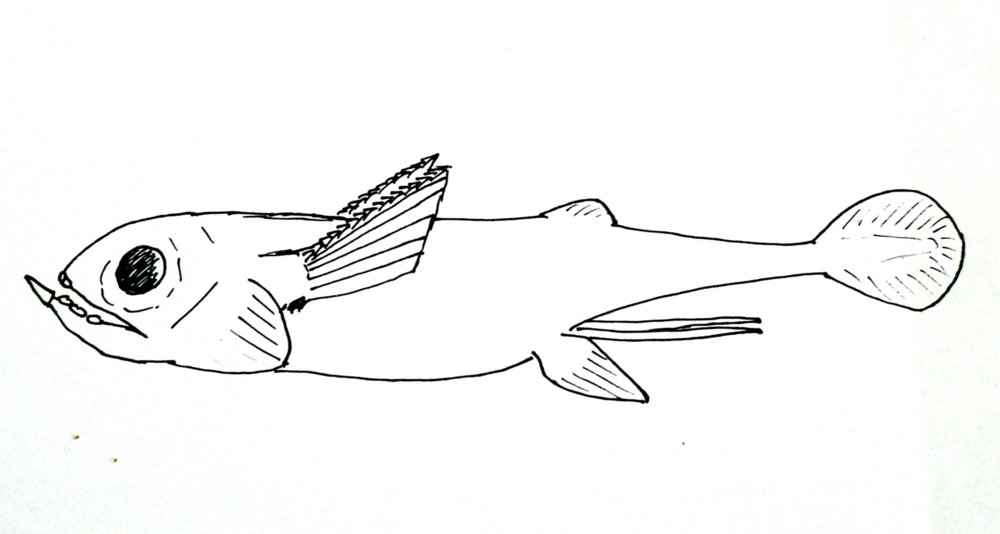
The †Iniopterygiformes †Sibyrhynchus denisoni

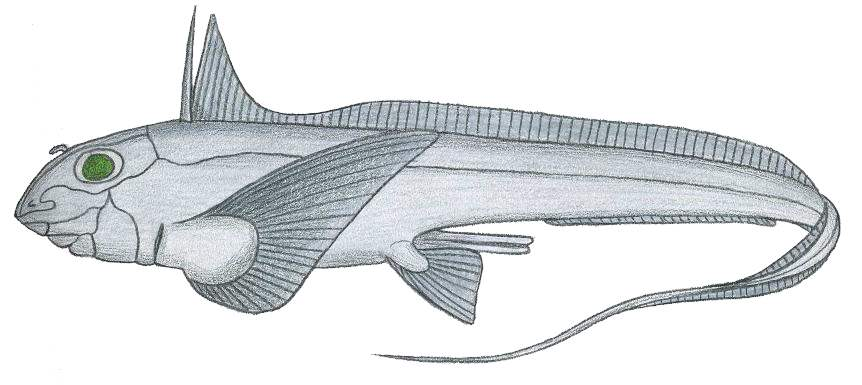
Cuban chimaera Chimaera cubana

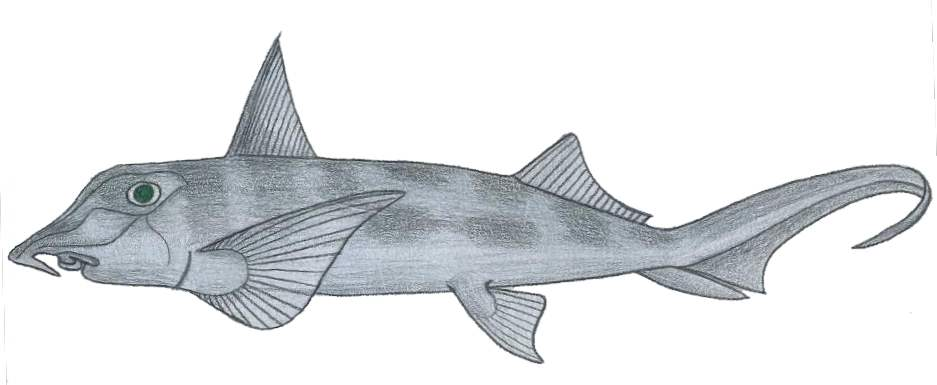
American elephantfish Callorhinchus callorhynchus

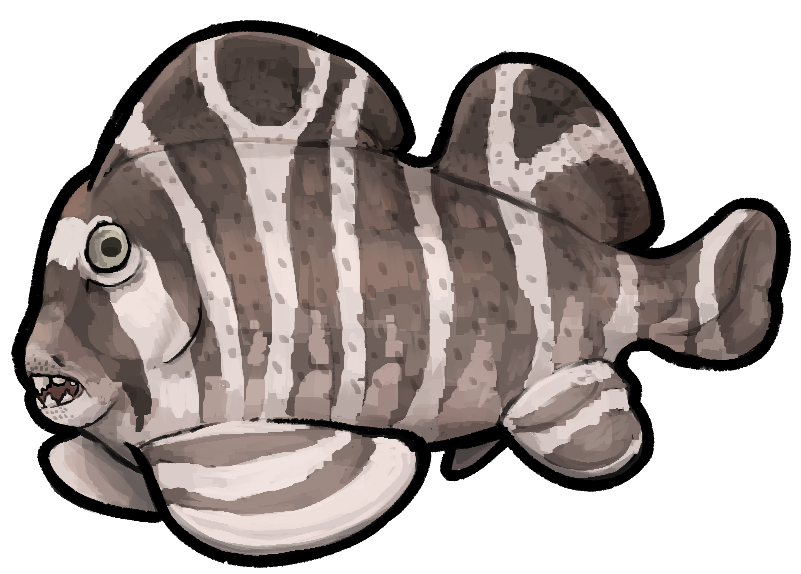
The †petalodontiform †Belantsea montana

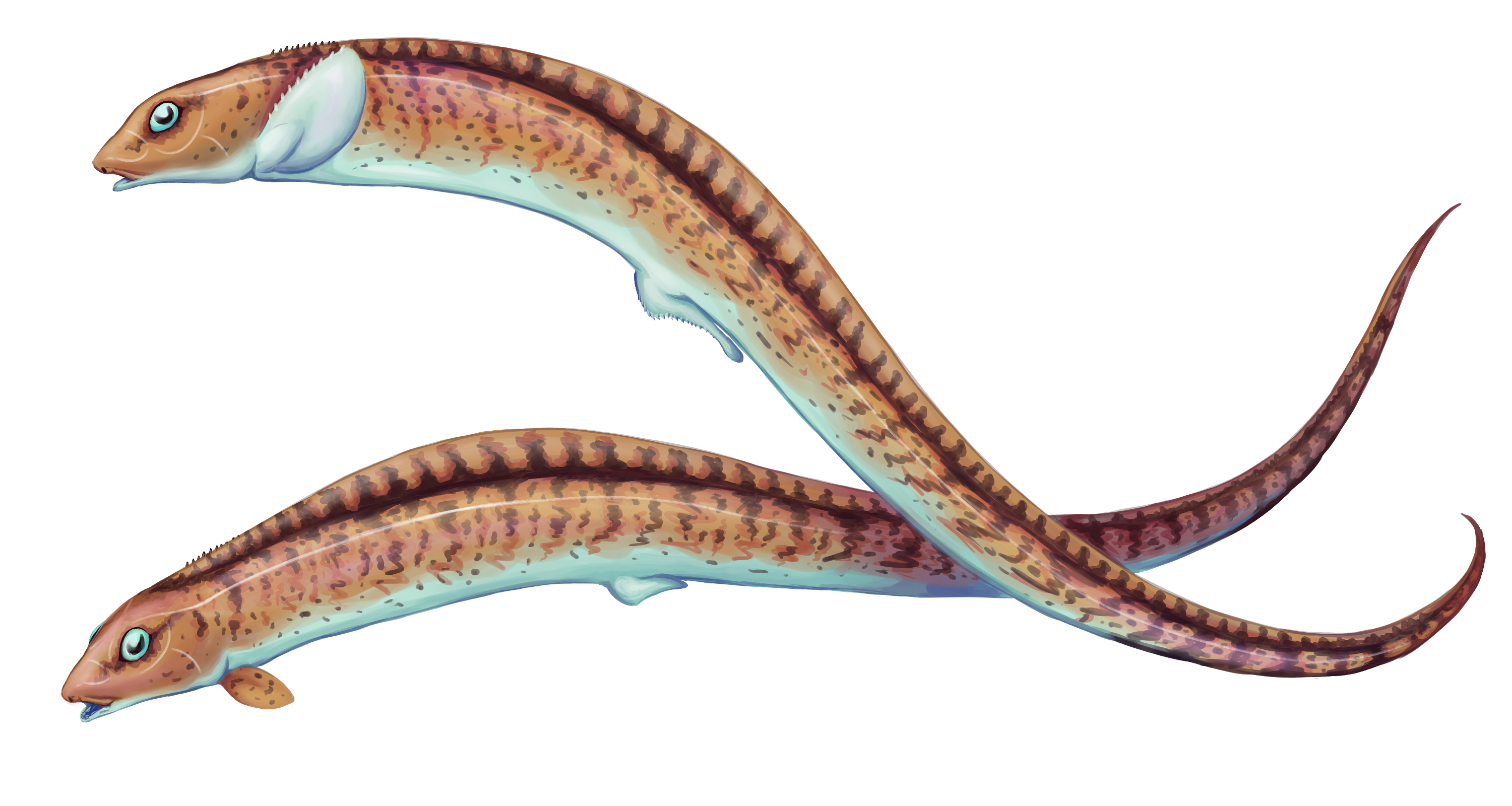
The †chondrenchelyiform †Chondrenchelys problematica

=== Shark finning ===
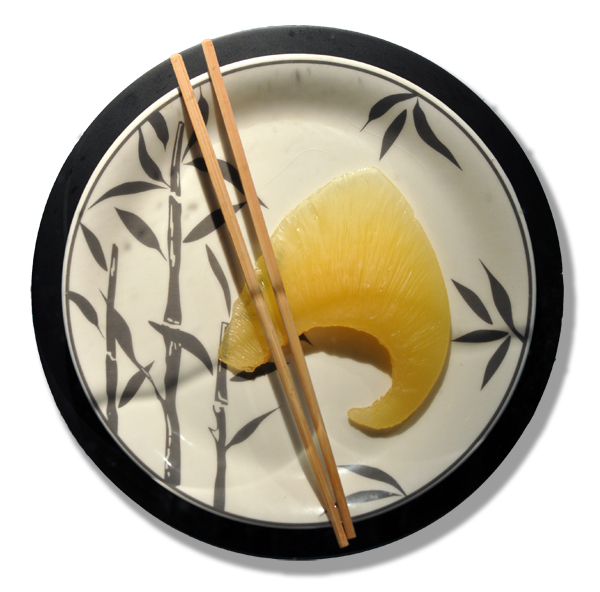
Shark fin

According to the Humane Society International, approximately 100 million sharks are killed each year for their fins, in an act known as shark finning. After the fins are cut off, the mutilated sharks are thrown back in the water and left to die.

In some countries of Asia, shark fins are a culinary delicacy, such as shark fin soup. Currently, international concerns over the sustainability and welfare of sharks have impacted consumption and availability of shark fin soup worldwide. Shark finning is prohibited in many countries.

== Fin functions ==
=== Generating thrust ===
Foil shaped fins generate thrust when moved, the lift of the fin sets water or air in motion and pushes the fin in the opposite direction. Aquatic animals get significant thrust by moving fins back and forth in water. Often the tail fin is used, but some aquatic animals generate thrust from pectoral fins.

Moving fins can provide thrust

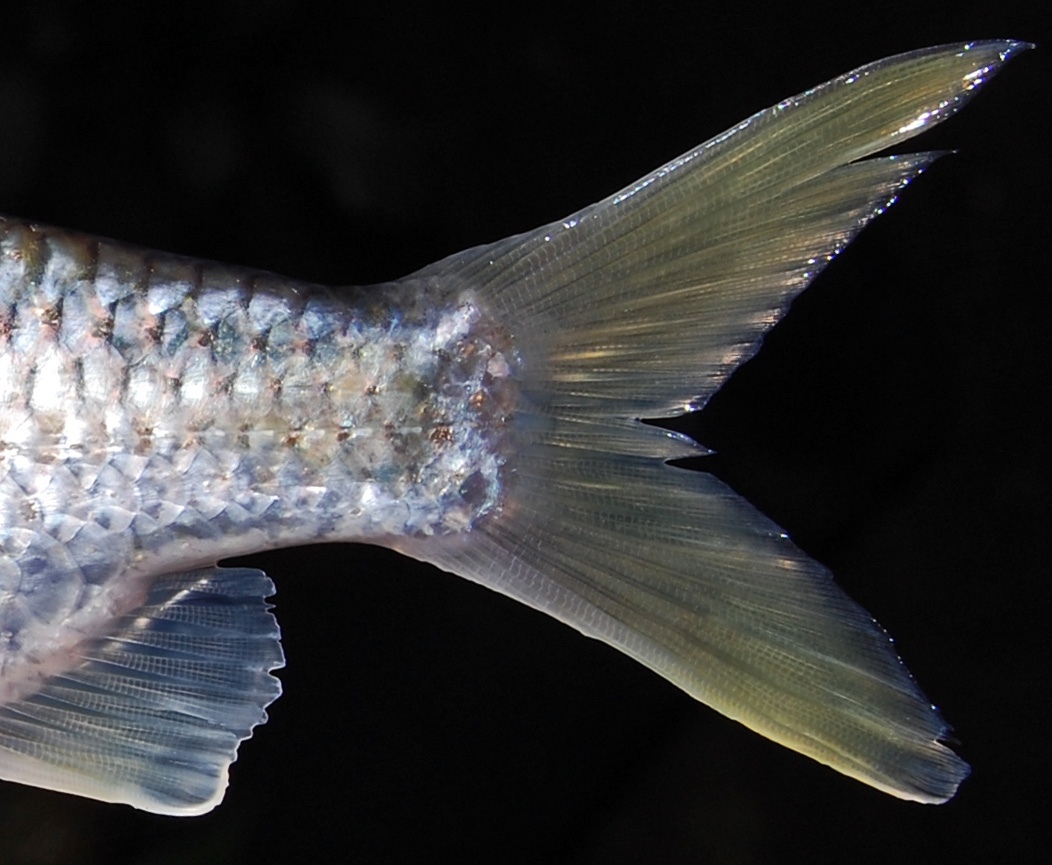
Fish get thrust moving vertical tail fins from side to side.

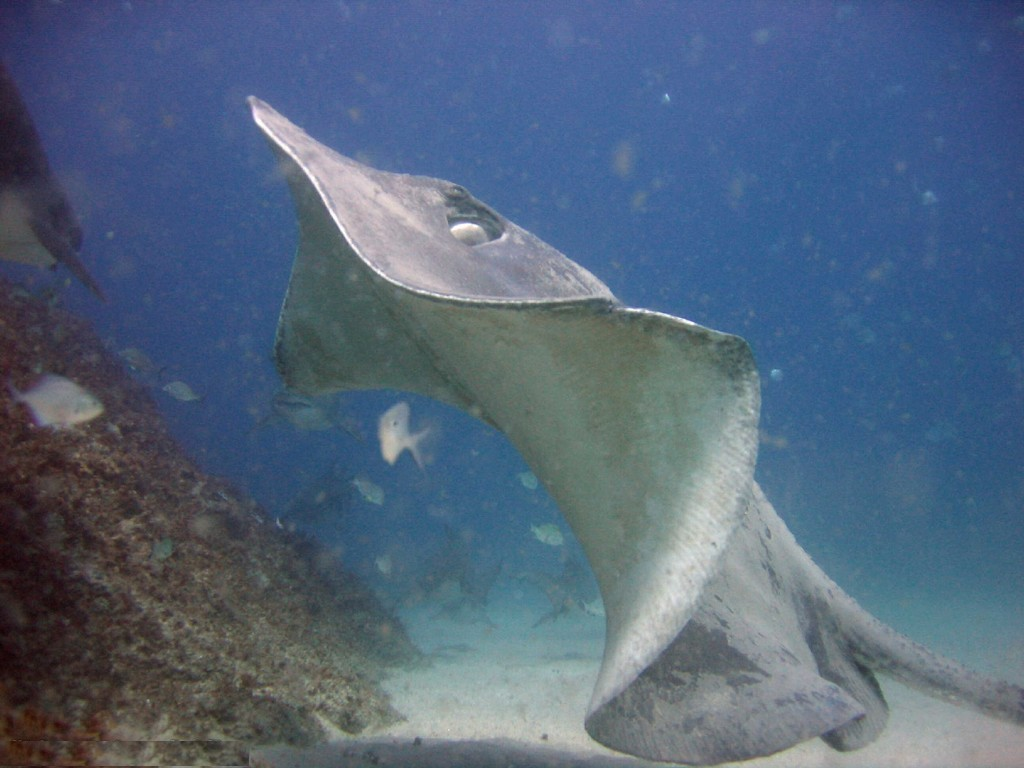
Stingrays get thrust from large pectoral fins.

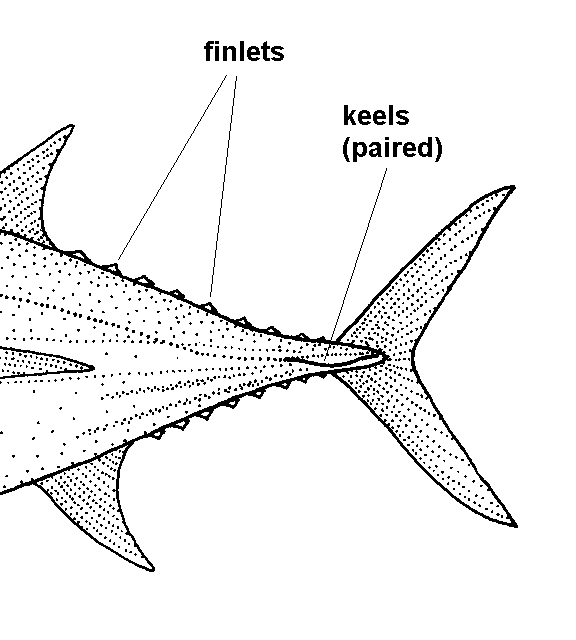
Drawing by Dr Tony Ayling

Finlets may influence the way a vortex develops around the tail fin.

Cavitation occurs when negative pressure causes bubbles (cavities) to form in a liquid, which then promptly and violently collapse. It can cause significant damage and wear. Cavitation damage can occur to the tail fins of powerful swimming marine animals, such as dolphins and tuna. Cavitation is more likely to occur near the surface of the ocean, where the ambient water pressure is relatively low. Even if they have the power to swim faster, dolphins may have to restrict their speed because collapsing cavitation bubbles on their tail are too painful. Cavitation also slows tuna, but for a different reason. Unlike dolphins, these fish do not feel the bubbles, because they have bony fins without nerve endings. Nevertheless, they cannot swim faster because the cavitation bubbles create a vapour film around their fins that limits their speed. Lesions have been found on tuna that are consistent with cavitation damage.

Scombrid fishes (tuna, mackerel and bonito) are particularly high-performance swimmers. Along the margin at the rear of their bodies is a line of small rayless, non-retractable fins, known as finlets. There has been much speculation about the function of these finlets. Research done in 2000 and 2001 by Nauen and Lauder indicated that "the finlets have a hydrodynamic effect on local flow during steady swimming" and that "the most posterior finlet is oriented to redirect flow into the developing tail vortex, which may increase thrust produced by the tail of swimming mackerel".

Fish use multiple fins, so it is possible that a given fin can have a hydrodynamic interaction with another fin. In particular, the fins immediately upstream of the caudal (tail) fin may be proximate fins that can directly affect the flow dynamics at the caudal fin. In 2011, researchers using volumetric imaging techniques were able to generate "the first instantaneous three-dimensional views of wake structures as they are produced by freely swimming fishes". They found that "continuous tail beats resulted in the formation of a linked chain of vortex rings" and that "the dorsal and anal fin wakes are rapidly entrained by the caudal fin wake, approximately within the timeframe of a subsequent tail beat".

=== Controlling motion ===
Once motion has been established, the motion itself can be controlled with the use of other fins.

Specialised fins are used to control motion

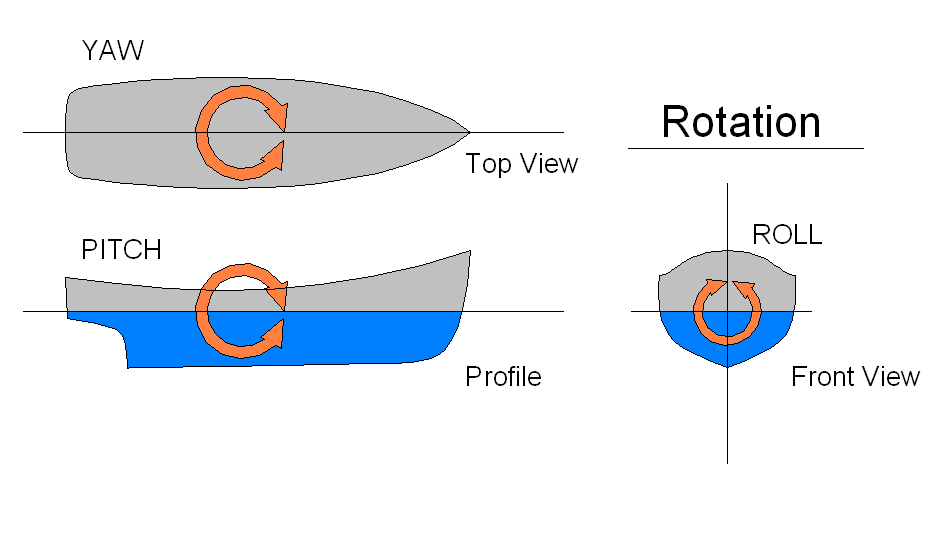
Like boats and airplanes, fish need some control over six degrees of freedom, three translational (heaving, swaying and surging) and three rotational (pitching, yawing and rolling).

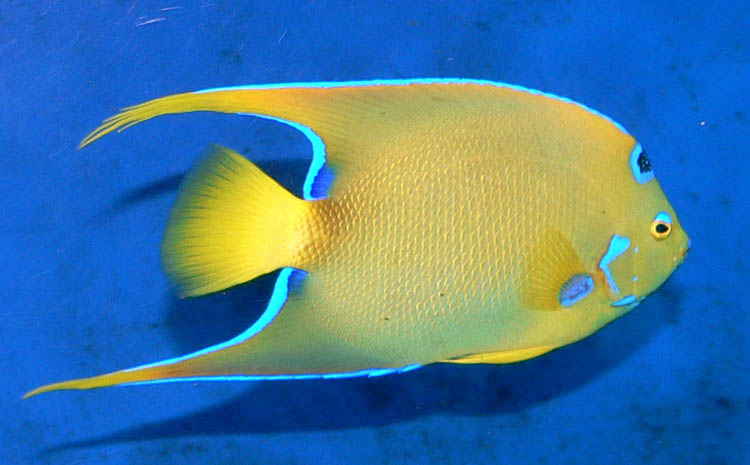
Many reef fish have pectoral and pelvic fins optimised for flattened bodies.

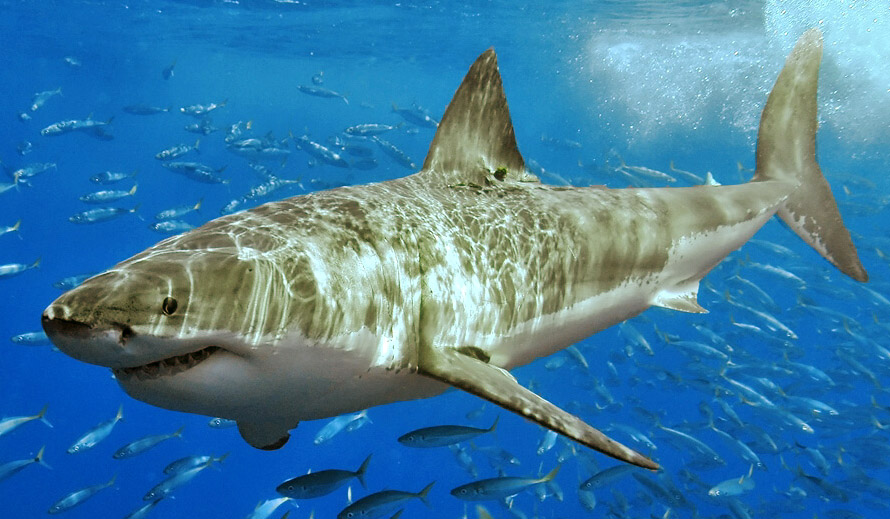
The dorsal fin of a white shark contain dermal fibers that work "like riggings that stabilize a ship's mast", and stiffen dynamically as the shark swims faster to control roll and yaw.

The bodies of reef fishes are often shaped differently from open water fishes. Open water fishes are usually built for speed, streamlined like torpedoes to minimise friction as they move through the water. Reef fish operate in the relatively confined spaces and complex underwater landscapes of coral reefs. For this manoeuvrability is more important than straight line speed, so coral reef fish have developed bodies which optimise their ability to dart and change direction. They outwit predators by dodging into fissures in the reef or playing hide and seek around coral heads. The pectoral and pelvic fins of many reef fish, such as butterflyfish, damselfish and angelfish, have evolved so they can act as brakes and allow complex manoeuvres. Many reef fish, such as butterflyfish, damselfish and angelfish, have evolved bodies which are deep and laterally compressed like a pancake, and will fit into fissures in rocks. Their pelvic and pectoral fins have evolved differently, so they act together with the flattened body to optimise manoeuvrability. Some fishes, such as puffer fish, filefish and trunkfish, rely on pectoral fins for swimming and hardly use tail fins at all.

=== Reproduction ===
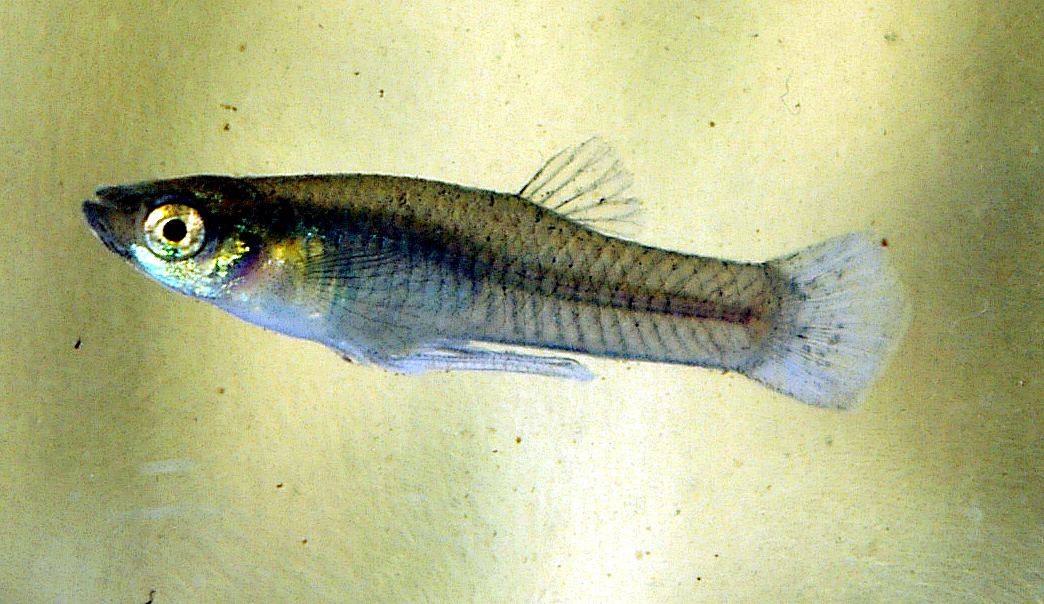
This male mosquitofish has a gonopodium, an anal fin which functions as an intromittent organ.

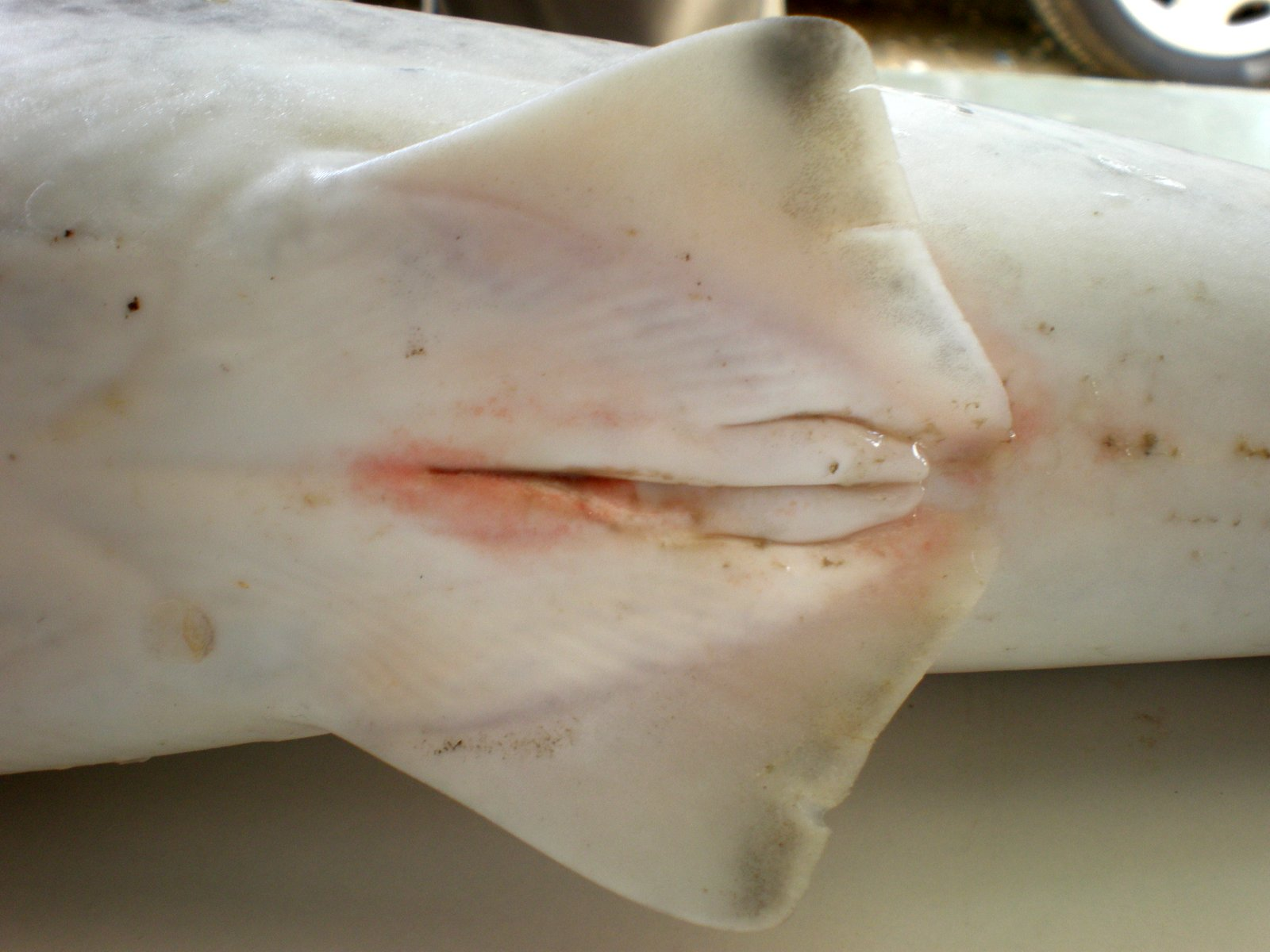
This young male spinner shark has claspers, a modification to the pelvic fins which also function as intromittent organs.

Male cartilaginous fishes (sharks and rays), as well as the males of some live-bearing ray finned fishes, have fins that have been modified to function as intromittent organs, reproductive appendages which allow internal fertilization. In ray finned fish, they are called gonopodia or andropodia, and in cartilaginous fish, they are called claspers.

Gonopodia are found on the males of some species in the Anablepidae and Poeciliidae families. They are anal fins that have been modified to function as movable intromittent organs and are used to impregnate females with milt during mating. The third, fourth and fifth rays of the male's anal fin are formed into a tube-like structure in which the sperm of the fish is ejected. When ready for mating, the gonopodium becomes erect and points forward towards the female. The male shortly inserts the organ into the sex opening of the female, with hook-like adaptations that allow the fish to grip onto the female to ensure impregnation. If a female remains stationary and her partner contacts her vent with his gonopodium, she is fertilised. The sperm is preserved in the female's oviduct. This allows females to fertilise themselves at any time without further assistance from males. In some species, the gonopodium may be half the total body length. Occasionally, the fin is too long to be used, as in the "lyretail" breeds of Xiphophorus helleri. Hormone treated females may develop gonopodia. These are useless for breeding.

Similar organs with similar characteristics are found in other fishes, for example the andropodium in the Hemirhamphodon or in the Goodeidae or the gonopodium in the Middle Triassic †Saurichthys, the oldest known example of viviparity in a ray-finned fish.

Claspers are found on the males of cartilaginous fishes. They are the posterior part of the pelvic fins that have also been modified to function as intromittent organs, and are used to channel semen into the female's cloaca during copulation. The act of mating in sharks usually includes raising one of the claspers to allow water into a siphon through a specific orifice. The clasper is then inserted into the cloaca, where it opens like an umbrella to anchor its position. The siphon then begins to contract expelling water and sperm.

=== Other functions ===
Other uses of fins include walking and perching on the sea floor, gliding over water, cooling of body temperature, stunning of prey, display (scaring of predators, courtship), defence (venomous fin spines, locking between corals), luring of prey, and attachment structures.

The Indo-Pacific sailfish has a prominent dorsal fin. Like scombroids and other billfish, they streamline themselves by retracting their dorsal fins into a groove in their body when they swim. The huge dorsal fin, or sail, of the sailfish is kept retracted most of the time. Sailfish raise them if they want to herd a school of small fish, and also after periods of high activity, presumably to cool down.

Other uses of fins

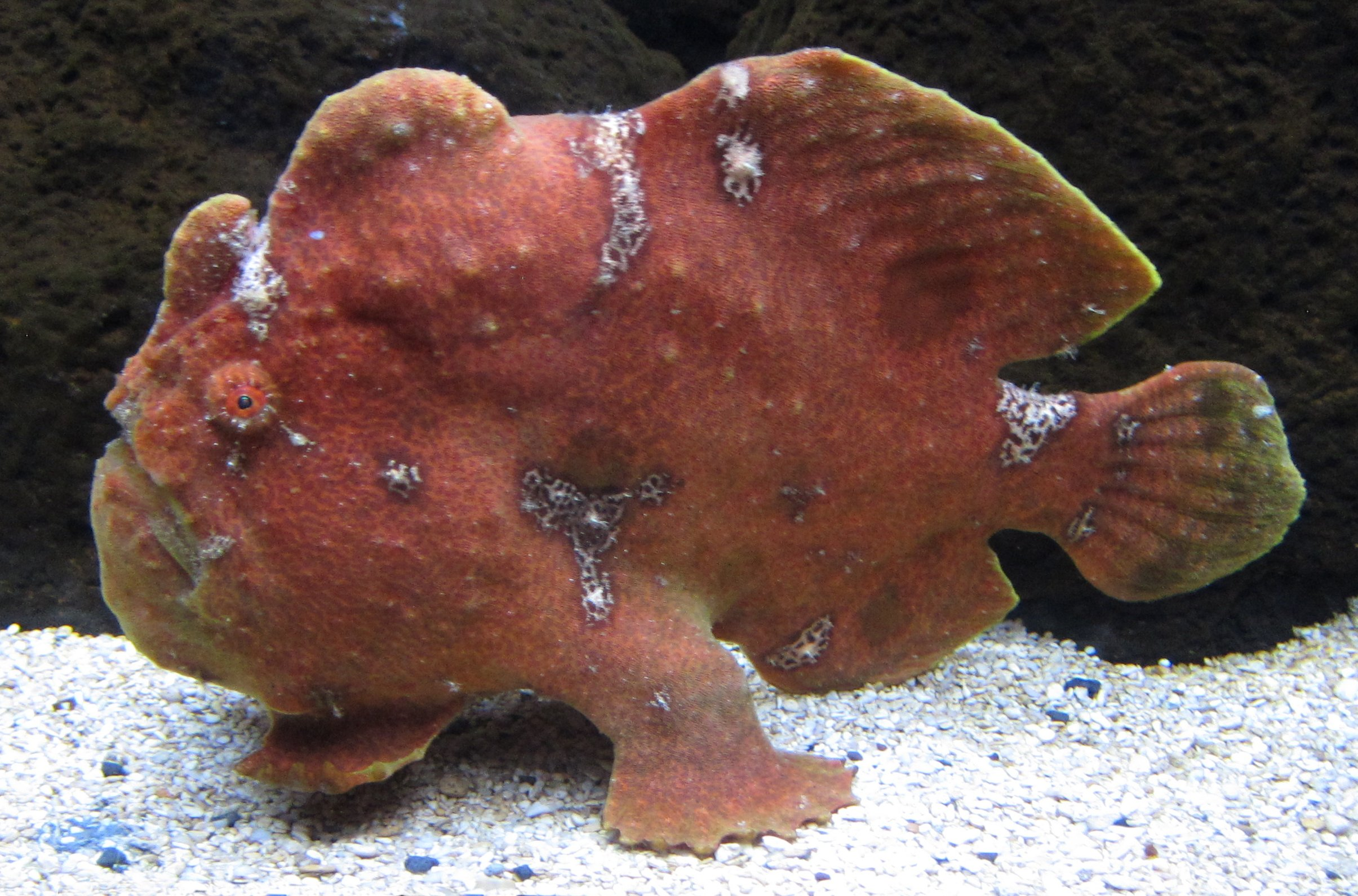
Frogfish use their pectoral and pelvic fins to walk along the ocean bottom.

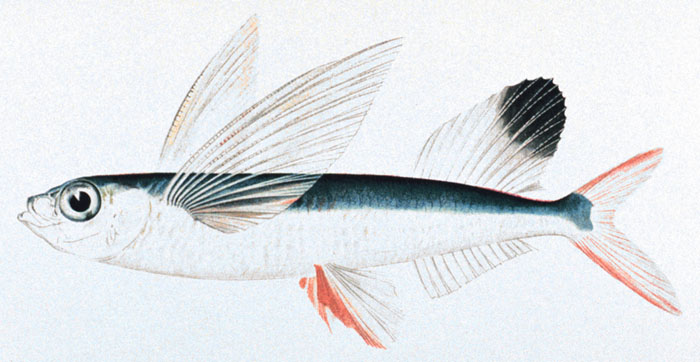
Flying fish achieve sufficient lift to glide above the surface of the water thanks to their enlarged pectoral fins.

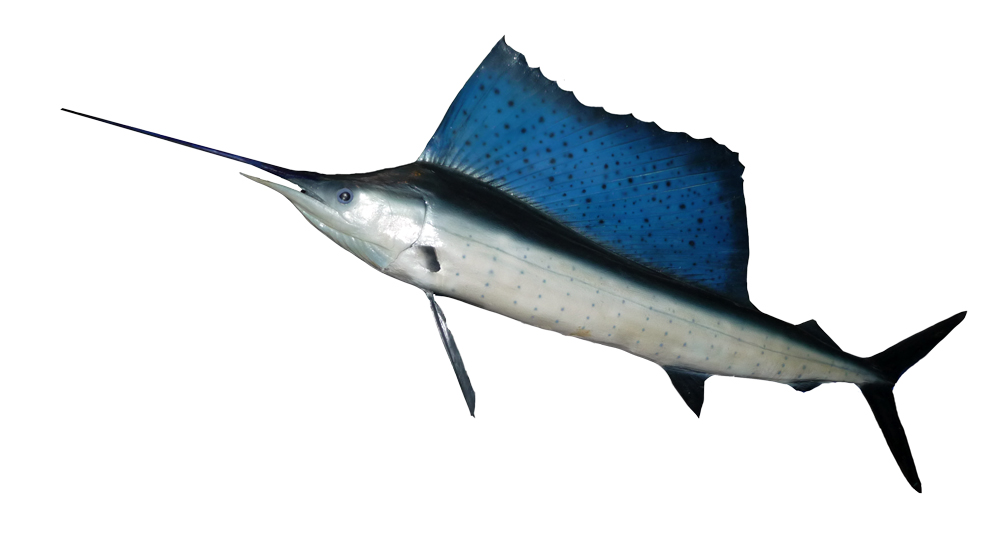
Large retractable dorsal fin of the Indo-Pacific sailfish, possibly used for cooling (thermoregulation).

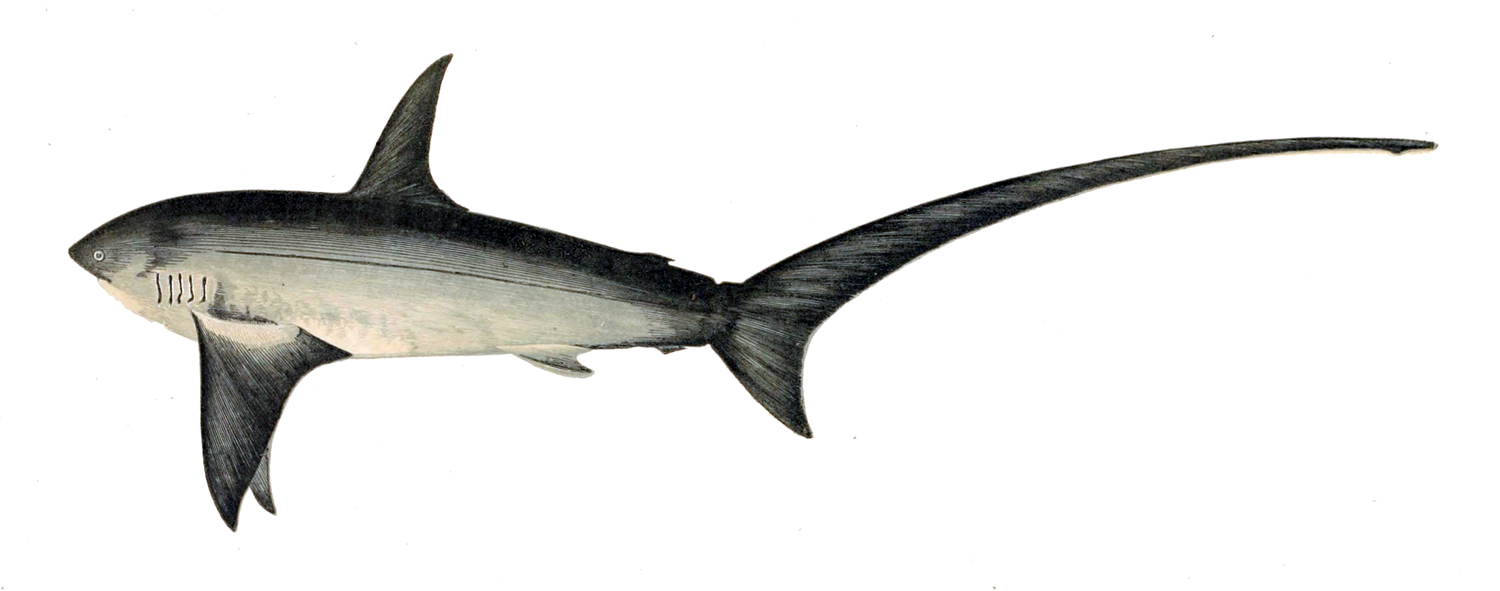
The thresher shark uses its very elongated caudal fin to stun prey.

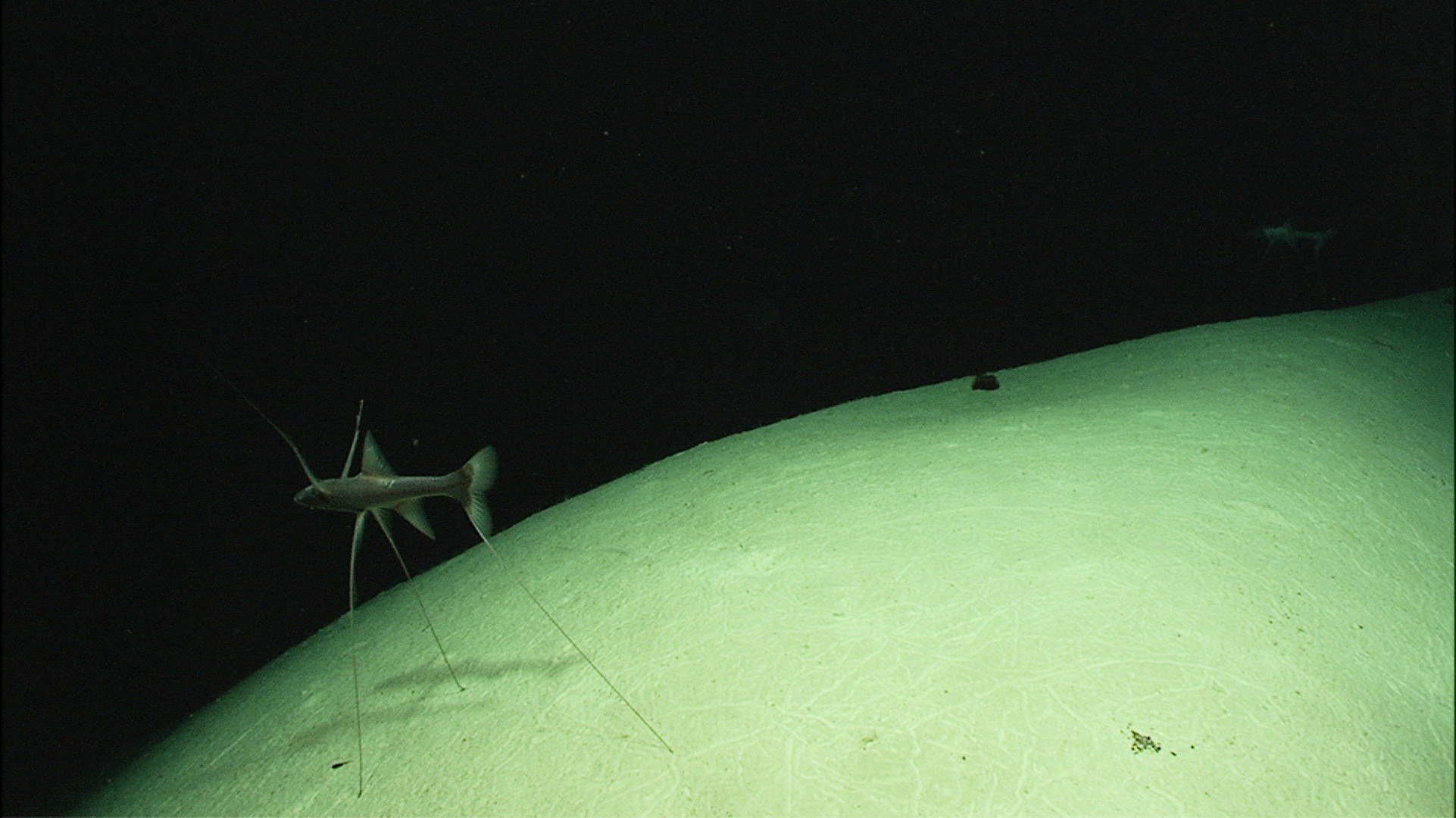
Species of tripod fish Bathypterois have elongated pectoral and pelvic fins, and an elongated caudal fin, which allow them to move and perch on the ocean floor.

The oriental flying gurnard has large pectoral fins which it normally holds against its body, and expands when threatened to scare predators. Despite its name, it is a demersal fish, not a flying fish, and uses its pelvic fins to walk along the bottom of the ocean.

Fins can have an adaptive significance as sexual ornaments. During courtship, the female cichlid, Pelvicachromis taeniatus, displays a large and visually arresting purple pelvic fin. "The researchers found that males clearly preferred females with a larger pelvic fin and that pelvic fins grew in a more disproportionate way than other fins on female fish."

Other uses of fins

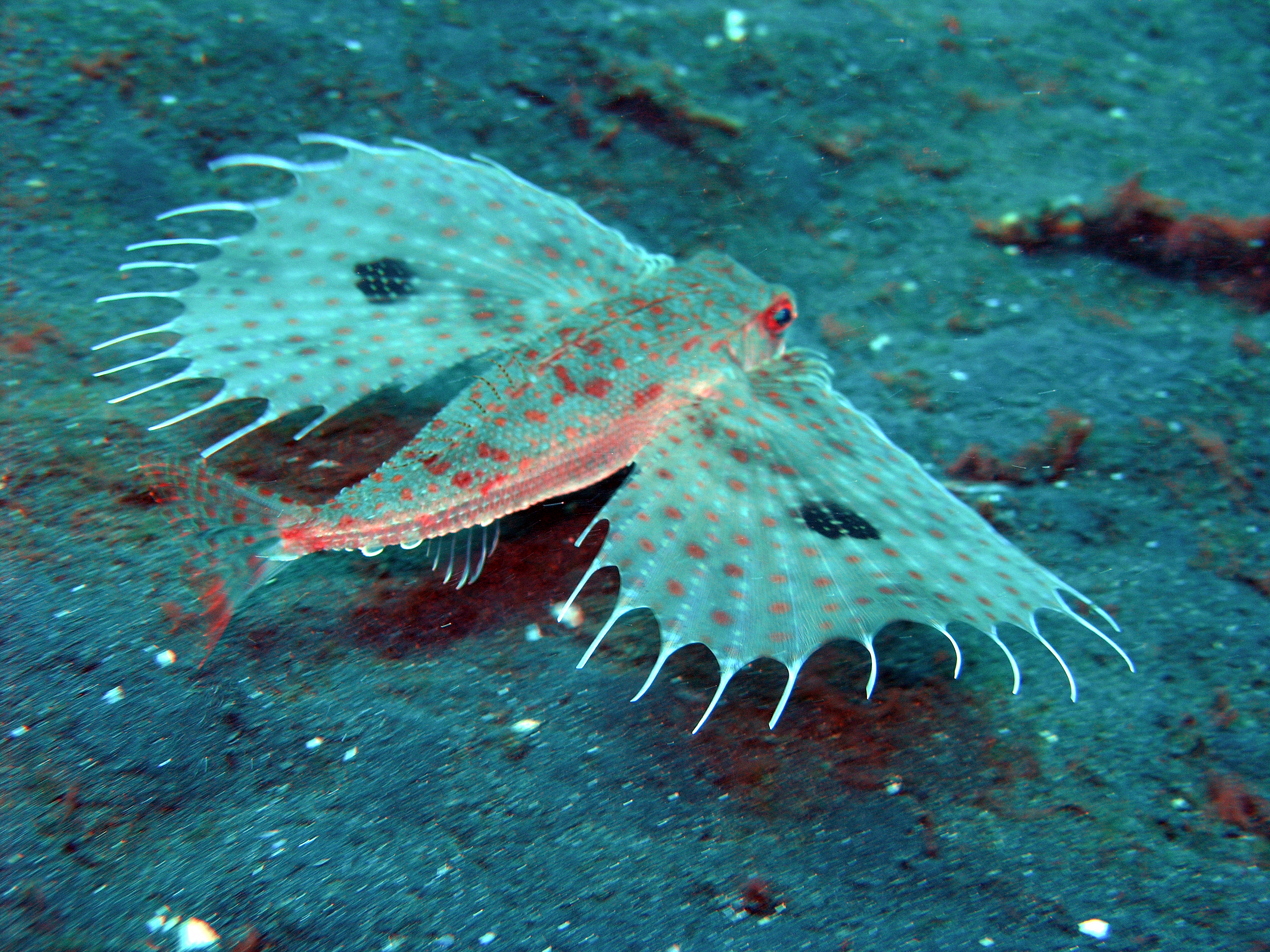
The Oriental flying gurnard has large pectoral fins with eye spots which it displays to scare predators.

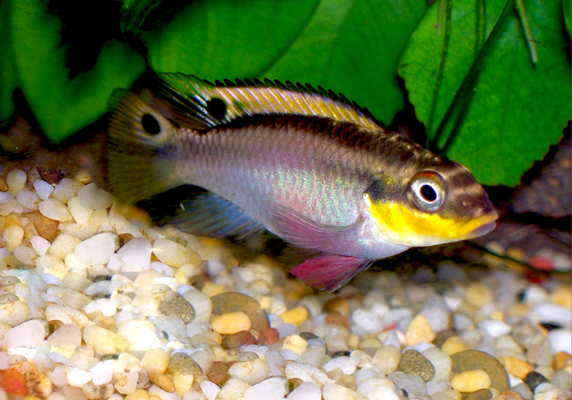
During courtship, the female cichlid, Pelvicachromis taeniatus, displays her visually arresting purple pelvic fin.

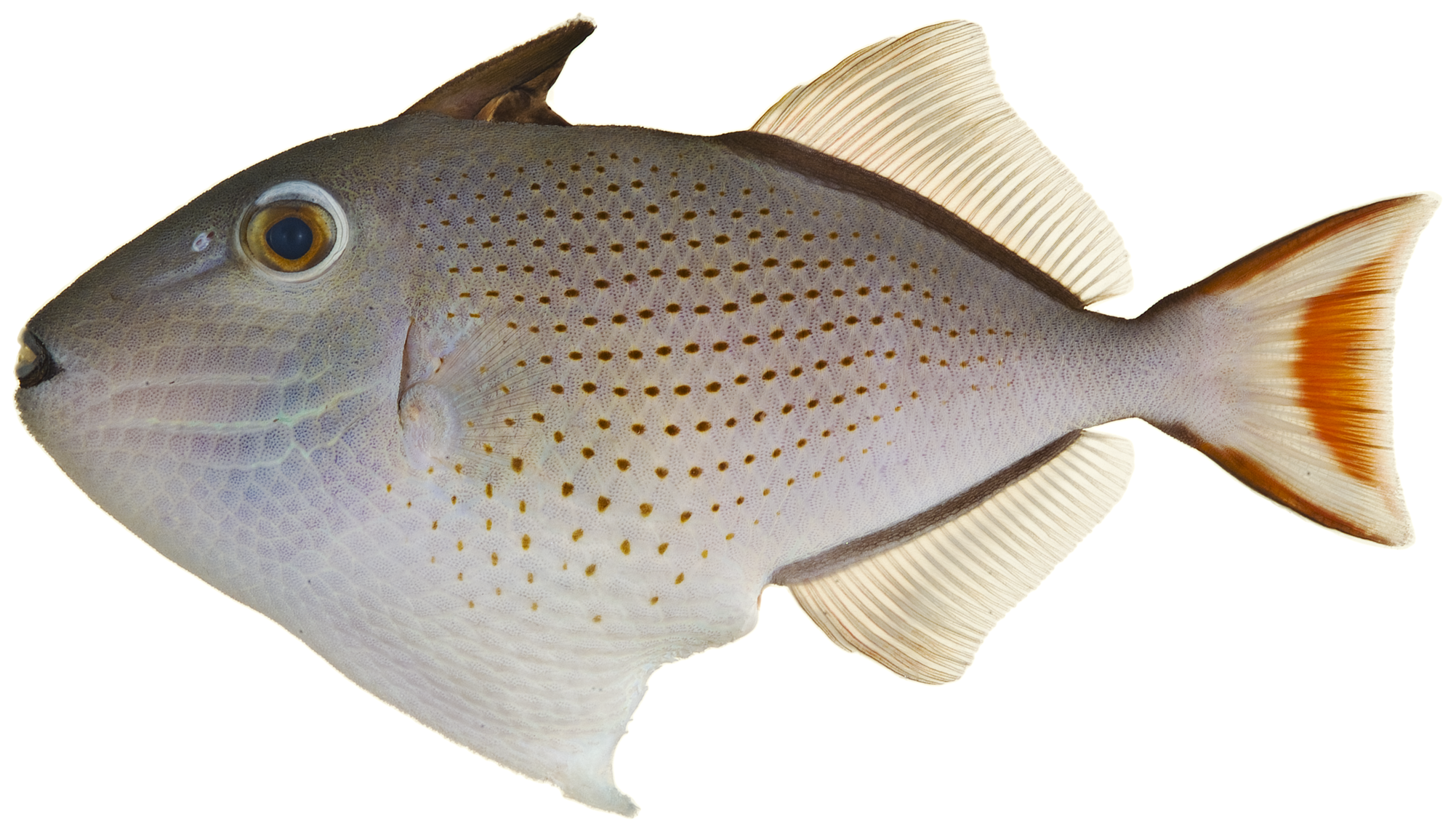
Triggerfish squeeze into coral crevices to avoid predators, and lock themselves in place with the first spine of their dorsal fin.

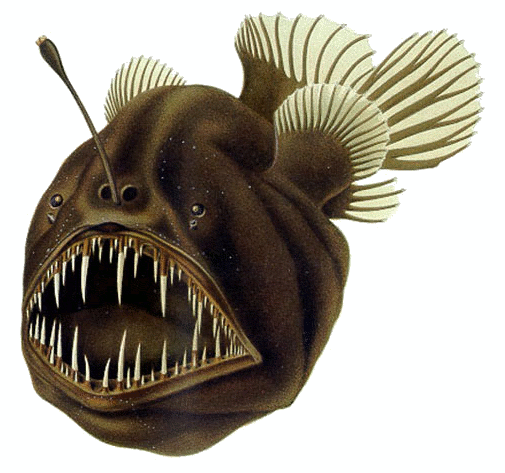
The first spine of the dorsal fin of the anglerfish is modified so it functions like a fishing rod with a lure to attract prey.

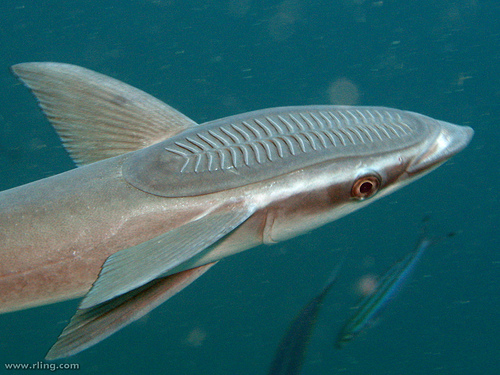
Remoras have modified first dorsal fins, which take the form of an oval, sucker-like organ with which they attach themselves to other marine organisms.

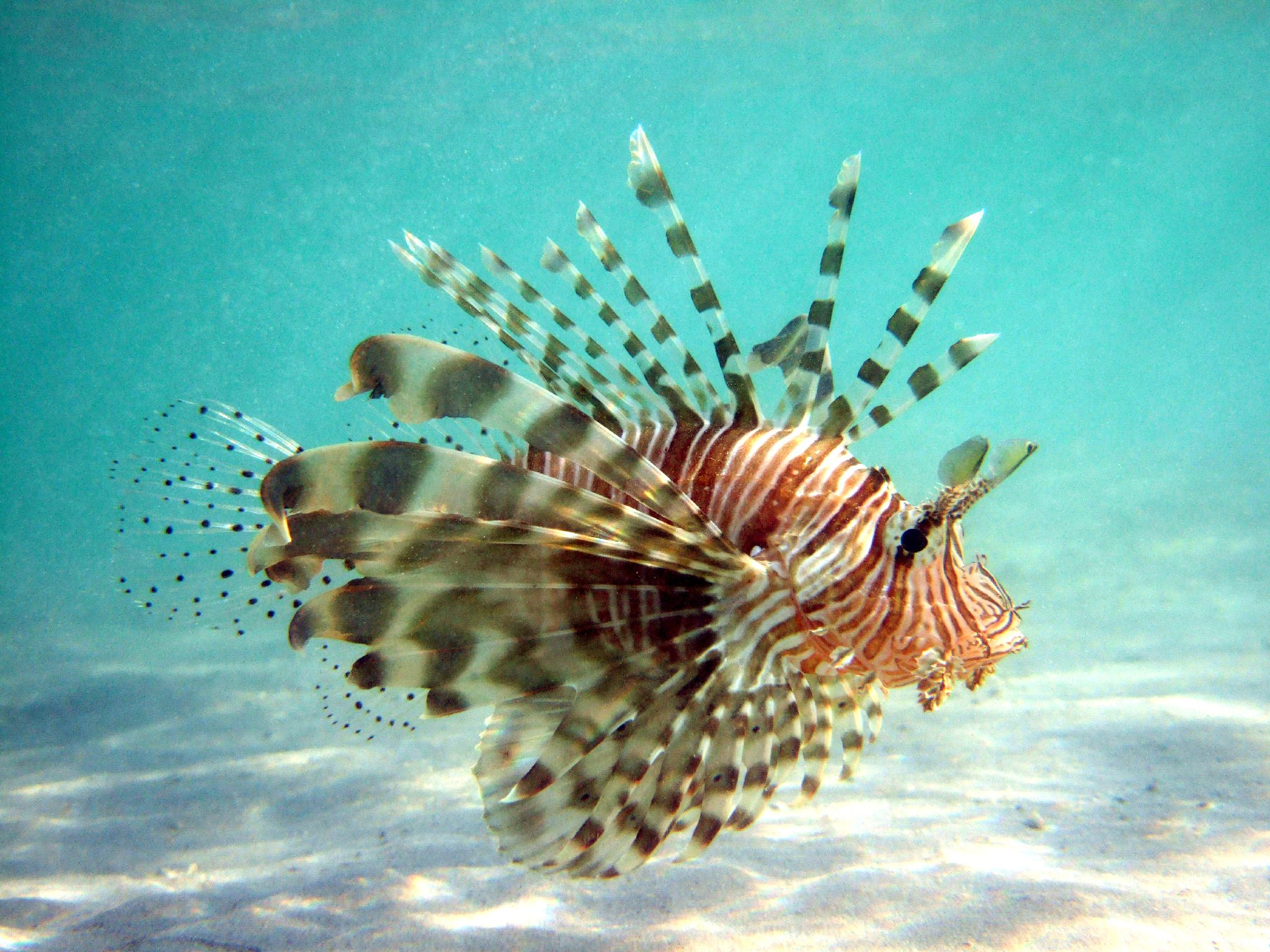
Lionfish have venomous spines (fin rays) on their dorsal, pelvic and anal fins, which they use for defense.

== Evolution ==
=== Evolution of paired fins ===
There are two prevailing hypotheses that have been historically debated as models for the evolution of paired fins in fish: the gill arch theory and the lateral fin-fold theory. The former, commonly referred to as the "Gegenbaur hypothesis," was posited in 1870 and proposes that the "paired fins are derived from gill structures". This fell out of popularity in favour of the lateral fin-fold theory, first suggested in 1877, which proposes that paired fins budded from longitudinal, lateral folds along the epidermis just behind the gills. There is weak support for both hypotheses in the fossil record and in embryology. However, recent insights from developmental patterning have prompted reconsideration of both theories in order to better elucidate the origins of paired fins.

==== Classical theories ====
Carl Gegenbaur's concept of the "Archipterygium" was introduced in 1876. It was described as a gill ray, or "joined cartilaginous stem," that extended from the gill arch. Additional rays arose from along the arch and from the central gill ray. Gegenbaur suggested a model of transformative homology – that all vertebrate paired fins and limbs were transformations of the archipterygium. Based on this theory, paired appendages such as pectoral and pelvic fins would have differentiated from the branchial arches and migrated posteriorly. However, there has been limited support for this hypothesis in the fossil record both morphologically and phylogenically. In addition, there was little to no evidence of an anterior-posterior migration of pelvic fins. Such shortcomings of the gill-arch theory led to its early demise in favour of the lateral fin-fold theory proposed by St. George Jackson Mivart, Francis Balfour, and James Kingsley Thacher.

The lateral fin-fold theory hypothesised that paired fins developed from lateral folds along the body wall of the fish. Just as segmentation and budding of the median fin fold gave rise to the median fins, a similar mechanism of fin bud segmentation and elongation from a lateral fin fold was proposed to have given rise to the paired pectoral and pelvic fins. However, there was little evidence of a lateral fold-to-fin transition in the fossil record. In addition, it was later demonstrated phylogenically that pectoral and pelvic fins arise from distinct evolutionary and mechanistic origins.

==== Evolutionary developmental biology ====
Recent studies in the ontogeny and evolution of paired appendages have compared finless vertebrates – such as lampreys – with Chondrichthyes, the most basal living vertebrate with paired fins. In 2006, researchers found that the same genetic programming involved in the segmentation and development of median fins was found in the development of paired appendages in catsharks. Although these findings do not directly support the lateral fin-fold hypothesis, the original concept of a shared median-paired fin evolutionary developmental mechanism remains relevant.

A similar renovation of an old theory may be found in the developmental programming of chondrichthyan gill arches and paired appendages. In 2009, researchers at the University of Chicago demonstrated that there are shared molecular patterning mechanisms in the early development of the chondrichthyan gill arch and paired fins. Findings such as these have prompted reconsideration of the once-debunked gill-arch theory.

=== From fins to limbs ===
Fish are the ancestors of all mammals, reptiles, birds and amphibians. In particular, terrestrial tetrapods (four-legged animals) evolved from fish and made their first forays onto land about 390 million years ago. They used paired pectoral and pelvic fins for locomotion. The pectoral fins developed into forelegs (arms in the case of humans) and the pelvic fins developed into hind legs. Much of the genetic machinery that builds a walking limb in a tetrapod is already present in the swimming fin of a fish.

Aristotle recognised the distinction between analogous and homologous structures, and made the following prophetic comparison: "Birds in a way resemble fishes. For birds have their wings in the upper part of their bodies and fishes have two fins in the front part of their bodies. Birds have feet on their underpart and most fishes have a second pair of fins in their under-part and near their front fins."

— Aristotle, De incessu animalium

Comparison between A) the swimming fin of a lobe-finned fish and B) the walking leg of a tetrapod. Bones considered to correspond with each other have the same colour.

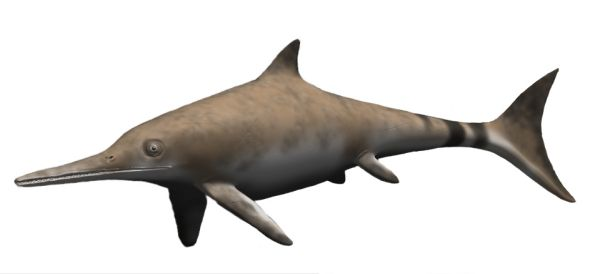
In a parallel but independent evolution, the ancient reptile †Ichthyosaurus communis developed fins (or flippers) very similar to fish (or dolphins).

In 2011, researchers at Monash University in Australia used primitive but still living lungfish "to trace the evolution of pelvic fin muscles to find out how the load-bearing hind limbs of the tetrapods evolved." Further research at the University of Chicago found bottom-walking lungfishes had already evolved characteristics of the walking gaits of terrestrial tetrapods.

In a classic example of convergent evolution, the pectoral limbs of pterosaurs, birds and bats further evolved along independent paths into flying wings. Even with flying wings, there are many similarities with walking legs, and core aspects of the genetic blueprint of the pectoral fin have been retained.

The first mammals appeared during the Triassic period (between 251.9 and 201.4 million years ago). Several groups of these mammals started returning to the sea, including the cetaceans (whales, dolphins and porpoises). Recent DNA analysis suggests that cetaceans evolved from within the even-toed ungulates, and that they share a common ancestor with the hippopotamus. About 23 million years ago, another group of bearlike land mammals started returning to the sea. These were the seals. What had become walking limbs in cetaceans and seals evolved independently into new forms of swimming fins. The forelimbs became flippers, while the hindlimbs were either lost (cetaceans) or also modified into flipper (pinnipeds). In cetaceans, the tail gained two fins at the end, called a fluke. Fish tails are usually vertical and move from side to side. Cetacean flukes are horizontal and move up and down, because cetacean spines bend the same way as in other mammals.

Similar adaptations for fully aquatic lifestyle are found both in dolphins and ichthyosaurs.

Ichthyosaurs are ancient reptiles that resembled dolphins. They first appeared about 245 million years ago and disappeared about 90 million years ago.

"This sea-going reptile with terrestrial ancestors converged so strongly on fishes that it actually evolved a dorsal fin and tail fin for improved aquatic locomotion. These structures are all the more remarkable because they evolved from nothing — the ancestral terrestrial reptile had no hump on its back or blade on its tail to serve as a precursor."

The biologist Stephen Jay Gould said the ichthyosaur was his favourite example of convergent evolution.

Fins or flippers of varying forms and at varying locations (limbs, body, tail) have also evolved in a number of other tetrapod groups, including diving birds such as penguins (modified from wings), sea turtles (forelimbs modified into flippers), mosasaurs (limbs modified into flippers), and sea snakes (vertically expanded, flattened tail fin).

== Robotic fins ==
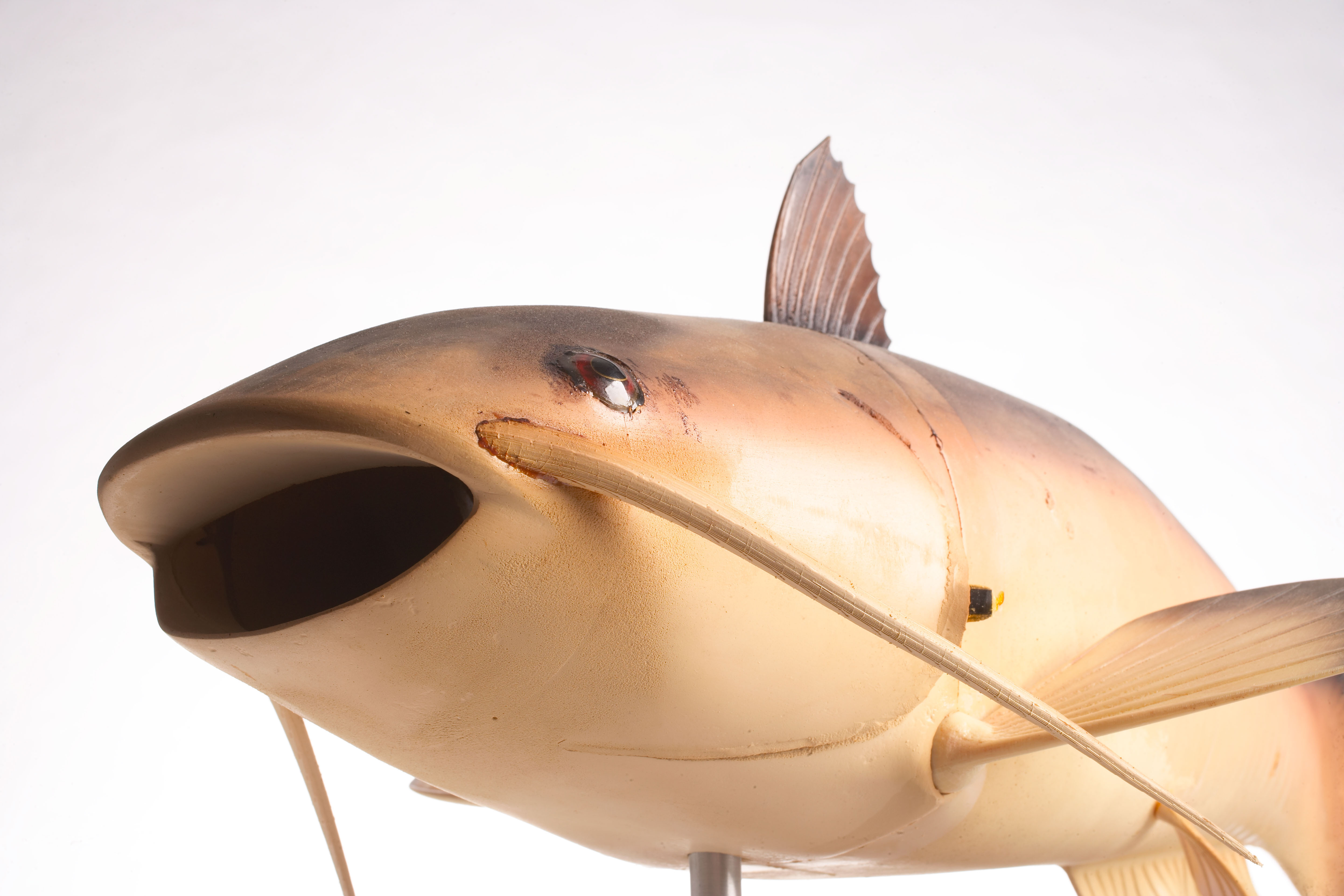
In the 1990s, the CIA built a robotic catfish called Charlie, designed to collect underwater intelligence undetected. External videos: AquaPenguin - Festo, YouTube; AquaRay - Festo, YouTube; AquaJelly - Festo, YouTube; AiraCuda - Festo, YouTube

The use of fins for the propulsion of aquatic animals can be remarkably effective. It has been calculated that some fish can achieve a propulsive efficiency greater than 90%. Fish can accelerate and manoeuvre much more effectively than boats or submarine, and produce less water disturbance and noise. This has led to biomimetic studies of underwater robots which attempt to emulate the locomotion of aquatic animals. An example is the Robot Tuna built by the Institute of Field Robotics, to analyse and mathematically model thunniform motion. In 2005, the Sea Life London Aquarium displayed three robotic fish created by the computer science department at the University of Essex. The fish were designed to be autonomous, swimming around and avoiding obstacles like real fish. Their creator claimed that he was trying to combine "the speed of tuna, acceleration of a pike, and the navigating skills of an eel."

The AquaPenguin, developed by Festo of Germany, copies the streamlined shape and propulsion by front flippers of penguins. Festo also developed AquaRay, AquaJelly and AiraCuda, respectively emulating the locomotion of manta rays, jellyfish and barracuda.

In 2004, Hugh Herr at MIT prototyped a biomechatronic robotic fish with a living actuator by surgically transplanting muscles from frog legs to the robot and then making the robot swim by pulsing the muscle fibres with electricity.

Robotic fish offer some research advantages, such as the ability to examine an individual part of a fish design in isolation from the rest of the fish. However, this risks oversimplifying the biology so key aspects of the animal design are overlooked. Robotic fish also allow researchers to vary a single parameter, such as flexibility or a specific motion control. Researchers can directly measure forces, which is not easy to do in live fish. "Robotic devices also facilitate three-dimensional kinematic studies and correlated hydrodynamic analyses, as the location of the locomotor surface can be known accurately. And, individual components of a natural motion (such as outstroke vs. instroke of a flapping appendage) can be programmed separately, which is certainly difficult to achieve when working with a live animal."

== See also ==
- Cephalopod fin
- Fin and flipper locomotion
- Fish locomotion
- Polydactyly in early tetrapods
- RoboTuna
- Shark fin soup
- Tradeoffs for locomotion in air and water
- Undulatory locomotion
