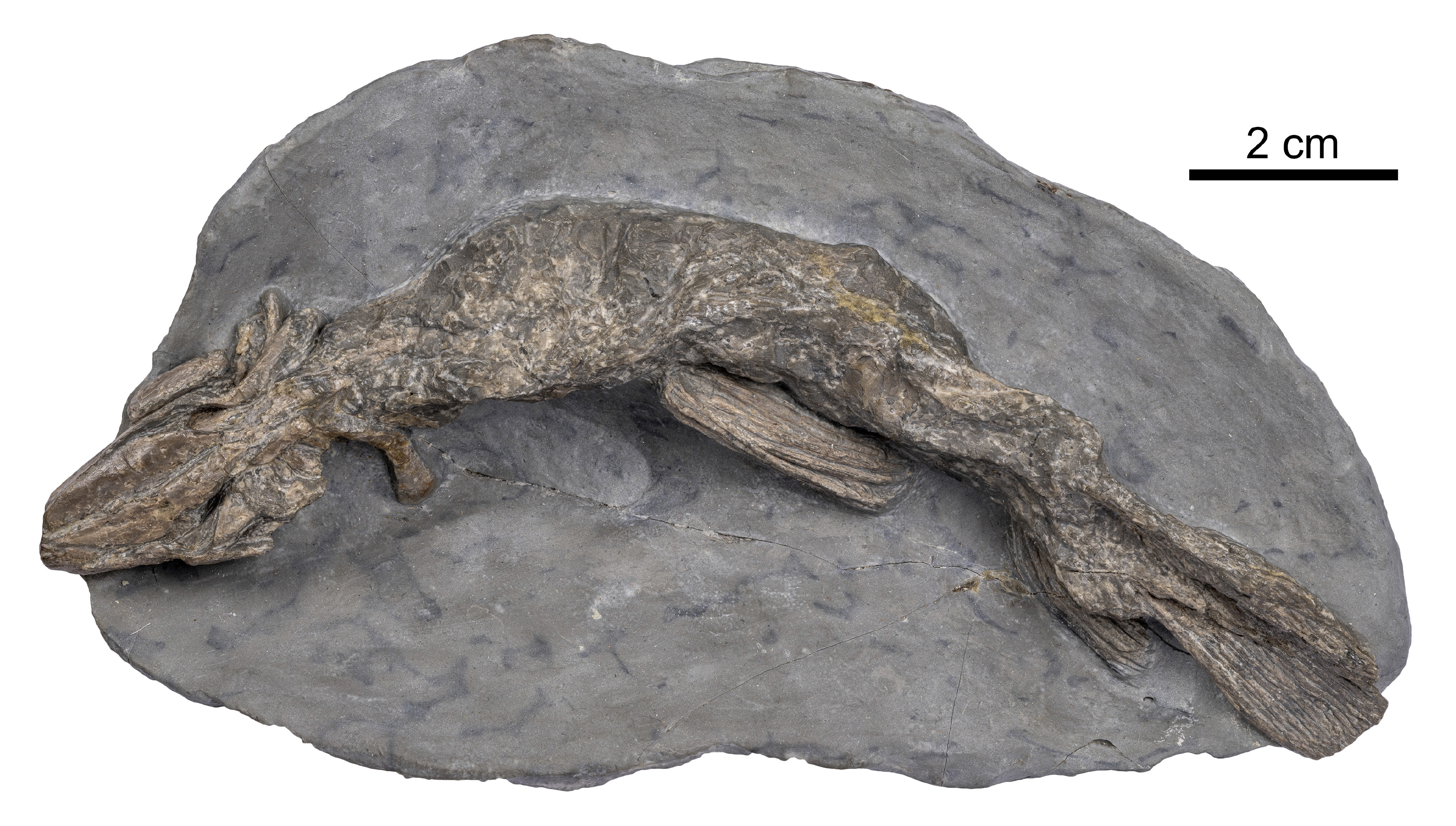
- L. eucinglulata holotype specimen
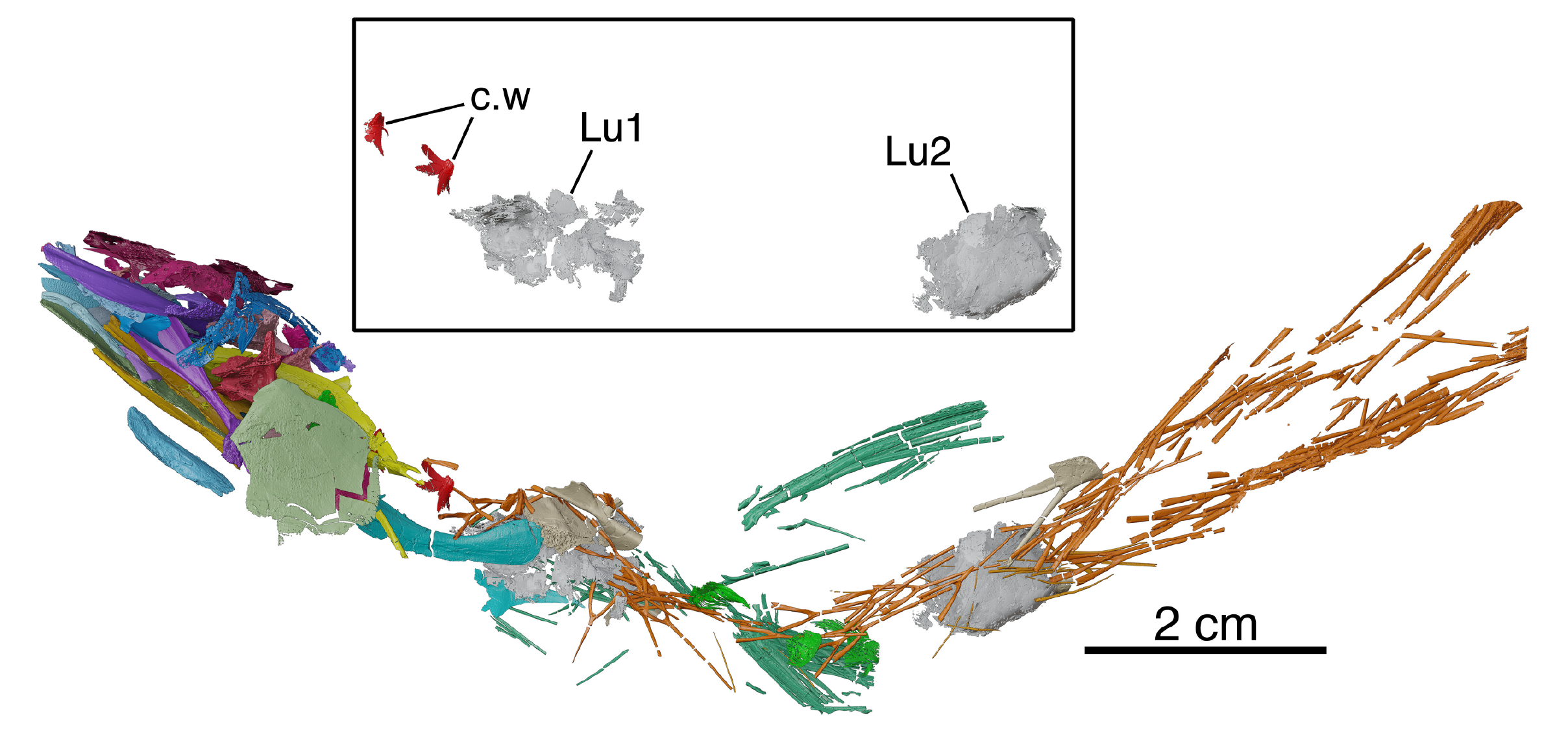
- Digital model of the L. eucinglulata holotype

Scientific classification
- Kingdom: Animalia
- Phylum: Chordata
- Class: Actinistia
- Order: Coelacanthiformes
- Suborder: Latimerioidei
- Family: incertae sedis
- Genus: †Loreleia; Manuelli et al., 2026
- Species: †L. eucingulata

Binomial name
- †Loreleia eucingulata Manuelli et al., 2026

= Loreleia eucingulata =

Loreleia eucingulata Temporal range: early Middle Triassic (Ladinian), ~242–237 Ma

Species of extinct coelacanth

Loreleia eucingulata is an extinct species of coelacanth lobe-finned fish known from the Middle Triassic (Ladinian age) Calcaire à Cératites Formation of France. It is the only species in the genus Loreleia, known from a well-preserved, articulated skull and skeleton. Using microCT scans, an ossified lung was identified in this species and the closely related Graulia branchiodonta, known from the same formation. This structure may have allowed it to transmit sound pressure from the lung to the inner ear.

== Discovery and naming ==
The Loreleia fossil material was discovered in outcrops of the Calcaire à Cératites Formation—part of the Muschelkalk assigned to the Ceratites praenodosus biozone—near Sarraltroff in Moselle, France. The specimen is housed in the Natural History Museum of Geneva, where it is permanently accessioned as specimen MHNG-GEPI-V5789. The specimen consists of a nearly complete skeleton and skull preserved in anatomical articulation.

In 2026, Luigi Manuelli and colleagues described Loreleia eucingulata as a new genus and species of fossil coelacanth (order Coelacanthiformes) based on these fossil remains, establishing MHNG-GEPI-V5789 as the holotype specimen. The generic name, Loreleia, alludes to the mythical figure Loreley in Lorraine folklore, the French region near the type locality. The specific name, eucingulata, combines the Greek prefix εὖ (eu-), meaning 'prominent' or 'well', with the Latin word cingulum, meaning 'belt' or 'girdle', in references to the elongate pectoral girdle observed in this species.

== Classification ==
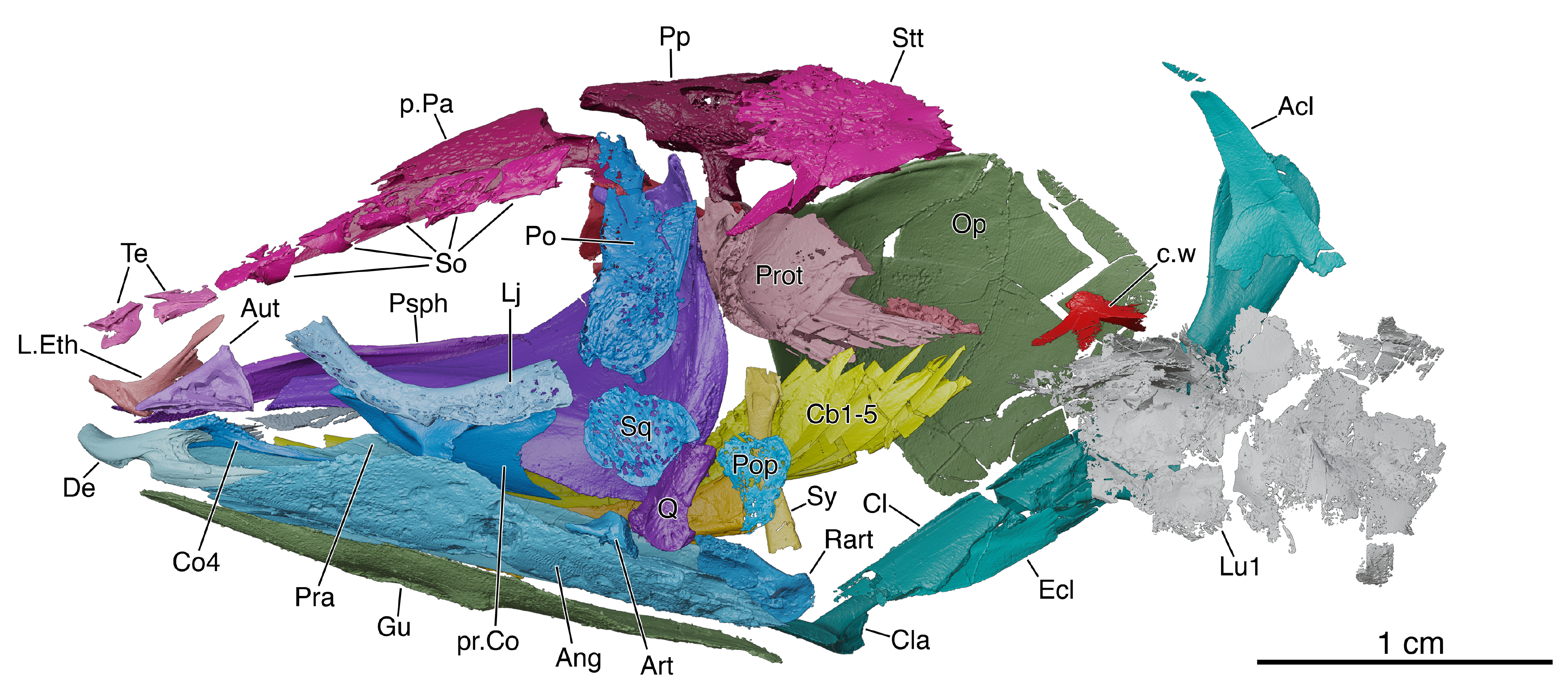
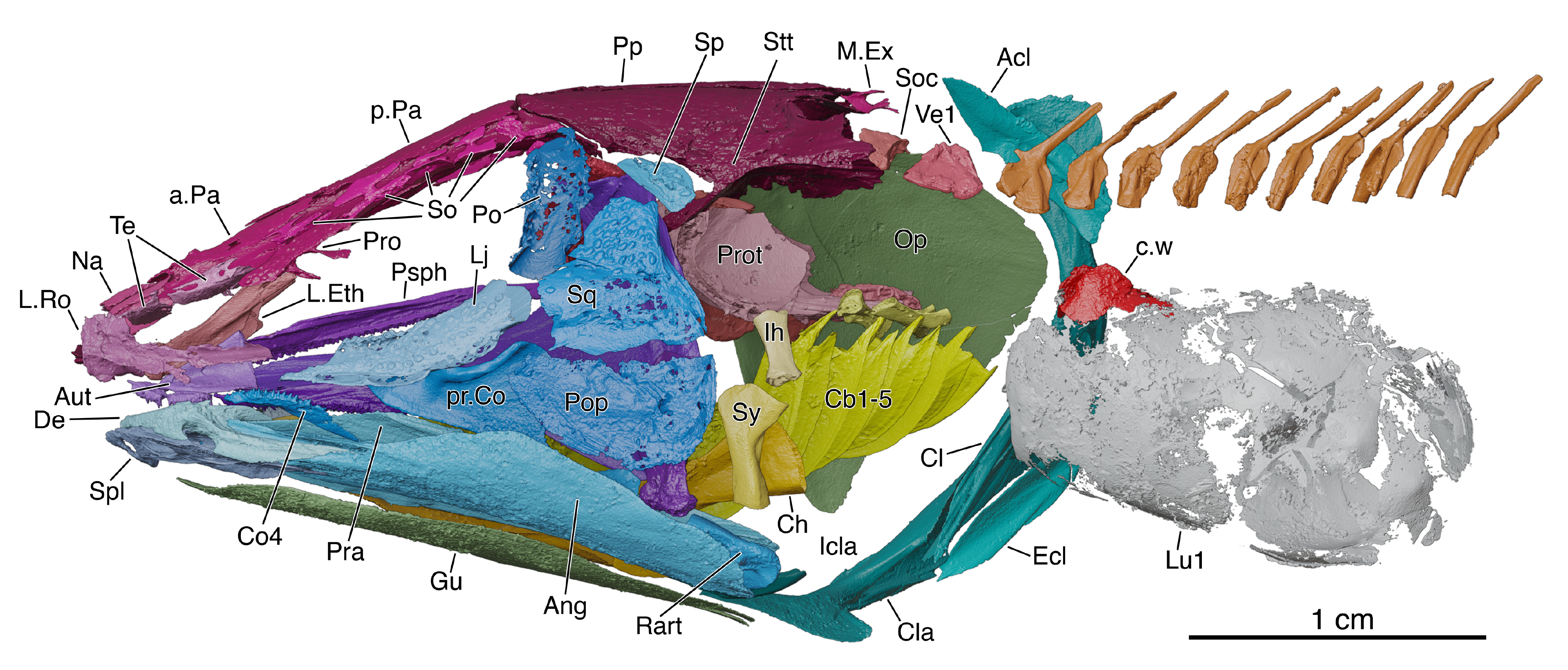
Reconstructed skulls of Loreleia eucingulata (top) and the closely related Graulia branchiodonta (bottom): annotated skulls (left) and rotating virtual reconstruction (right).

To test the affinities and relationships of Loreleia, Mannuelli and colleagues (2026) scored it in the phylogenetic matrix of Ferrante & Cavin (2025). They recovered Loreleia alongside the coeval Graulia and the Early Triassic Dobrogeria of Romania, in an unresolved polytomy at the base of Latimeriidae (the family containing the modern coelacanth genus, Latimeria). The authors remarked that previous phylgoenetic work had identified Graulia as a member of the family Mawsoniidae, which forms the sister group to Latimeriidae. They concluded that the precise relationships of the basalmost mawoniid and latimeriid taxa are not stable, and that Loreleia, Graulia, and Dobrogeria should be regarded as basal Latimerioidei incertae sedis, pending more detailed analyses in the future. The results of their phylogenetic analysis are shown in the cladogram below:

- Actinistia
  - †Miguashaiidae
    ⊞
    - †Gavinia
    - †Miguashaia
    ⊟
  - - †Diplocercidae
      ⊞
      - †Lochmocercus
      - †Serenichthys
      - - †Allenypterus
        - †Holopterygius
      - - †Ngamugawi
        - - †Diplocercides
          - †Euporosteus
      ⊟
    - - - †Hadronectoridae
          ⊞
          - †Hadronector
          - †Polyosteorhynchus
          ⊟
        - - †Sassenia
          - - †Rhabdodermatidae
              ⊞
              - †Spermatodus
              - - †Caridosuctor
                - †Rhabdoderma
              ⊟
            - Coelacanthiformes
              - †Coelacanthus
              - - †Rebellatrix
                - - †Laugiidae
                    ⊞
                    - †Piveteauia
                    - - †Coccoderma
                      - †Laugia
                    ⊟
                  - - †Whiteiidae
                      ⊞
                      - †Whiteia
                      - - †Garnbergia
                        - †Guizhoucoelacanthus
                      ⊟
                    - - †Axeliidae
                        ⊞
                        - †Atacamaia
                        - †Axelia
                        - †Wimania
                        ⊟
                      - Latimerioidei
                        - †Mawsoniidae
                          ⊞
                          - †Indocoelacanthus
                          - - †Diplurinae
                              - †Diplurus
                              - †Heptanema
                              - †Reidus
                            - †Mawsoniinae
                              - †Chinlea
                              - †Parnaibaia
                              - - Axelrodichthys
                                - †Lualabaea
                                - †Mawsonia
                                - †Trachymetopon
                          ⊟
                        - Latimeriidae
                          - †Dobrogeria
                          - †Graulia
                          - †Loreleia
                          - - †Ticinepomiinae
                              ⊞
                              - †Ticinepomis
                              - - †Foreyia
                                - †Rieppelia
                              ⊟
                            - Latimeriinae
                              - †Undina
                              - - †Holophagus
                                - - - Latimeria
                                    - †Swenzia
                                  - - †Macropoma
                                    - - †Libys
                                      - †Megalocoelacanthus
