= Atacamaia =

Atacamaia Temporal range: Early Jurassic (Sinemurian)
- Skull diagram

Scientific classification
- Kingdom: Animalia
- Phylum: Chordata
- Class: Actinistia
- Order: Coelacanthiformes
- Family: †Axeliidae
- Genus: †Atacamaia; Arratia & Schultze, 2015
- Species: †A. solitaria

Binomial name
- †Atacamaia solitaria Arratia & Schultze, 2015

Extinct genus of fishes

Atacamaia is an extinct genus of marine coelacanth from the Early Jurassic of Chile. The sole known species, Atacamaia solitaria, was discovered in the Atacama Desert, specifically in the Vaquillas Altas locality, dating to the Sinemurian stage. It is notable for being the first Mesozoic coelacanth found on the Pacific side of Gondwana.

== Taxonomy ==
Atacamaia belongs to the order Coelacanthiformes, the group encompassing most Mesozoic coelacanths. Prior to its description, it was thought to belong to the family Mawsoniidae. In 2015, it was formally described by Gloria Arratia and Hans-Peter Schultze, who noted its close morphological resemblance to Axelia and Wimania from the Early Triassic of Svalbard. All three genera were reclassified into the family Whiteiidae, a family which was previously only known from the Triassic, which would have made Atacamaia the youngest known member of this lineage. A 2025 taxonomic review of most fossil coelacanths reaffirmed the relationship of Atacamaia to the Triassic Svalbard coelacanths, but instead found evidence for classifying these three genera into their own family, Axeliidae, of which Atacamaia is still the youngest known member.

== Description ==
The holotype of Atacamaia solitaria was unearthed in the Vaquillas Altas locality of the Atacama Desert, Chile, during expeditions in the 1990s. Collected by Kate Shaw in 1994, the specimen originates from Sinemurian-aged strata, approximately 195 to 191 million years old. Atacamaia solitaria is represented by a partially three-dimensionally preserved head, exhibiting lateral compression, with dimensions of approximately 80 mm in length and 60 mm in depth. Distinctive cranial features include a broad parietal bone, a series of large supraorbital bones, sclerotic bones, an expanded and angled lachrymojugal, and a metapterygoid with a prominent ventral process. These traits differentiate Atacamaia from other coelacanth genera. The holotype (MNHN SGO.PV 288) skull is housed at the Museo Nacional de Historia Natural in Chile.

== Paleoecology ==
Atacamaia solitaria inhabited a marine environment during the Early Jurassic, as evidenced by the sedimentary context of the Vaquillas Altas locality. Although the Atacama Desert is now arid, it was once submerged under shallow seas that supported a diverse array of marine life, including coelacanths.
