= Sikannisuchus =

Sikannisuchus Temporal range: Upper Triassic, Norian

Scientific classification
- Domain: Eukaryota
- Kingdom: Animalia
- Phylum: Chordata
- Class: Reptilia
- Clade: Archosauromorpha
- Clade: Archosauriformes
- Clade: Archosauria
- Genus: †Sikannisuchus; Nicholls, Brinkman & Wu, 1998

Species
- †S. huskyi Nicholls, Brinkman & Wu, 1998 (type)

Extinct genus of reptiles

Sikannisuchus is an extinct genus of large archosaur from upper Triassic (Norian stage) deposits of northeastern British Columbia, Canada. It is known from the holotype, TMP 94.382.3, a posterior portion of skull roof and from other fragmentary remains. It was found from four localities of the Pardonet Formation, near the community of Sikanni Chief. It was first named by Elizabeth L. Nicholls, Donald B. Brinkman, and Xiao-Chun Wu in 1998 and the type species is Sikannisuchus huskyi. It would have reached about 4 metres (13 ft) in length. Ichthyosaurs such as Macgowania, Callawayia and possibly the giant shastasaurid Shonisaurus, coelacanths Whiteia banffensis and possibly Garnbergia, and various genera of molluscs including ammonites and bivalves have also been found in the Pardonet Formation.
