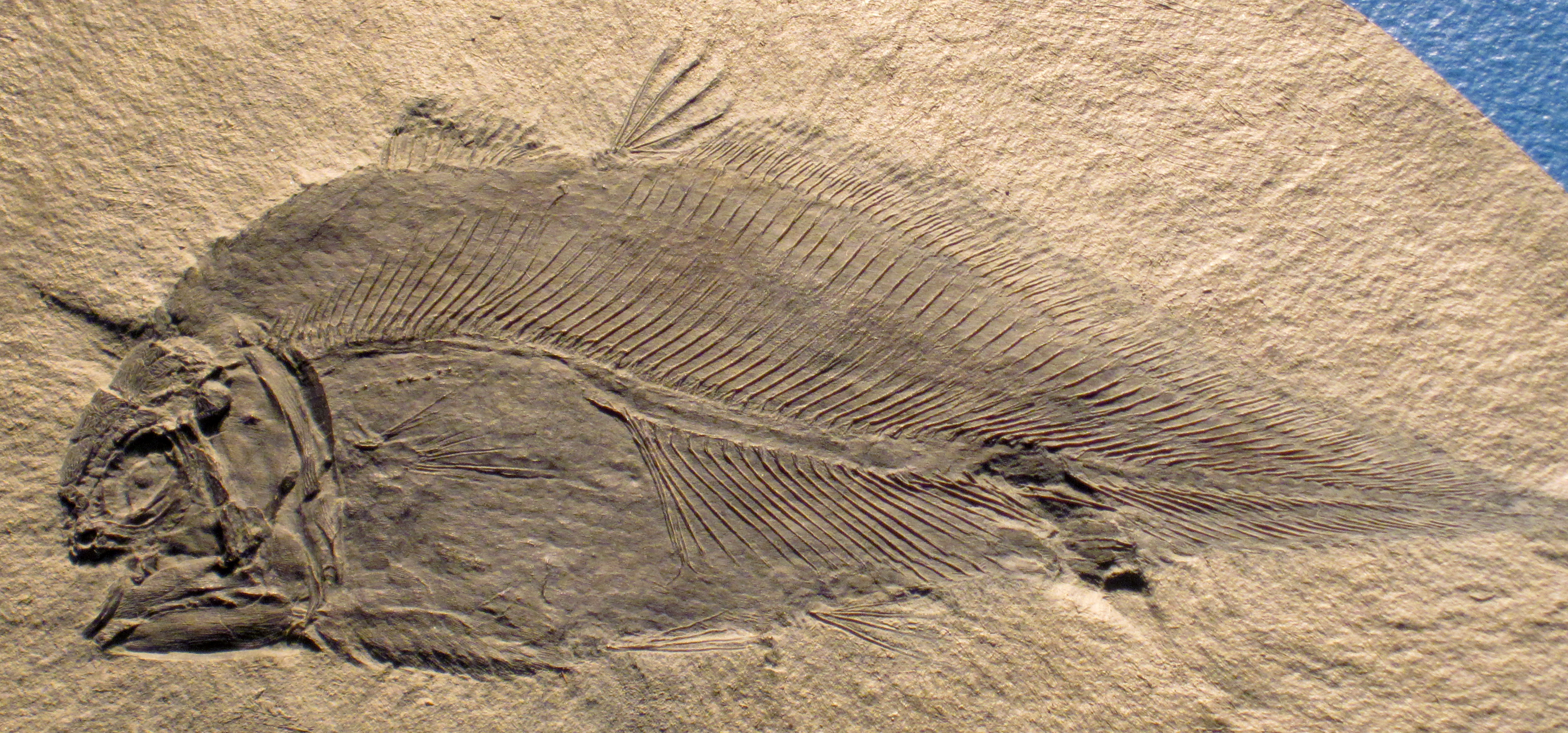
- Fossil specimen of A. montanus, Field Museum of Natural History

Scientific classification
- Kingdom: Animalia
- Phylum: Chordata
- Class: Actinistia
- Family: Hadronectoridae
- Genus: †Allenypterus; Melton, 1969
- Species: †A. montanus

Binomial name
- †Allenypterus montanus Melton, 1969

= Allenypterus =

Allenypterus Temporal range: Serpukhovian

Extinct genus of coelacanths

Allenypterus is an extinct genus of coelacanths. Fossils have been discovered in Bear Gulch Limestone, Montana, USA, which dates to the Serpukhovian stage of the late Early Carboniferous (Mississippian). Its caudal fin morphology is highly unusual among coelacanths, with the caudal (tail) fin rays being short and extending far forwards along the body which is suggested to be an adaptation to very slow undulatory movement, similar to living notopterid and gymnotid fish and that it probably lived in weedy, sheltered environments. Its small teeth and small gape suggesting that it consumed small, slow moving soft bodied prey. It lived alongside other coelacanths, including Caridosuctor, Polyosteorhynchus, Lochmocercus, and Hadronector.

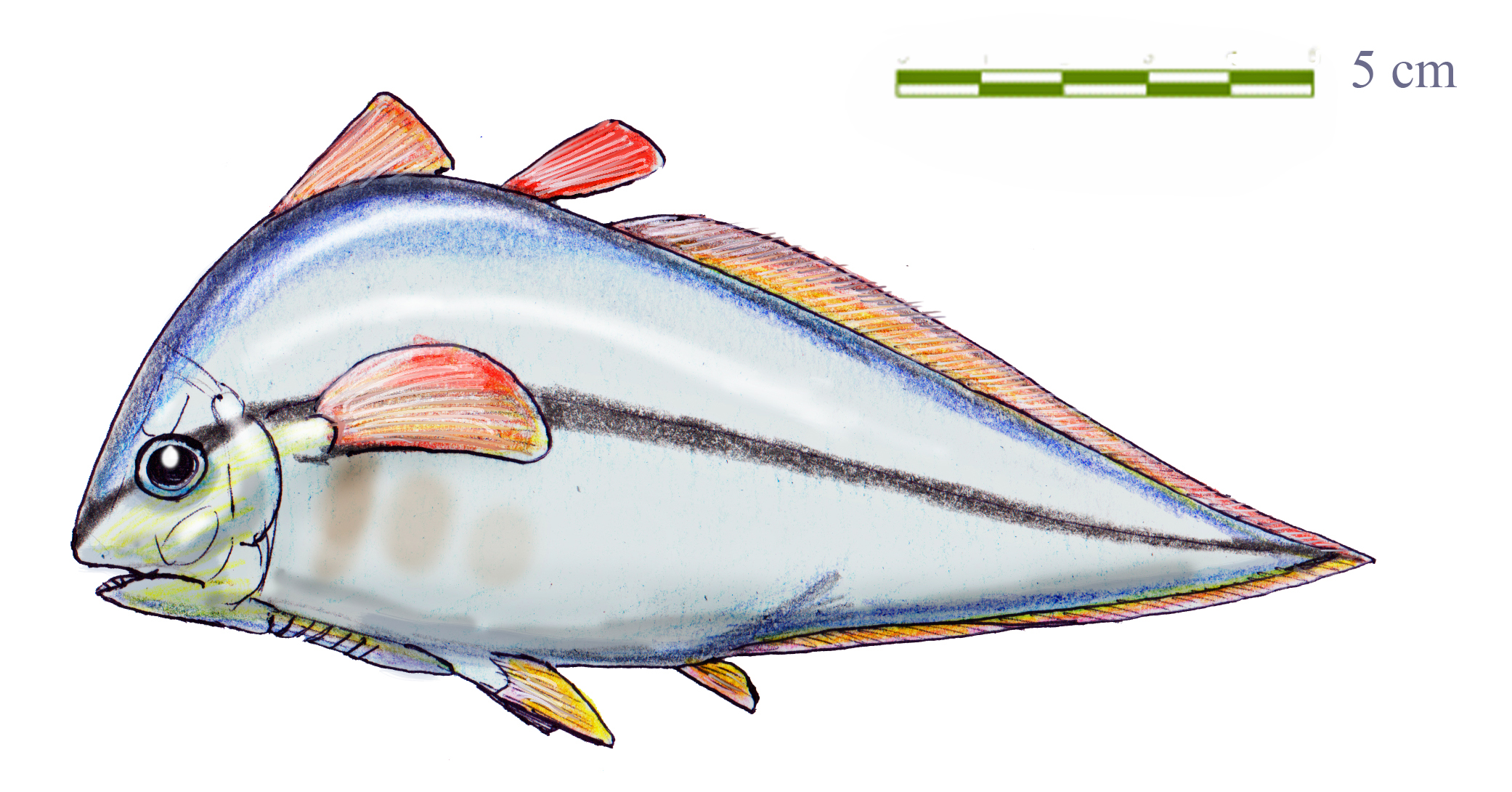
Restoration

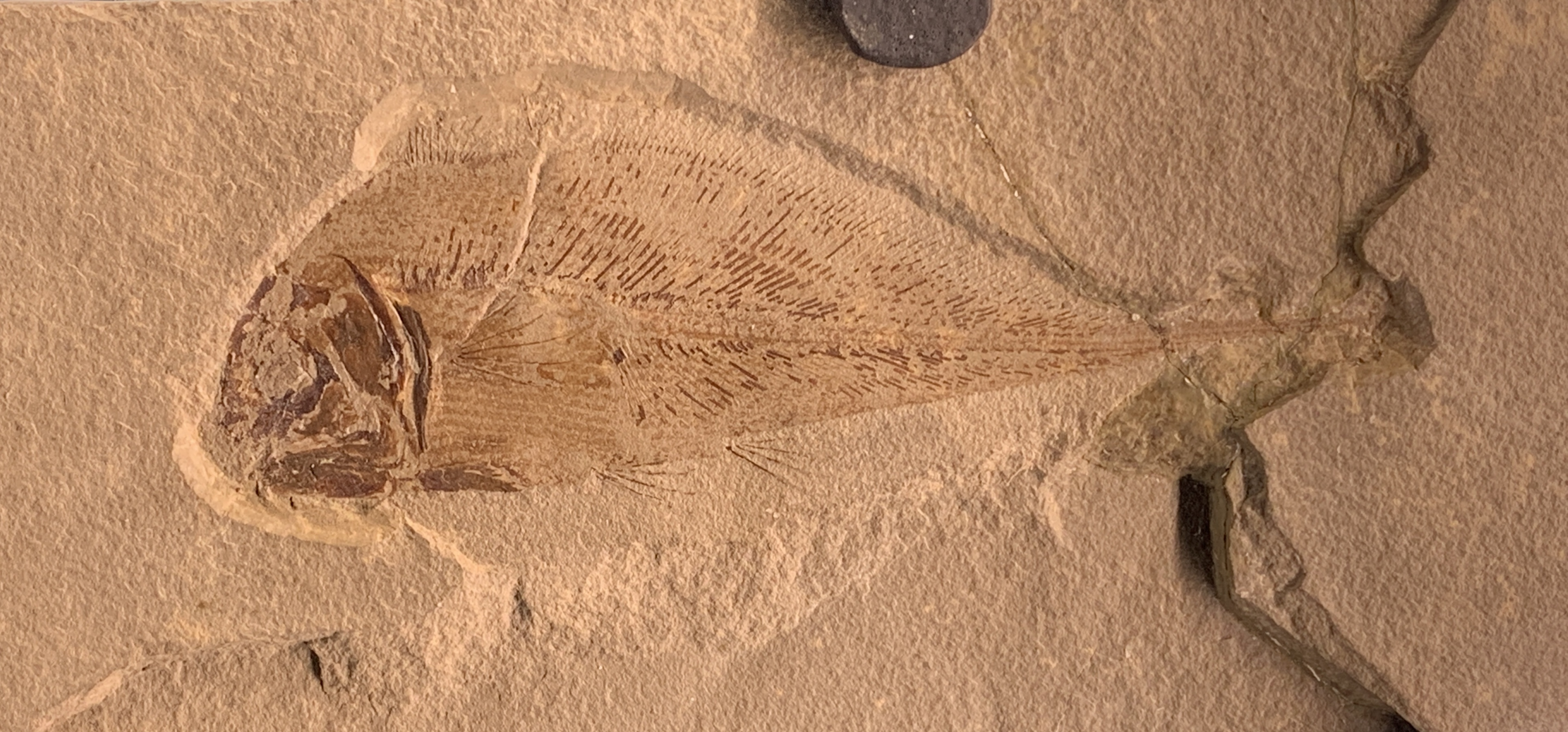
Allenypterus montanus. Heath Formation, Bear Gulch, Montana (USA). At the Royal Tyrrell Museum of Palaeontology.

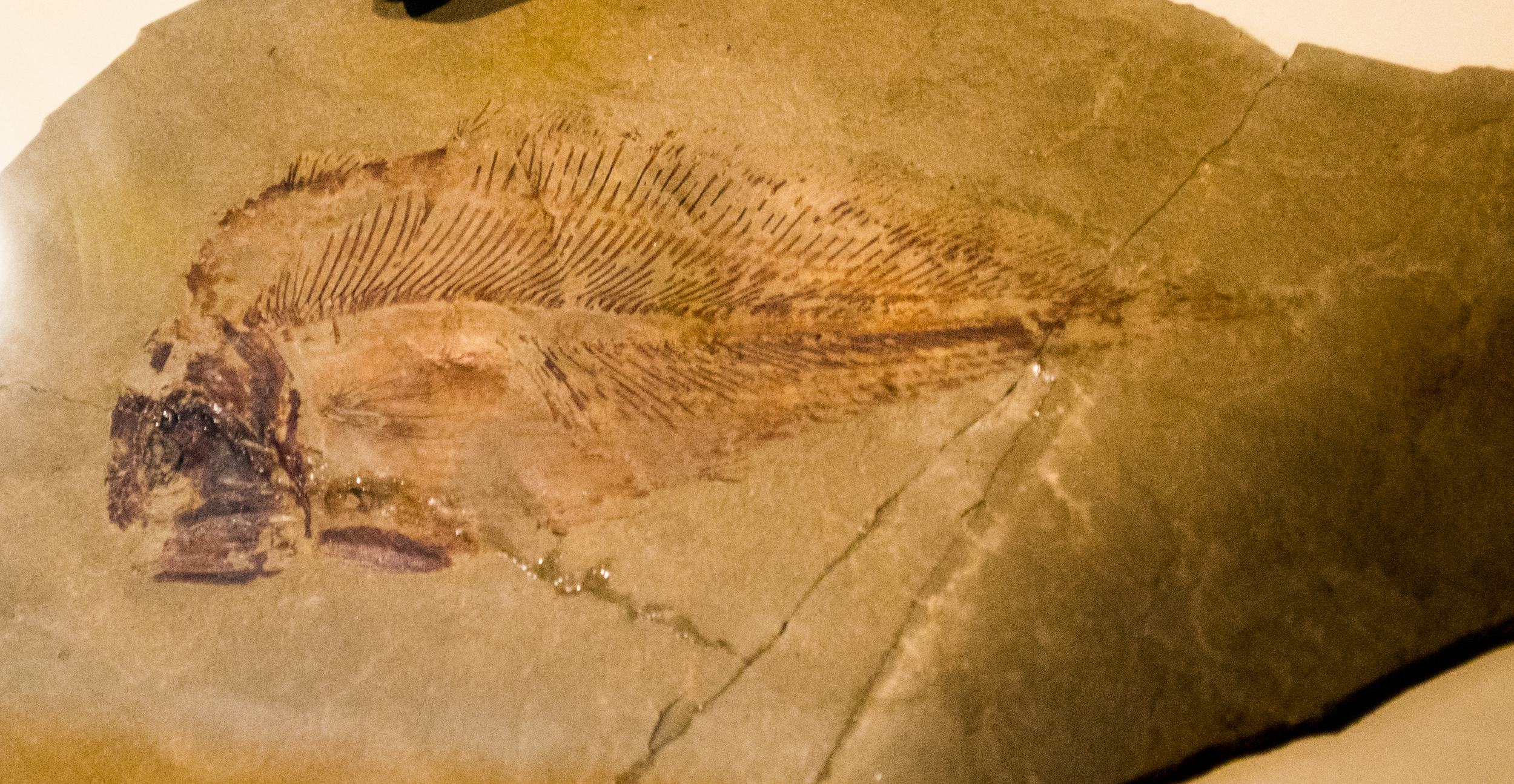
Allenypterus montanus, Museum of the Rockies

Skull diagram
