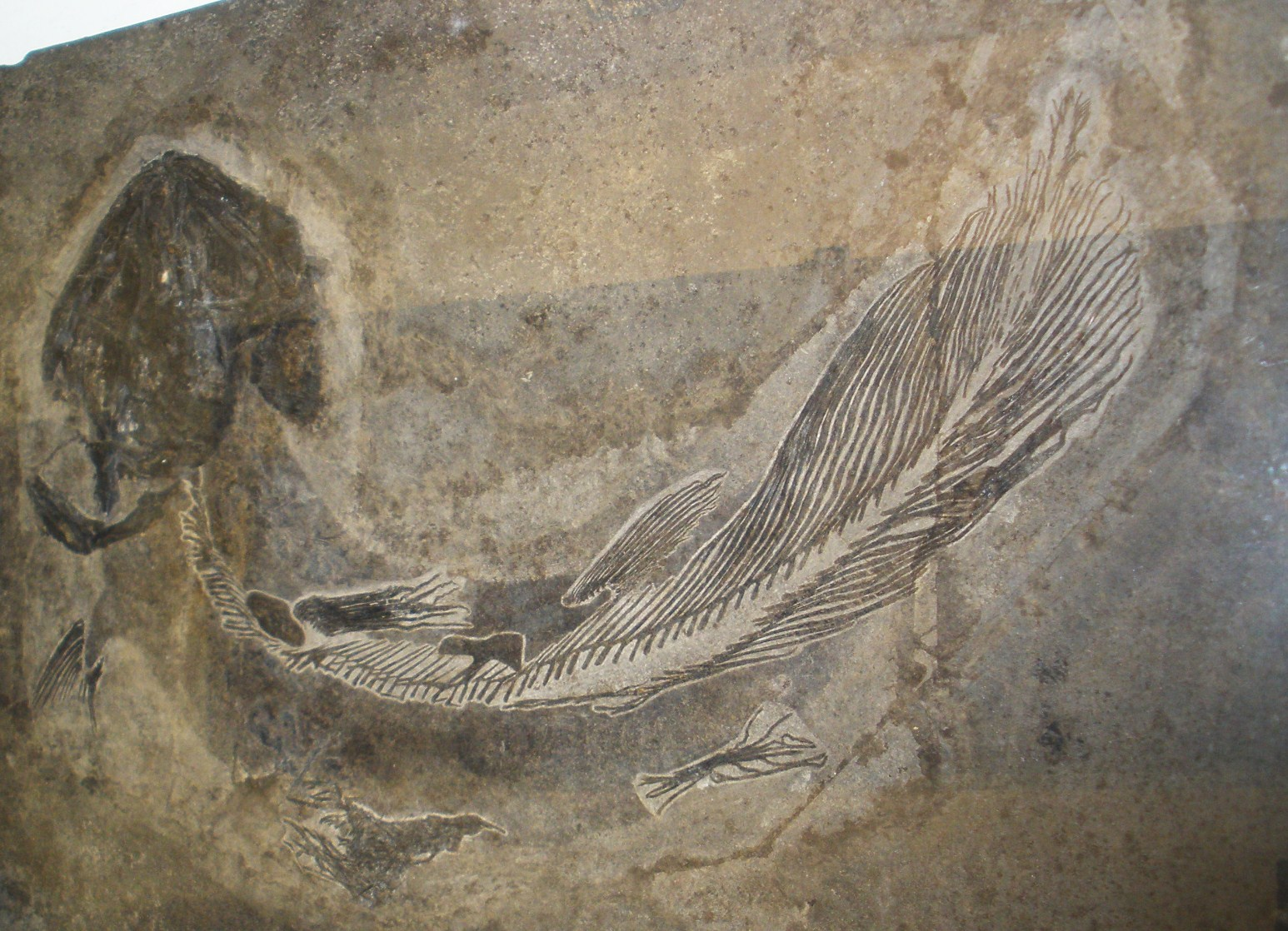
- Coelacanthus granulatus fossil
- Skull diagram of Coelacanthus granulatus

Scientific classification
- Kingdom: Animalia
- Phylum: Chordata
- Class: Actinistia
- Order: Coelacanthiformes
- Family: †Coelacanthidae
- Genus: †Coelacanthus; Agassiz, 1839
- Species: †C. granulatus

Binomial name
- †Coelacanthus granulatus Agassiz, 1839

= Coelacanthus =

Coelacanthus Temporal range: Late Permian (Wuchiapingian)

Extinct genus of coelacanths

Coelacanthus, from Ancient Greek κοῖλος (koîlos), meaning "hollow", and ἄκανθα (ákantha), meaning "spine", is a genus of extinct marine coelacanths known from the late Permian period. It was the first genus of coelacanths described, about a century before the discovery of the extant coelacanth Latimeria. The order Coelacanthiformes is named after it.

== Taxonomy ==
The only definitive species in this genus is C. granulatus from the late Permian (Wuchiapingian stage) Kupferschiefer of Germany and equivalent Marl Slate of England.

The genus has long been used to group unrelated species of coelacanths, and several other species that were first referred to Coelacanthus were later reallocated to other genera. Coelacanthus minor was considered by Woodward (1891) as potentially belonging to the Triassic genus Heptanema, while Martin and Wenz (1984) considered Coelacanthus lunzensis a possible synonym of Garnbergia. Coelacanthus madagascariensis from the Early Triassic of Madagascar was reattributed to the genus Rhabdoderma, and Coelacanthus evolutus is a synonym of Whiteia woodwardi.

The following are considered species that likely do not belong to this genus due to either lack of phylogenetic analysis or incomplete remains, but have not yet been reclassified:

- †'C.' banffensis Lambe, 1916 - Early Triassic of Alberta, Canada (sometimes considered a species of Whiteia, as W. banffensis)
- †'C.' dendrites Gardiner, 1973 - Wuchiapingian, Ecca Group of South Africa and Madumabisa Shales of Zimbabwe
- †'C.' gracilis Agassiz, 1844 - Middle Triassic of Germany
- †'C.' lunzensis Reis, 1900 - Late Triassic (Carnian) of Austria (Lunz Formation)
- †'C.' phillipsii Agassiz, 1844 - Pennsylvanian of England
- †'C.' stensioei Aldinger, 1931 - Pennsylvanian of Germany
- †'C.' welleri Eastman, 1908 - Mississippian of Iowa, USA (Kinderhook Formation)

== Description ==
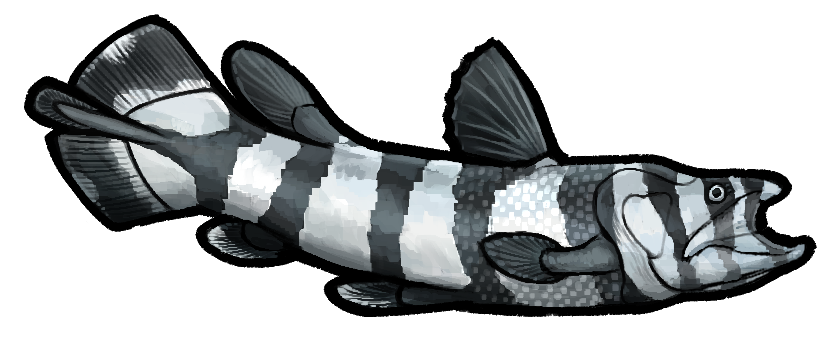
Restoration of C. granulatus

Coelacanthus bears a superficial similarity to the living coelacanth Latimeria, though it was smaller, and had a more elongated head. Individuals grew up to 0.7 metres (2.3 ft) in length, had an elongate codavypter or supplementary tail lobe, and had small lobed fins, suggesting that Coelacanthus were open-water predators. The fin rays of the caudal fin are hollow, which gave Coelacanthus its name. The name is an adaptation of the Modern Latin cœlacanthus ("hollow spine"), from the Greek κοῖλ-ος (koilos; "hollow") and ἄκανθ-α (akantha; "spine"). These hollow spines are a typical feature of coelacanths.
