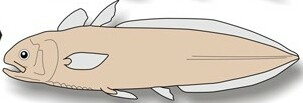
- Life restoration of H. nudus

Scientific classification
- Kingdom: Animalia
- Phylum: Chordata
- Class: Actinistia
- Family: †Diplocercididae
- Genus: †Holopterygius; Jessen, 1973
- Species: †H. nudus

Binomial name
- †Holopterygius nudus Jessen, 1973

= Holopterygius =

Holopterygius Temporal range: Givetian

Extinct genus of fishes

Holopterygius is an extinct genus of prehistoric eel-like coelacanth known from the Devonian of Europe. It contains a single species, H. nudus, known from the Middle Devonian (Givetian)-aged Oberer Plattenkalk of Germany.

Despite its specialized morphology and superficial dissimilarity to the usual Paleozoic coelacanth body plan, it is one of the most basal actinistian fish. It was initially described as an osteichthyan of uncertain affinities until it was recognized as a coelacanth in 2006, over 30 years after its initial description.

It appears to be most closely related to Allenypterus, another unusual eel-like early coelacanth, which lived much later during the Carboniferous. The taxonomic position of the clade containing both has varied due to their morphology, but a 2026 study found them to belong to a monophyletic clade of Paleozoic coelacanths, which the family Diplocercididae was redefined to encompass.

== See also ==
- Prehistoric fish
- List of prehistoric bony fish
