= Sassenia =

Sassenia Temporal range: Induan-early Olenekian
- Skull diagram of S. groenlandica

Scientific classification
- Kingdom: Animalia
- Phylum: Chordata
- Class: Actinistia
- Order: Coelacanthiformes
- Family: †Rhabdodermatidae
- Genus: †Sassenia; Stensiö, 1921

Type species
- †Sassenia tuberculata Stensiö, 1921

Other species
- †S.? guttata (Woodward, 1912); †S. groenlandica Forey, 1998

Extinct genus of coelacanths

Sassenia is an extinct genus of prehistoric coelacanth lobe-finned fish that lived during the Early Triassic epoch in what is now East Greenland and Svalbard.

The type species, Sassenia tuberculata, was first described from Sassendalen (Sassen Valley), Sabine Land, on the island of Spitsbergen, Svalbard, from where the genus name is also derived. Fossils of S. tuberculata and a possible second species, S.? guttata (described originally as Coelacanthus guttatus by Arthur Smith Woodward), were both collected from the Vikinghøgda Formation and are Smithian (early Olenekian) in age. Another species, S. groenlandica, was later discovered in Griesbachian (early Induan) aged layers of the Wordie Creek Formation in Greenland.

== See also ==
- Sarcopterygii
- List of sarcopterygians
- List of prehistoric bony fish
