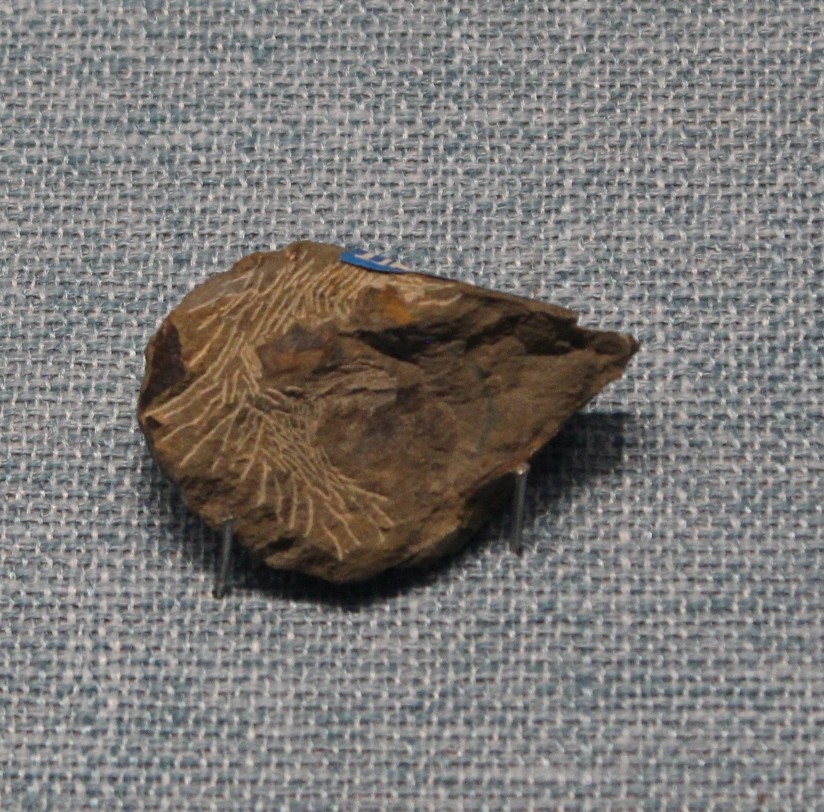
- E. yunnanensis specimen at the Baoding Natural History Museum
- Skull diagram based on two species

Scientific classification
- Kingdom: Animalia
- Phylum: Chordata
- Class: Actinistia
- Genus: †Euporosteus; Jaekel, 1927

Type species
- †Euporosteus eifeliensis Jaekel, 1927

Species
- †E. eifeliensis Jaekel, 1927; †E. yunnanensis Zhu et al., 2012

= Euporosteus =

Euporosteus Temporal range: Pragian to Givetian

Extinct genus of fishes

Euporosteus is an extinct genus of prehistoric marine coelacanth that lived during the early to middle Devonian of Europe and Asia.

It contains two known species:

- †E. eifeliensis Jaekel, 1927 (type species) - Middle Devonian (early Givetian) of Germany (Cürten Formation)
- †E. yunnanensis Zhu et al., 2012 - Early Devonian (Pragian) of Yunnan, China (Posongchong Formation)

The Asian species E. yunnanensis is one of the earliest known coelacanths, alongside the much more fragmentary Eoactinistia from Australia, and is the earliest known coelacanth to have an anatomically modern appearance. The other species, E. eifeliensis, looked similar to E. yunnanensis but lived much later in the Devonian, giving this genus a long stratigraphic range.

== See also ==
- Sarcopterygii
- List of sarcopterygians
- List of prehistoric bony fish
