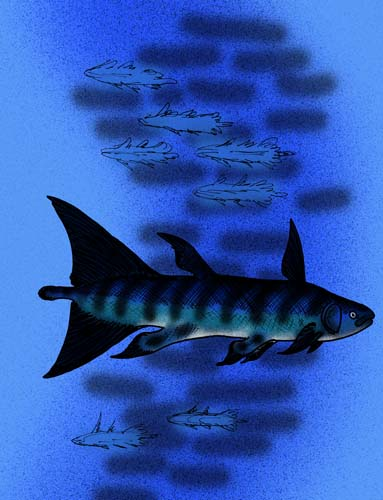
- Artist's reconstruction

Scientific classification
- Kingdom: Animalia
- Phylum: Chordata
- Class: Actinistia
- Order: Coelacanthiformes
- Family: †Rebellatricidae; Wendruff & Wilson, 2012
- Genus: †Rebellatrix; Wendruff & Wilson, 2012

Type species
- Rebellatrix divaricerca Wendruff & Wilson, 2012

= Rebellatrix =

Rebellatrix Temporal range: Early Triassic

Extinct genus of coelacanths

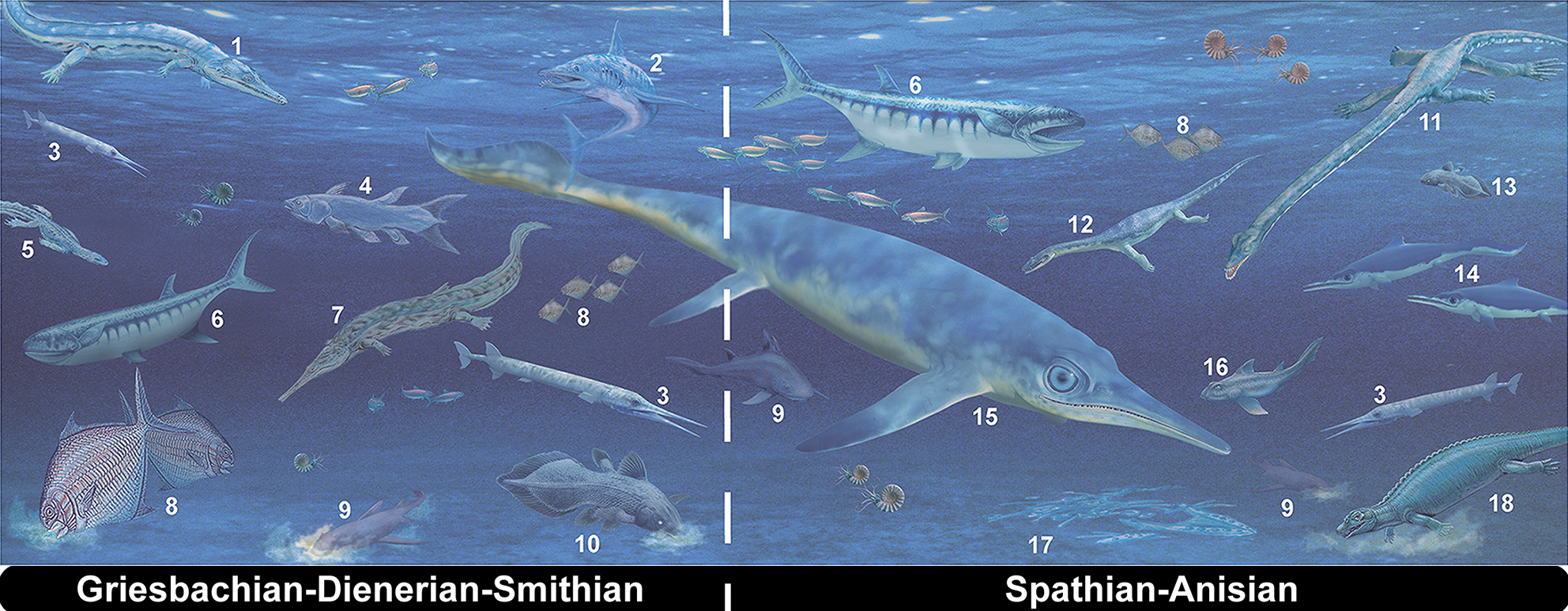
Early Triassic and Middle Triassic marine predators: 4. Rebellatrix

Rebellatrix divaricerca ("rebel coelacanth (with a) forked tail", after the unique tail fin) is a large prehistoric coelacanth from the Lower Triassic Sulphur Mountain formation and Wapiti Lake Provincial Park of British Columbia. It is the only known species of the family Rebellatricidae. R. divaricerca's most distinguishing feature was its tuna-like forked tail (unusual for an actinistian fish), which suggested a fast-swimming and active lifestyle, unlike coelacanths related to the living species.

PRPRC 2006.10.001, the holotype specimen, is a nearly complete fossil, with the exception of some fins and a large amount of the skull, as well as an incomplete tail fin. Three other specimens reveal the rest of the tail. Most specimens at the Tumbler Ridge Museum in Tumbler Ridge, with one at the Royal Tyrrell Museum of Palaeontology.

Rebellatrix may have reached 1.30 metres (4 ft 3 in) in length. In addition to its uniquely forked (and symmetrical) tail fin, the posterior dorsal fin is behind the anal fin rather than opposite it. Rebellatrix is believed to have been a fast-swimming predator perhaps somewhat similar to tuna, since its tail is clearly built for speed, and modern coelacanths only use the tail fin when attacking prey, and would have been one of the first non-sharks to fill this niche.
