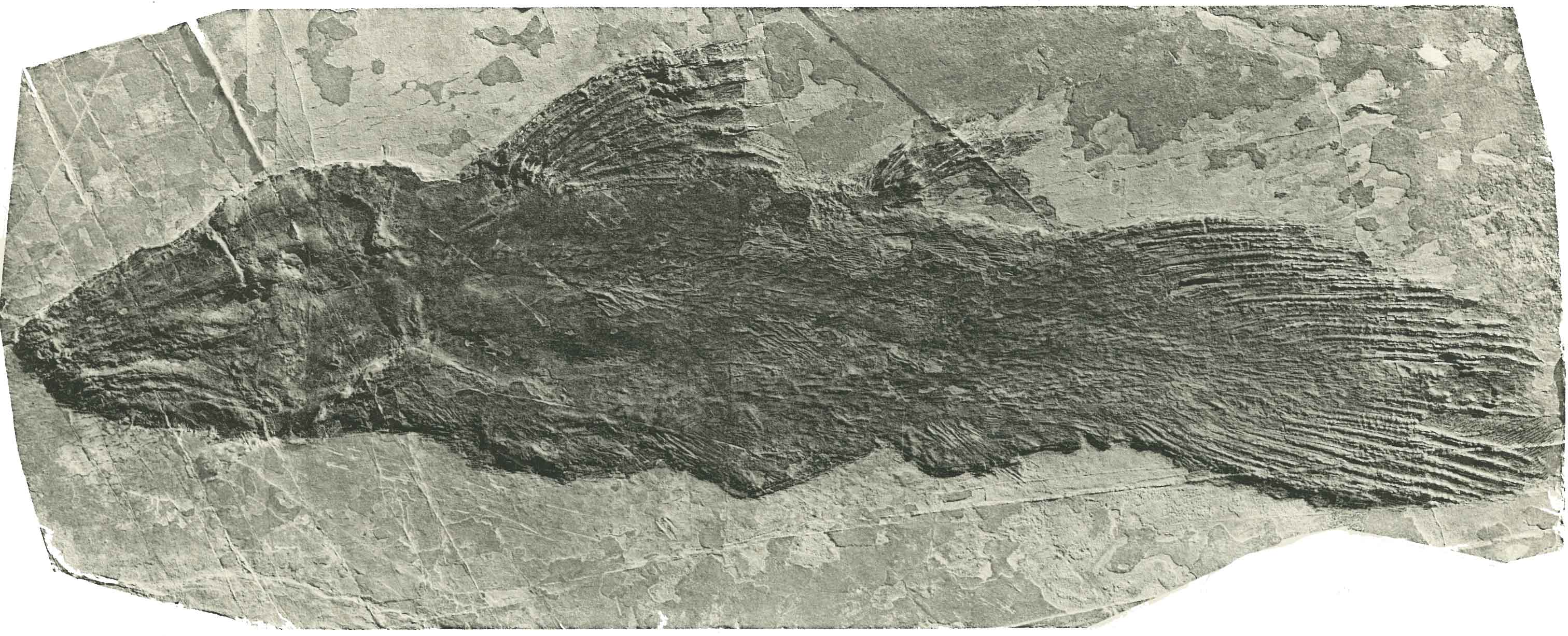
- Fossil of H. paradoxum

Scientific classification
- Kingdom: Animalia
- Phylum: Chordata
- Class: Actinistia
- Order: Coelacanthiformes
- Suborder: Latimerioidei
- Family: †Mawsoniidae
- Subfamily: †Diplurinae
- Genus: †Heptanema; Bellotti, 1857
- Species: †H. paradoxum

Binomial name
- †Heptanema paradoxum Bellotti, 1857

= Heptanema =

Heptanema Temporal range: Ladinian

Extinct genus of fishes

Heptanema is an extinct genus of prehistoric marine coelacanth from the Triassic of Europe. It contains a single species, H. paradoxa from the Middle Triassic (Ladinian)-aged deposits of Monte San Giorgio, in both northern Italy (Perledo-Varenna Formation) and southern Switzerland (Meride Formation). Its placement has been long uncertain, leading to it being excluded from many fossil phylogenies, but a 2025 study found strong evidence for it being a mawsoniid closely related to the freshwater Diplurus of North America.

Woodward (1891) suggested that "Coelacanthus" minor Agassiz, 1843, a nomen nudum based on a specimen from the Muschelkalk of France, could be a species of Heptanema. Another species, H. willemoesii from the Late Jurassic-aged Solnhofen Formation of Germany, is now placed in Macropoma.

== See also ==
- Sarcopterygii
- List of sarcopterygians
- List of prehistoric bony fish
