= Hadronector =

Hadronector Temporal range: Late Mississippian (Serpukhovian)
- Skull diagram

Scientific classification
- Kingdom: Animalia
- Phylum: Chordata
- Class: Actinistia
- Family: Hadronectoridae
- Genus: †Hadronector; Lund & Lund, 1984
- Species: †H. donbairdi

Binomial name
- †Hadronector donbairdi Lund & Lund, 1984

Extinct genus of coelacanths

Hadronector is an extinct genus of prehistoric marine coelacanth which lived during the mid-Carboniferous of North America. It contains a single species, H. donbairdi, known from well-preserved remains recovered from the Serpukhovian (about 324 million years ago)-aged Bear Gulch Limestone lagerstätte of Montana, US. It is the type genus of the family Hadronectoridae, which contains only one other known genus, the co-occurring Polyosteorhynchus.
