= Eoactinistia =

Scientific classification
- Kingdom: Animalia
- Phylum: Chordata
- Class: Actinistia
- Genus: †Eoactinistia; Johanson et al., 2006

Type species
- †Eoactinistia foreyi Johanson et al., 2006

Extinct genus of coelacanths

Eoactinistia is a prehistoric lobe-finned fish which lived during the Early Devonian period. Fossils have been found in Victoria, Australia.
