= Spermatodus =

Spermatodus Temporal range: Artinskian
- Skull diagram

Scientific classification
- Kingdom: Animalia
- Phylum: Chordata
- Class: Actinistia
- Order: Coelacanthiformes
- Family: †Rhabdodermatidae
- Genus: †Spermatodus; Cope, 1894
- Species: †S. pustulosus

Binomial name
- †Spermatodus pustulosus Cope, 1894

Extinct genus of coelacanths

Spermatodus is an extinct genus of coelacanths, which lived during the Artinskian age of the Cisuralian (early Permian) epoch in what is now Oklahoma and Texas, United States.

== See also ==
- Sarcopterygii
- List of sarcopterygians
- List of prehistoric bony fish
