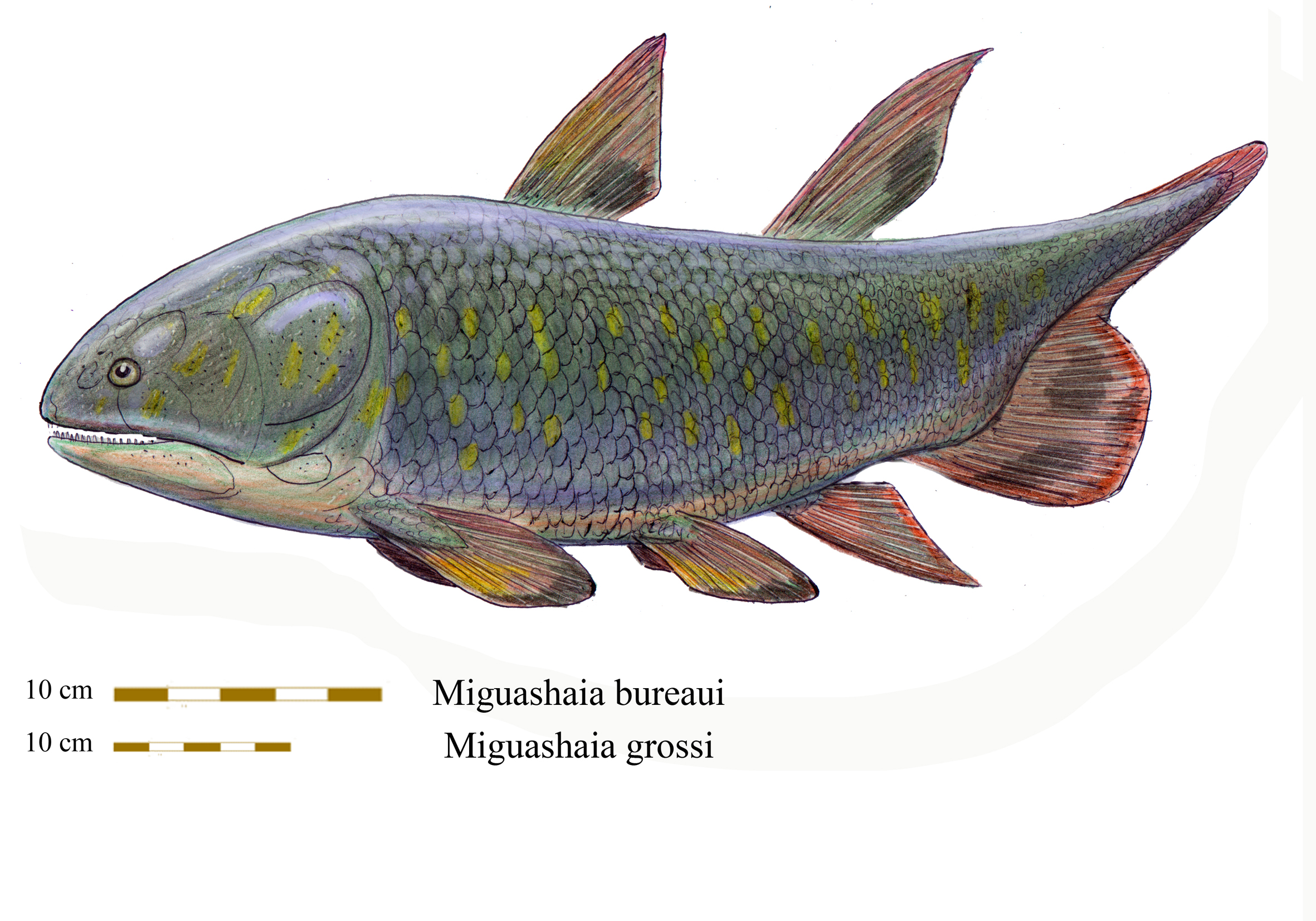
- Restoration

Scientific classification
- Kingdom: Animalia
- Phylum: Chordata
- Family: †Miguashaiidae
- Genus: †Miguashaia; Schultze, 1973

Species
- †Miguashaia bureaui Schultze, 1973; †Miguashaia grossi Forey et al. 2000

= Miguashaia =

Miguashaia Temporal range: Givetian to Frasnian, 387.7–372.2 Ma
- Skull diagram of M. bureaui

Extinct genus of fishes

Miguashaia is a genus of prehistoric lobe-finned fish which lived during the Devonian period. Miguashaia is the most primitive coelacanth fish.

== See also ==
List of prehistoric bony fish
