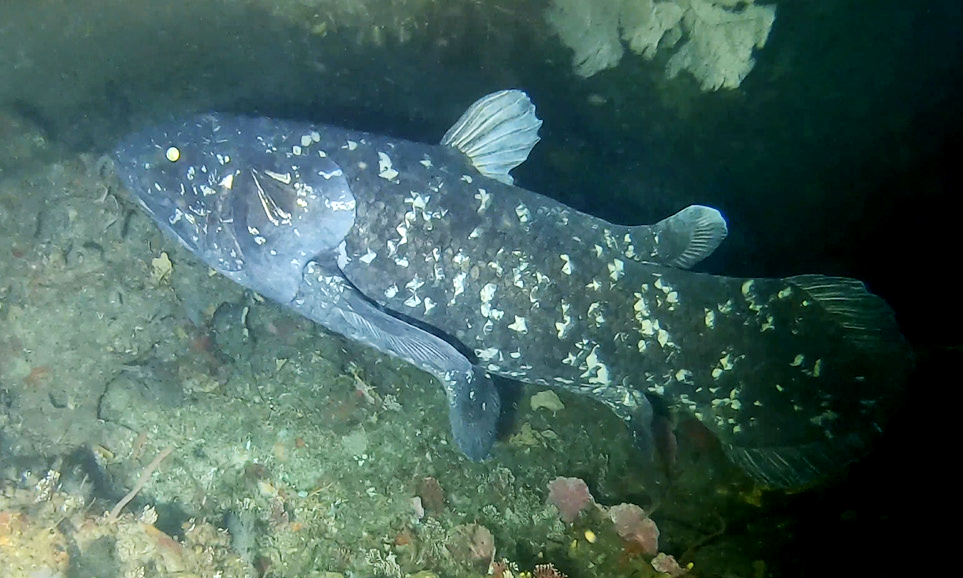
- West Indian Ocean coelacanth (Latimeria chalumnae, Latimeriidae) off Pumula on the KwaZulu-Natal South Coast, South Africa
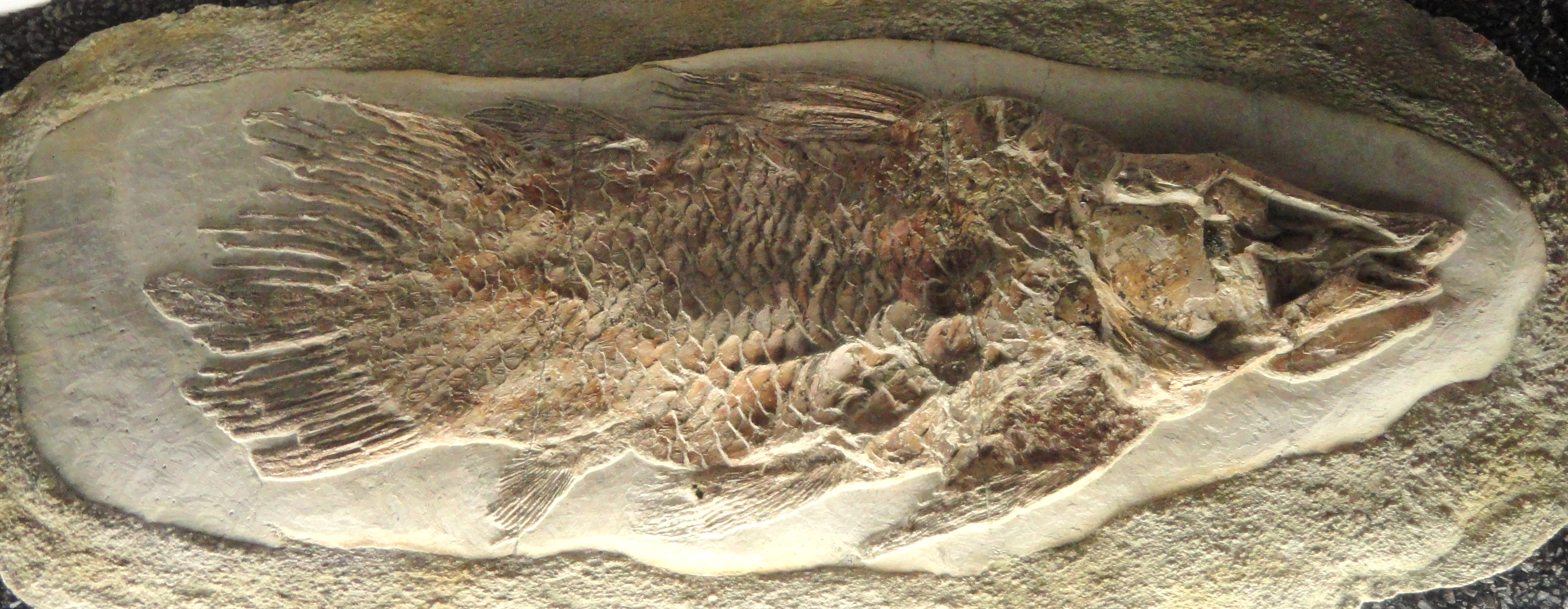
- Specimen of Axelrodichthys araripensis (Mawsoniidae) from the Early Cretaceous of Brazil

Scientific classification
- Kingdom: Animalia
- Phylum: Chordata
- Clade: Osteichthyes
- Clade: Sarcopterygii
- Class: Actinistia; Cope, 1871

Type species
- †Coelacanthus granulatus Agassiz, 1839

Families
- †Miguashaiidae; †Diplocercidae; †Hadronectoridae; †Sasseniidae; †Rhabdodermatidae; Coelacanthiformes; †Coelacanthidae; †Rebellatricidae; †Laugiidae; †Whiteiidae; †Axeliidae; Latimerioidei; Latimeriidae; †Mawsoniidae; And see text

= Coelacanth =

Coelacanths Temporal range: Early Devonian – Recent, 409–0 Ma

Class of lobe-finned fishes

Coelacanths (/ˈsiːləkænθ/ SEE-lə-kanth) are an ancient group of lobe-finned fish (Sarcopterygii) in the class Actinistia. As sarcopterygians, they are more closely related to lungfish and tetrapods (the terrestrial vertebrates including living amphibians, reptiles, birds and mammals) than to ray-finned fish. There is only a single living genus, Latimeria, with two described species.

The name coelacanth originates from the Permian genus Coelacanthus, which was the first scientifically named genus of coelacanths (in 1839), becoming the type genus of Coelacanthiformes as other species were discovered and named. Well-represented in freshwater and marine deposits from as early as the Devonian period (more than 410 million years ago), they were thought to have become extinct in the Late Cretaceous, around 66 million years ago.

The first living coelacanth species to be discovered, Latimeria chalumnae, the West Indian Ocean coelacanth, was described from specimens fished off the coast of South Africa from 1938 onward; they are now also known to inhabit the seas around the Comoro Islands off the east coast of Africa. The Indonesian coelacanth Latimeria menadoensis was discovered in the late 1990s, and inhabits the seas of Eastern Indonesia, from the northern region of Central Sulawesi and eastwards to Papua. Genetic studies suggests that the Indonesian population may in fact encompass more than one distinct species.

The two species within the extant genus Latimeria are often considered examples of "living fossils" in popular science because they were considered the sole remaining members of a taxon otherwise known only from fossils (a biological relict), and that they had retained the same bodyplan that had evolved approximately 400 million years ago. However, fossil coelacanths have shown body shapes and niches that were much more diverse than what was previously thought, and often differed significantly from Latimeria; some species seemed to have been active, pelagic swimmers like Rebellatrix. The family Mawsoniidae has species which moved between freshwater and saltwater.

== Etymology ==
The word Coelacanth is an adaptation of the Modern Latin Cœlacanthus ('hollow spine'), from the Ancient Greek κοῖλ-ος (koilos, 'hollow') and ἄκανθ-α (akantha, 'spine'), referring to the hollow caudal fin rays of the first fossil specimen described and named by Louis Agassiz in 1839, belonging to the genus Coelacanthus. The genus name Latimeria commemorates Marjorie Courtenay-Latimer, who discovered the first specimen.

== Discovery ==
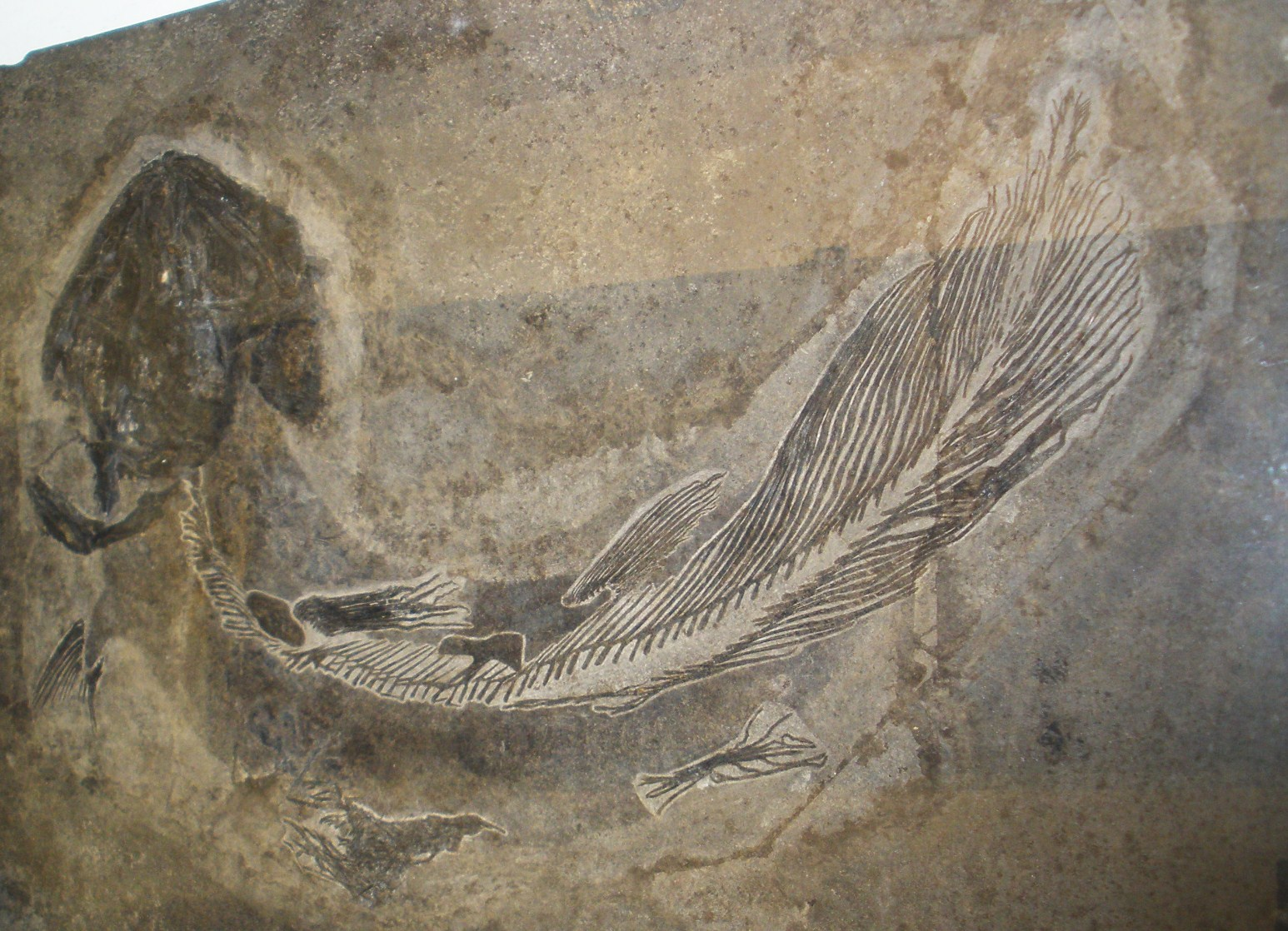
Fossil of Coelacanthus granulatus, the first described coelacanth, named by Louis Agassiz in 1839

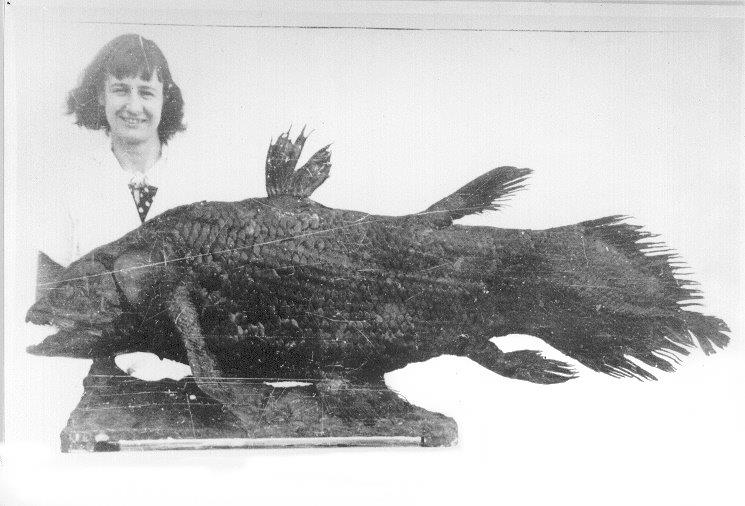
Marjorie Courtenay-Latimer with the type specimen of Latimeria chalumnae

The earliest fossils of coelacanths were discovered in the 19th century. Coelacanths were believed to have become extinct at the end of the Cretaceous period. More closely related to tetrapods than to the ray-finned fish, coelacanths were considered a transitional form between fish and tetrapods.

On 22 December 1938, the first Latimeria specimen was found off the east coast of South Africa, off the Chalumna River (now Tyolomnqa). Museum curator Marjorie Courtenay-Latimer discovered the fish among the catch of a local fisherman. Courtenay-Latimer contacted a Rhodes University ichthyologist, J. L. B. Smith, sending him drawings of the fish, and he confirmed the fish's importance with a famous cable: "Most Important Preserve Skeleton and Gills = Fish Described." Its discovery over 60 million years after its supposed extinction makes the coelacanth the best-known example of a Lazarus taxon, a taxon or an evolutionary line that seems to have disappeared from the fossil record only to reappear much later. Since 1938, West Indian Ocean coelacanth have been found in the Comoros, Kenya, Tanzania, Mozambique, Madagascar, in iSimangaliso Wetland Park, and off the South Coast of KwaZulu-Natal in South Africa.

The Comoro Islands specimen was discovered in December 1952. Between 1938 and 1975, 84 specimens were caught and recorded.

The second extant species, the Indonesian coelacanth, was first recognized in Manado, North Sulawesi, Indonesia, by Mark V. Erdmann and his wife Arnaz Mehta at a local fish market in September 1997, but were only able to take a few photographs of the first specimen of this species before it was sold. After confirming that it was a unique discovery, Erdmann returned to Sulawesi in November 1997 to interview fishermen and look for further examples. A second specimen was caught by a fisherman in July 1998 and was then handed to Erdmann. The species was described in 1999 by Pouyaud et al. based on Erdmann's 1998 specimen and deposited at a facility of the Indonesian Institute of Sciences (LIPI).

=== Distribution ===
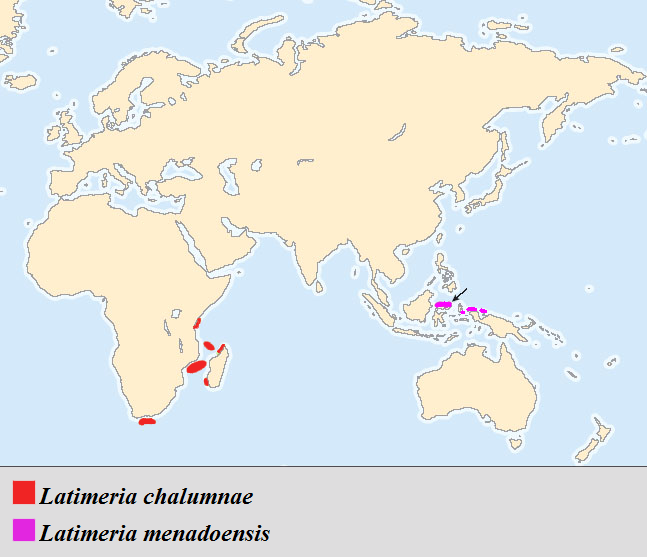
Geographical distribution of living coelacanths

During the Paleozoic and Mesozoic, coelacanths had a global distribution, with remains having been found on every continent except Antarctica. The two extant Latimeria species, the West Indian Ocean coelacanth and the Indonesian coelacanth, are restricted to the southern and eastern coasts of Africa and northern Indonesia, respectively.

== Description ==
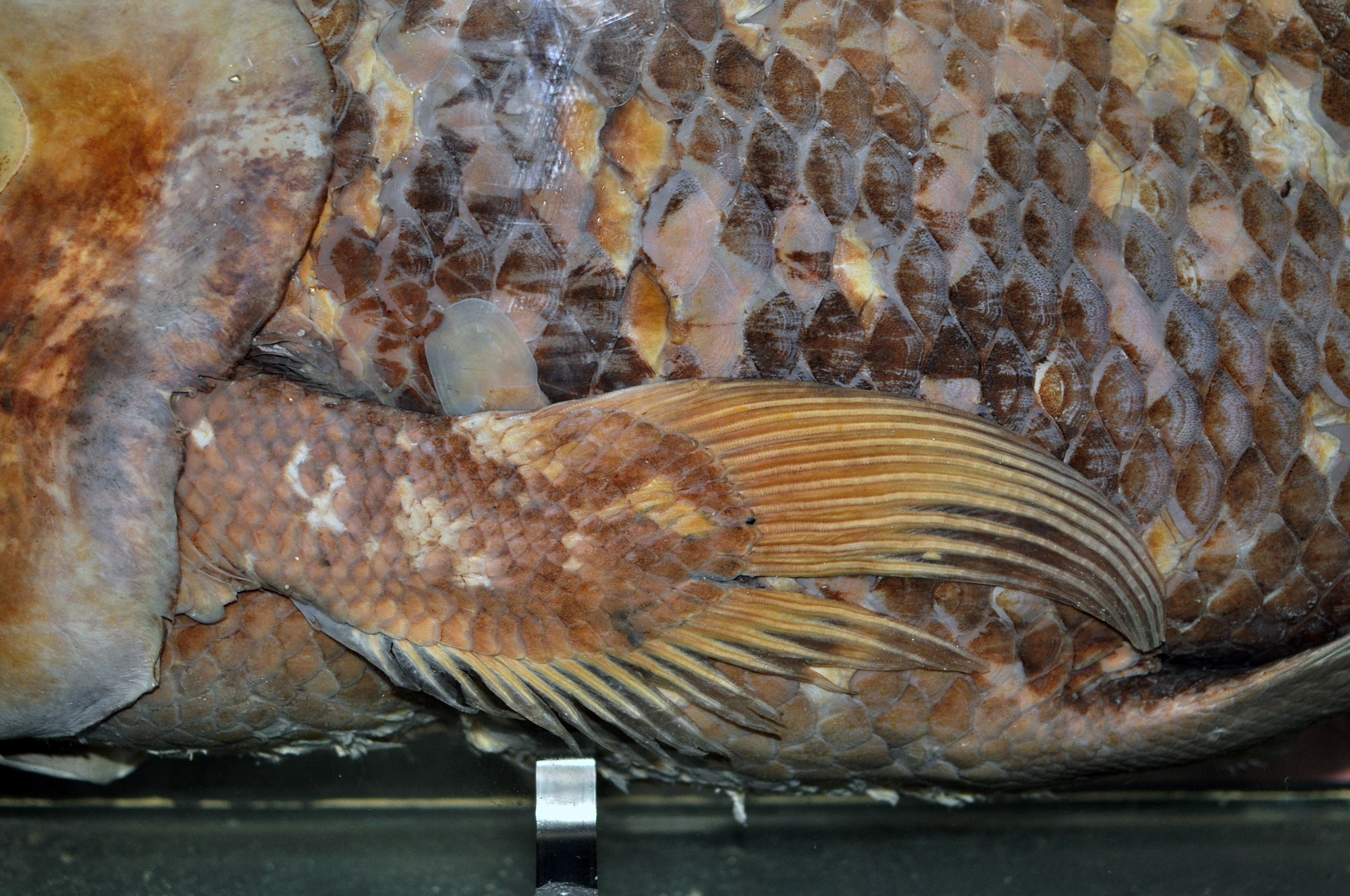
Pectoral fin of a West Indian Ocean coelacanth

Coelacanths are a part of Sarcopterygii or the lobe-finned fishes, the same clade as the lungfish and tetrapods, and they all possess lobed fins as opposed to rayed fins. Externally, several characteristics distinguish coelacanths from other lobe-finned fish: coelacanths have eight fins – two dorsal fins, two pectoral fins, two pelvic fins, one anal fin and one caudal fin. The tail is very nearly equally proportioned and is split by a terminal tuft of fin rays that make up its caudal lobe; this is alternatively termed a trilobate fin (three-lobed) or a diphycercal tail. A secondary tail extending past the primary tail separates the upper and lower halves of the coelacanth. The pectoral fins of coelacanths are lobed and relatively elongate.

A number of characters unite all coelacanths, these include the pronounced development of an intracranial joint in the skull (which may serve to enhance bite force), the presence of a rostral organ (an organ unique to coelacanths which serves for electroreception) at the front of the head, a pair of external nostrils, a single bone named the lachrymojugal beneath the eyes, the jaw suspension is upright, with the palate on the underside of the skull being triangular in shape. There are two separate jointed points of articulation between each half of the skull and lower jaws, with the joints being between the quadrate on the skull and articular on the lower jaw and likewise between the symplectic and retroarticular. The dentary bone on the lower jaw is short, and is curved in members of Latimerioidei including living coelacanths. The angular bone on the lower jaw is large. The maxilla, the main tooth-bearing upper jaw bone in other fish and tetrapods, has been lost in all coelacanths along with the submandibulars (part of the lower jaw) and branchiostegals (part of the operculum which covers the gills), with some coelacanths, including living Latimeria coelacanths, also showing the loss of the jugal. The shoulder girdle is loose from the skull and has an extracleithrum. The front dorsal fin lacks radial bones and is generally sail-like in shape. The anal fin and the posterior dorsal fin are essentially identical and similar in morphology to the paired fins. The scales of coelacanths are generally circular and overlapping, and lack ganoine or cosmine. These scales are either ornamented with denticles, tubercles or ridges capped with enamel.

Coelacanths also retain an oil-filled notochord, a hollow, pressurized tube which is replaced by a vertebral column early in embryonic development in most other vertebrates. Most fossil coelacanths have a lung surrounded by a heavily calcified casing. In living Latimeria coelacanths, the lung is present but is only surrounded by small scattered calcified plates, and is small and appears to be vestigial, rather than large and likely functional as in fossil coelacanths, likely allowing for air breathing, as is thought to be ancestral for bony fish, as well as hearing.

== Evolution and taxonomy ==
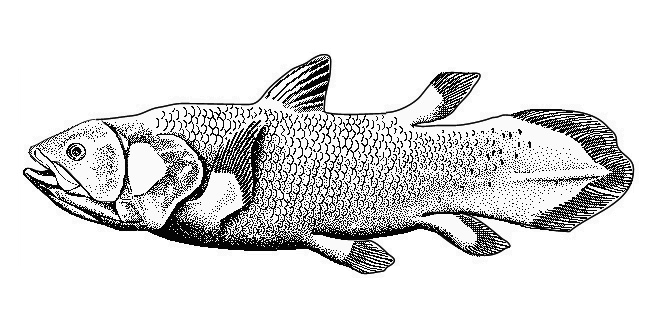
West Indian Ocean coelacanth Latimeria chalumnae (Latimeriidae)

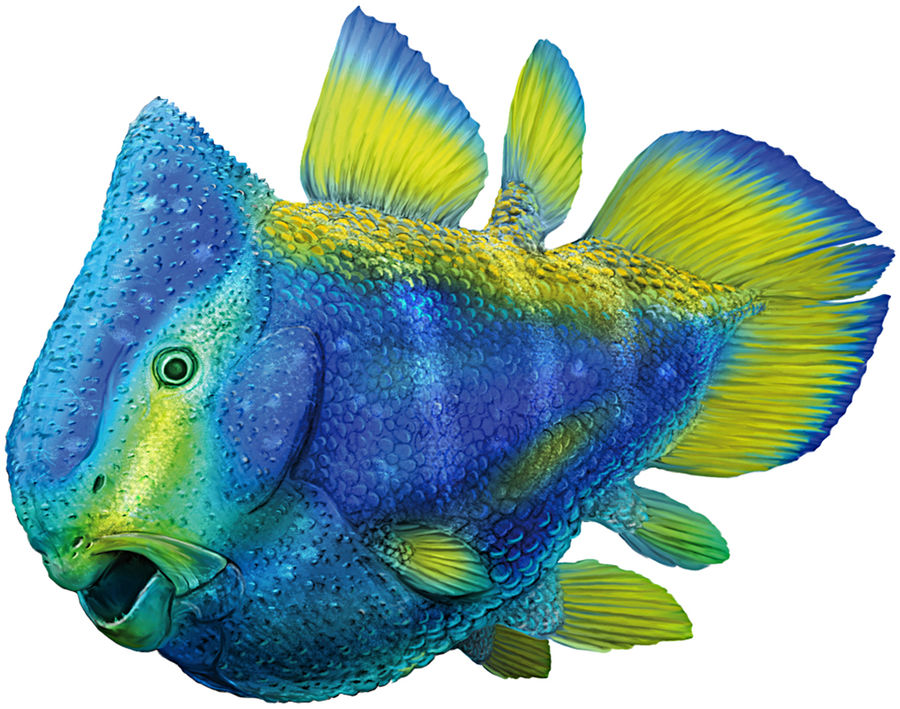
Foreyia maxkuhni (Latimeriidae)

Mawsonia gigas (Mawsoniidae)

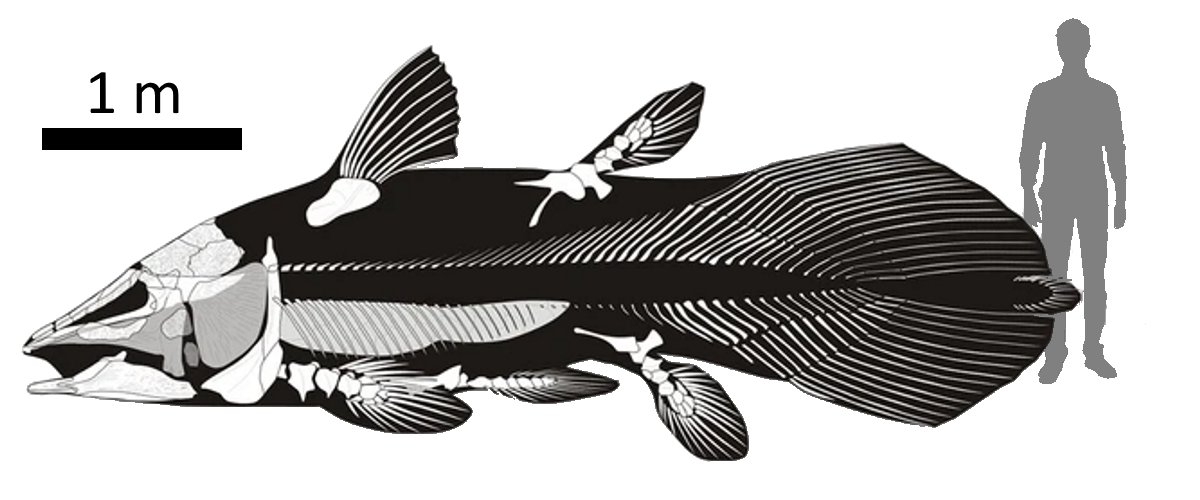
Estimated size of the largest known individual of the Jurassic-Cretaceous freshwater coelacanth Mawsonia compared to a human

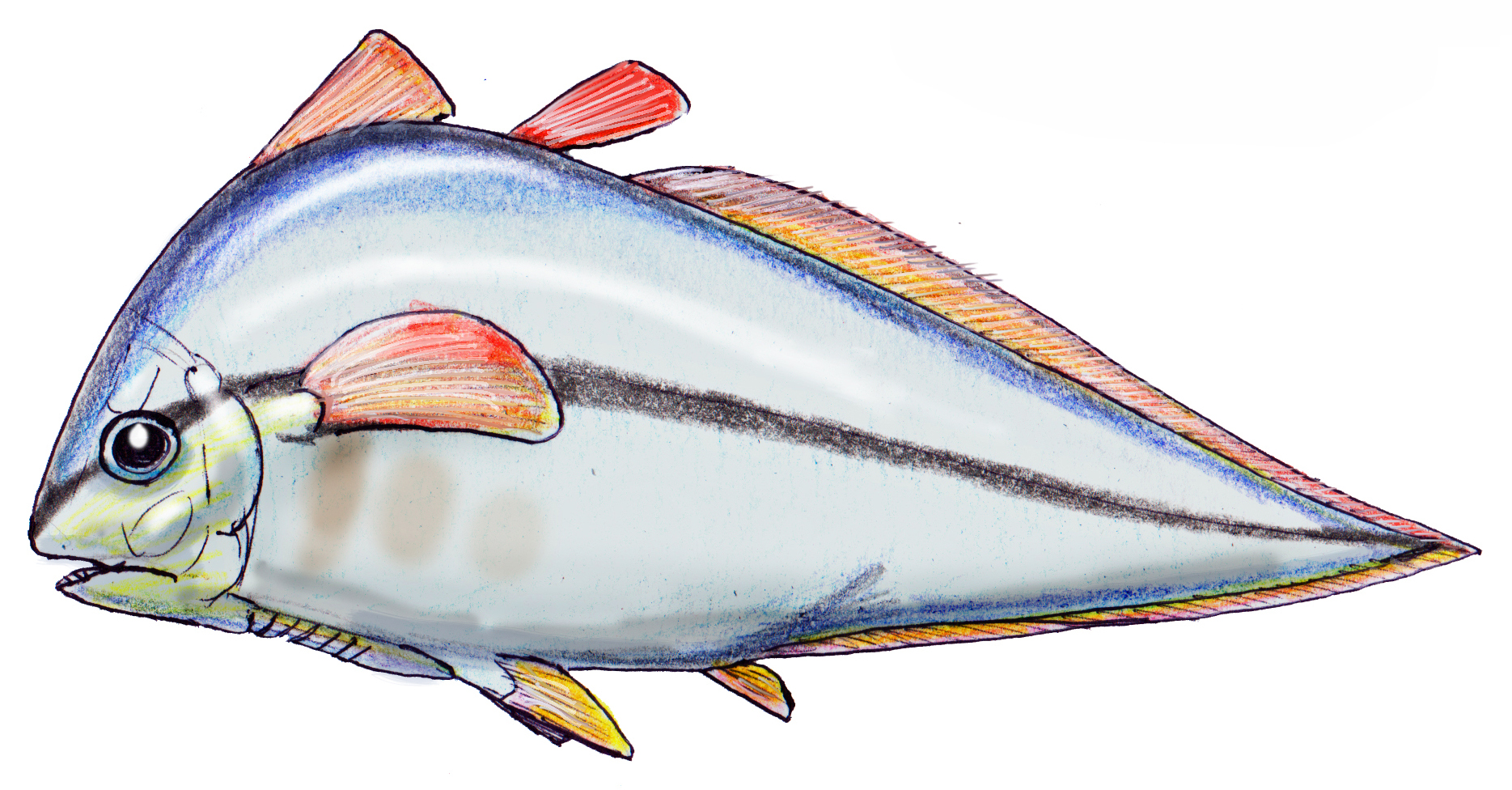
Allenypterus montanus (Hadronectoridae)

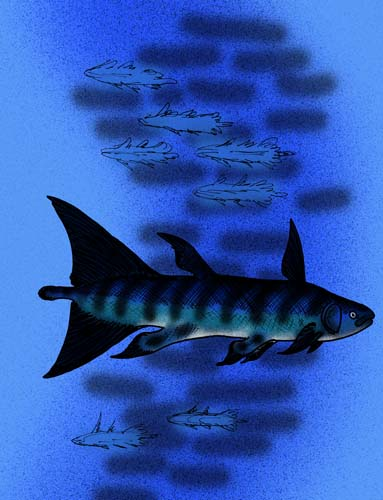
Rebellatrix (Rebellatricidae)

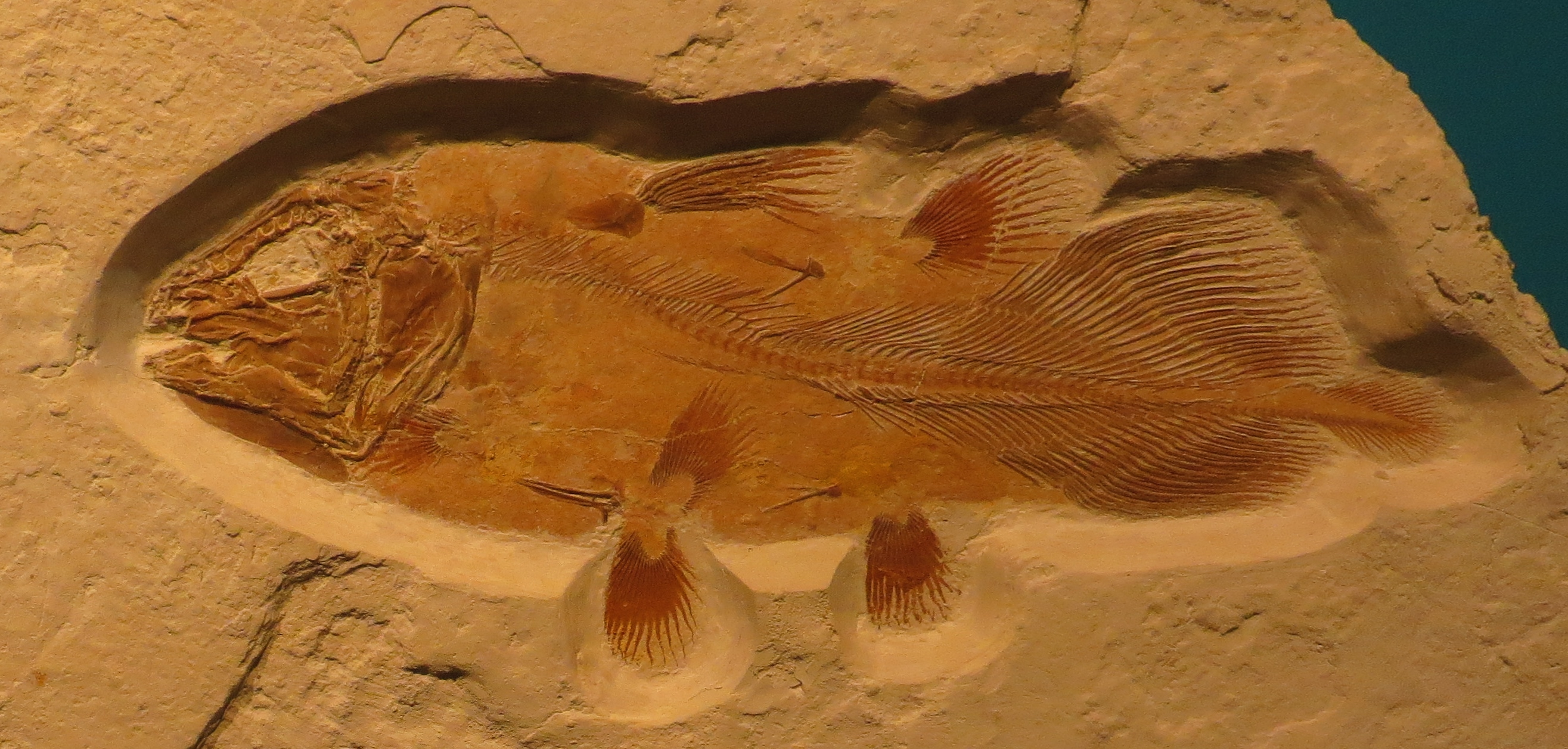
Libys (Latimeriidae) from the Upper Jurassic of Germany

Coelacanths are members of the class Actinistia, with many researchers considering the term "coelacanth" to cover all members of Actinistia. The order Coelacanthiformes has been used for a subgroup of actinistians, containing the modern coelacanths, as well as other extinct closely related actinistians spanning from the Permian onwards. Based on the fossil record, the divergence of coelacanths, lungfish, and tetrapods is thought to have occurred during the Silurian. Over 100 fossil species of coelacanth have been described. The oldest identified coelacanth fossils are around 420–410 million years old, dating to the Pragian stage of the early Devonian. These include Eoactinistia from Australia, known only from a fragmentary jaw, as well as Euporosteus yunnanensis from China, known from a partial skull that indicates it to be the earliest anatomically modern coelacanth. Some authors have also suggested that the slightly older onychodont Styloichthys may also be an early coelacanth.

Coelacanths were never a diverse group in comparison to other groups of fish, and reached a peak diversity during the Early Triassic (252–247 million years ago), coinciding with a burst of diversification between the Late Permian and Middle Triassic. Most Mesozoic coelacanths belong to the suborder Latimerioidei, which contains two major subdivisions, the marine Latimeriidae, which contains modern coelacanths, as well as the extinct Mawsoniidae, which were native to brackish, freshwater as well as marine environments.

Paleozoic coelacanths are generally small (~30–40 cm or 12–16 in in length), while Mesozoic forms were larger. Several specimens belonging to the Jurassic and Cretaceous mawsoniid coelacanth genera Trachymetopon and Mawsonia likely reached or exceeded 5 metres (16 feet) in length, making them amongst the largest known fishes of the Mesozoic, and amongst the largest bony fishes of all time.

The most recent fossil latimeriid is Megalocoelacanthus dobiei, whose disarticulated remains are found in late Santonian to middle Campanian, and possibly earliest Maastrichtian-aged marine strata of the Eastern and Central United States, the most recent mawsoniids are Axelrodichthys megadromos from early Campanian to early Maastrichtian freshwater continental deposits of France, as well as an indeterminate marine mawsoniid from Morocco, dating to the late Maastrichtian A small bone fragment from the European Paleocene has been considered the only plausible post-Cretaceous record, but this identification is based on comparative bone histology methods of doubtful reliability.

Living coelacanths have been considered "living fossils" based on their supposedly conservative morphology relative to fossil species; however, recent studies have expressed the view that coelacanth morphologic conservatism is a belief not based on data. Fossils suggest that coelacanths were most morphologically diverse during the Devonian and Carboniferous, while Mesozoic species are generally morphologically similar to each other.

Cladogram showing the relationships of coelacanth genera after Torino, Soto and Perea, 2021.

- - †Mimipiscis (Actinopterygii)
  - †Porolepis (†Porolepiformes)
  - Actinistia
    - †Miguashaia
    - †Styloichthys
    - †Gavinia
    - - †Diplocercides
      - - †Serenichthys
        - - †Holopterygius
          - †Allenypterus
        - - †Lochmocercus
          - - - †Polyosteorhynchus
              - - †Rebellatrix
                - †Hadronector
            - - †Rhabdoderma
              - - †Caridosuctor
                - - - †Sassenia
                    - †Spermatodus
                  - - - †Piveteauia
                      - - †Coccoderma
                        - †Laugia
                    - - †Coelacanthus
                      - - †Guizhoucoelacanthus
                        - - - †Wimania
                            - †Axelia
                          - - †Whiteia
                            - - †Heptanema
                              - †Dobrogeria
                              - Latimerioidei
                                - †Mawsoniidae
                                  - - †Atacamaia
                                    - †Luopingcoelacanthus
                                  - - †Yunnancoelacanthus
                                    - - †Chinlea
                                      - - †Parnaibaia
                                        - - †Trachymetopon
                                          - †Lualabaea
                                          - - †Axelrodichthys
                                            - †Mawsonia
                                - Latimeriidae
                                  - †Garnbergia
                                  - - †Diplurus
                                    - - - †Megalocoelacanthus
                                        - †Libys
                                      - - - †Ticinepomis
                                          - †Foreyia
                                        - - †Holophagus
                                          - - †Undina
                                            - - †Macropoma
                                              - - †Swenzia
                                                - Latimeria

After Ferrante and Cavin (2025):

- Actinistia
  - †Miguashaiidae
    - †Gavinia
    - †Miguashaia
  - - †Diplocercidae
      - - †Ngamugawi
        - - †Diplocercides
          - †Euporosteus
      - - - †Allenypterus
          - †Holopterygius
        - - †Lochmocercus
          - †Serenichthys
    - - †Hadronectoridae
        - †Hadronector
        - †Polyosteorhynchus
      - - †Sassenia
        - - †Rhabdodermatidae
            - †Spermatodus
            - - †Caridosuctor
              - †Rhabdoderma
          - Coelacanthiformes
            - †Coelacanthus
            - - †Rebellatrix
              - - †Laugiidae
                  - †Piveteauia
                  - - †Coccoderma
                    - †Laugia
                - - †Whiteiidae
                    - †Whiteia
                    - - †Garnbergia
                      - †Guizhoucoelacanthus
                  - - †Axeliidae
                      - †Atacamaia
                      - - †Axelia
                        - †Wimania
                    - Latimerioidei
                      - †Mawsoniidae
                        - †Indocoelacanthus
                        - - †Diplurinae
                            - †Heptanema
                            - - †Diplurus
                              - †Reidus
                          - †Mawsoniinae
                            - †Chinlea
                            - - †Parnaibaia
                              - - †Axelrodichthys
                                - - †Mawsonia
                                  - - †Lualabaea
                                    - †Trachymetopon
                      - Latimeriidae
                        - †Dobrogeria
                        - - †Ticinepomiinae
                            - †Ticinepomis
                            - - †Foreyia
                              - †Rieppelia
                          - Latimeriinae
                            - †Undina
                            - - †Holophagus
                              - - - Latimeria
                                  - †Swenzia
                                - - †Macropoma
                                  - - †Libys
                                    - †Megalocoelacanthus

=== Timeline of genera ===
After Ferrante and Cavin (2025):

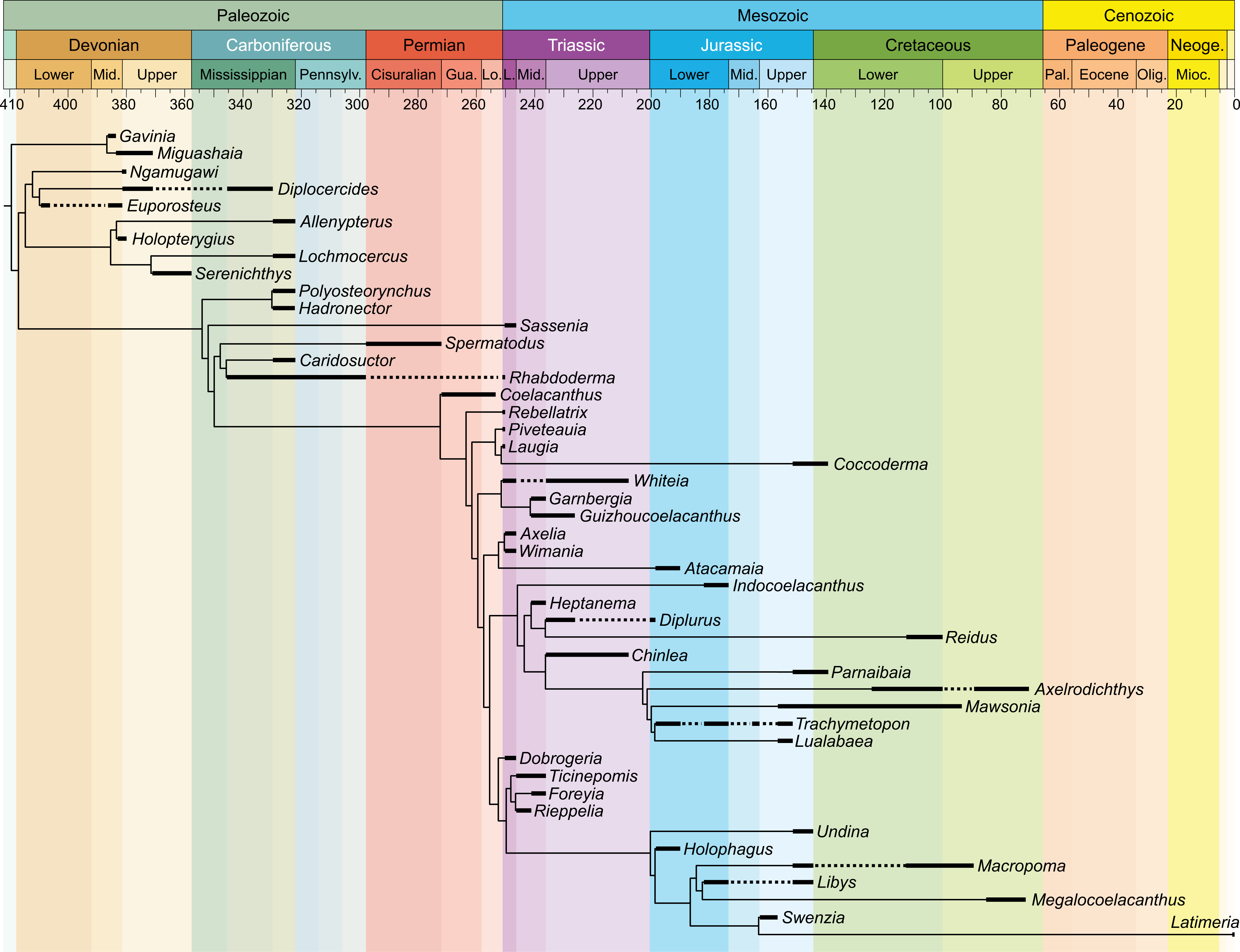

== Biology ==
Living Latimeria coelacanths are nocturnal piscivorous drift-hunters, often drifting in a state of near motionlessness. Species of Latimeria are opportunistic feeders, hunting cuttlefish, squid, snipe eels, small sharks, and other fish found in their deep reef and volcanic slope habitats. Latimeria are also known to swim head down, backwards or belly up to locate their prey. To move around, they most commonly take advantage of up- or down-wellings of current and drift. Their paired fins stabilize movement through the water. While on the ocean floor, they do not use the paired fins for any kind of movement. Latimeria generate thrust with their caudal fins for quick starts. Due to the abundance of its fins, Latimeria has high maneuverability and can orient its body in almost any direction in the water. Latimeria have been seen doing headstands as well as swimming belly up. It is thought that the rostral organ helps give Latimeria electroreception. The electroreceptive rostral organ of living coelacanths is suggested to be primarily used to detect the position of the prey when it is within the vicinity of the mouth just prior to the final strike, rather than for long distance prey detection. Thrust is primarily generated by the fins. The paired fins are very mobile and can be moved in ways unusual among fish fins in order to accomplish precise movements, such as a figure of eight pattern.

The generally rounded, broad tail (caudal) fins of most coelacanths including Latimeria suggests an adaptation to generally slow swimming with the ability to suddenly accelerate for short speed bursts. Considerable diversity in fossil coelacanth body shape suggests that not all coelacanths had the same life habits as living Latimeria. For example the unusual large forked tail of the Early Triassic Rebellatrix suggests an adaptation to fast swimming similar to tuna, suggesting that it was a cruising predator, with its tapered asymmetrical other fins likely being used for fine control. A study of the ecology of 5 contemporaneous coelacanth species from the Lower Carboniferous Bear Gulch Limestone, found that they likely exhibited differing life habits indicating niche partitioning. The caudal fin shape of one of these coelacanths, Allenypterus, which diverges strongly from those known from other coelacanths in having short rays and extending far forwards on the body, was suggested to be an adaptation to very slow undulatory movement, similar to living notopterid and gymnotid fish and that it probably lived in weedy, sheltered environments, with its small teeth and small gape suggesting that it consumed small, slow moving soft bodied prey. Another larger coelacanth species from Bear Gulch, nicknamed "long body" in the study (and currently recognised as the genus Caridosuctor) was likely a slow cruising predator with its diet including fish and crustaceans as indicated by stomach contents, and was probably an environmental generalist.

It is suggested that coelacanths living and extinct utilize(d) suction feeding to capture prey, and that this trait had evolved early in their evolutionary history, by the end of the Devonian. Stomach contents of the mawsoniid Axelrodichthys from the Early Cretaceous of Brazil suggests that it consumed fish, swallowing its prey whole, as its teeth were too small to effectively break it up in the mouth. While living Latimeria coelacanths are entirely marine, some species of fossil coelacanths, especially the mawsoniids, were found in deposits corresponding to brackish and even freshwater environments, suggesting that they either permanently inhabited freshwater and/or migrated between salt and freshwater (euryhaline).

=== Reproduction ===
Living Latimeria coelacanths are ovoviviparous, meaning that the female retains the fertilized eggs within her body while the embryos develop during a gestation period of five years. Typically, females are larger than the males; their scales and the skin folds around the cloaca differ. The male coelacanth has no distinct copulatory organs, just a cloaca, which has a urogenital papilla surrounded by erectile caruncles. It is hypothesized that the cloaca everts to serve as a copulatory organ. Living coelacanth eggs are large, with only a thin layer of membrane to protect them. Embryos hatch within the female and eventually are born alive, which is a rarity in fish. This was only discovered when the American Museum of Natural History dissected its first coelacanth specimen in 1975 and found it pregnant with five embryos. Young coelacanths resemble the adult, the main differences being an external yolk sac, larger eyes relative to body size and a more pronounced downward slope of the body. The juvenile coelacanth's broad yolk sac hangs below the pelvic fins. The scales and fins of the juvenile are completely matured; however, it does lack odontodes, which it gains during maturation.

Female Latimeria coelacanths give birth to live young, called "pups", in groups of between five and 25 fry at a time; the pups are capable of surviving on their own immediately after birth. Their reproductive behaviors are not well known, but it is believed that they are not sexually mature until after 20 years of age. It was thought that gestation time was 13 to 15 months, though research carried out in 2021 now suggests a gestation period of up to five years, which is 1.5 years longer than the deep-sea frilled shark, the previous record holder.

== Relation to humans ==
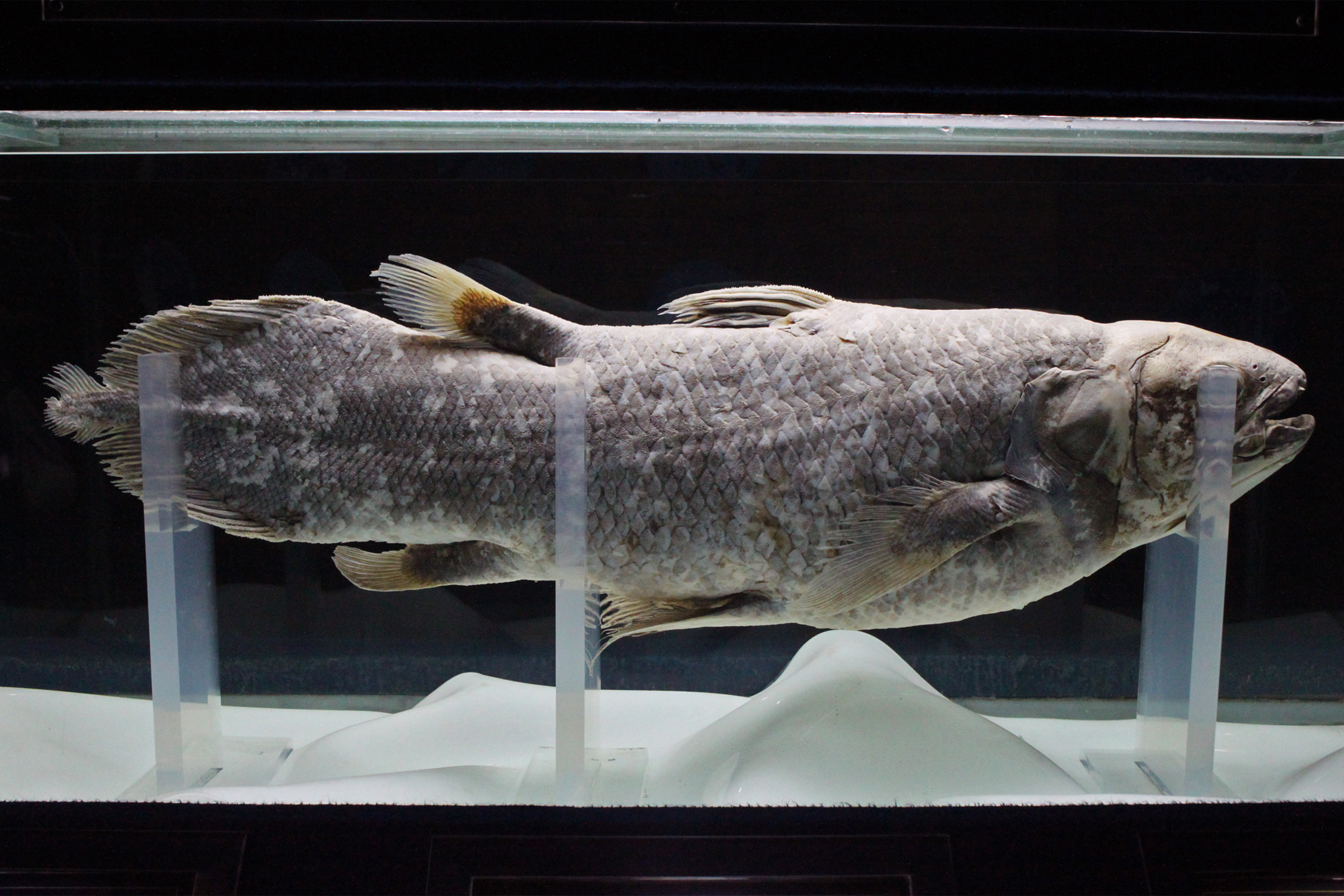
Specimen at Sea World Indonesia

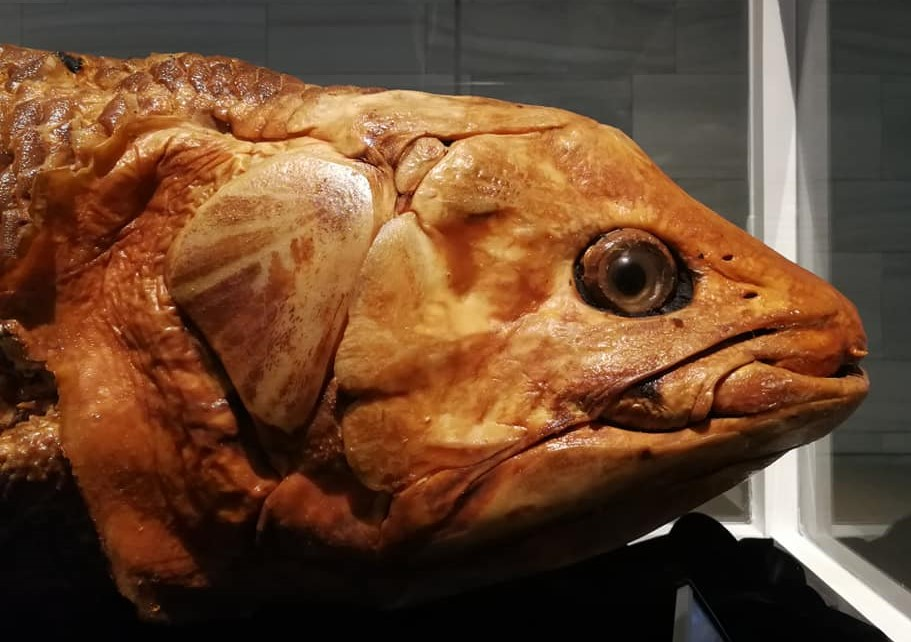
At Abdallah Al Salem Cultural Center in Kuwait

Living Latimeria coelacanths are considered a poor source of food for humans and likely most other fish-eating animals, as coelacanth flesh has large amounts of oil, urea, wax esters, and other compounds that give the flesh a distinctly unpleasant flavor, make it difficult to digest, and can cause diarrhea. Their scales themselves secrete mucus, which combined with the excessive oil their bodies produce, make coelacanths a slimy food. Where the coelacanth is more common, local fishermen avoid it because of its potential to sicken consumers. As a result, living coelacanths have no real commercial value apart from being coveted by museums and private collectors.

=== Conservation ===
Because of their remote deep sea habitat, the conservation status of living coelacanths is difficult to characterize. The IUCN currently classifies L. chalumnae as "critically endangered". L. menadoensis is considered Vulnerable. The major threat towards the coelacanth is the accidental capture by fishing operations (bycatch), especially commercial deep-sea trawling.
