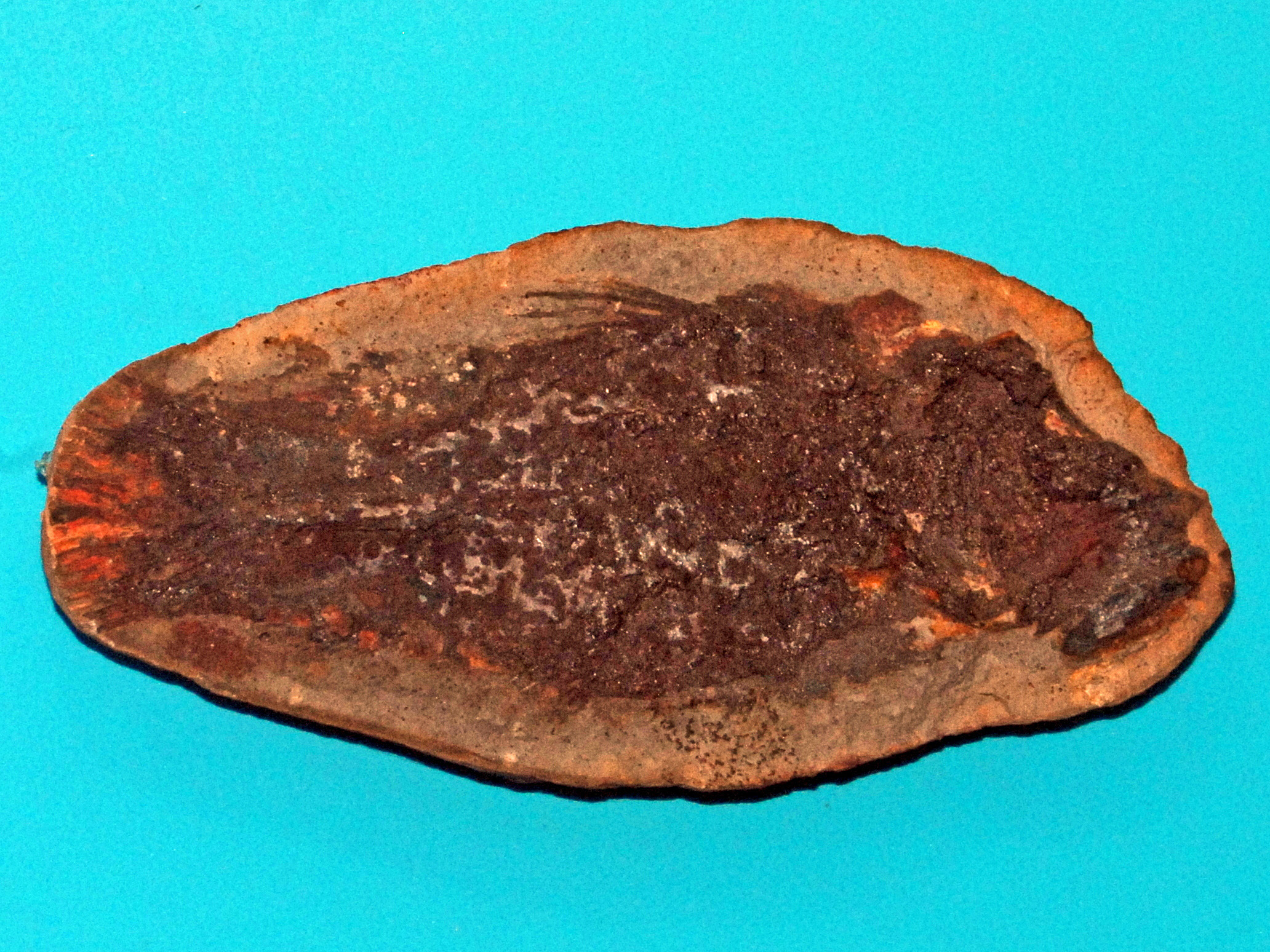
- Whiteia woodwardi

Scientific classification
- Kingdom: Animalia
- Phylum: Chordata
- Class: Actinistia
- Order: Coelacanthiformes
- Family: †Whiteiidae; Schultze, 1993

Genera
- †Garnbergia; †Guizhoucoelacanthus; †Whiteia

= Whiteiidae =

Whiteiidae Temporal range: Triassic

Extinct family of coelacanths

Whiteiidae is an extinct family of prehistoric coelacanth fishes which lived during the Triassic period. Torino, Soto, and Perea (2021) did not support this clade as it was not found to be monophyletic in their analysis, however, Ferrante and Cavin (2025) found the family to be a valid clade.
