= Wimania =

Wimania Temporal range: early Olenekian
- Skull diagram of W. sinuosa

Scientific classification
- Kingdom: Animalia
- Phylum: Chordata
- Class: Actinistia
- Order: Coelacanthiformes
- Family: †Axeliidae
- Genus: †Wimania; Stensiö, 1921

Type species
- †Wimania sinuosa Stensiö, 1921

Other species
- †Wimania? multistriata Stensiö, 1921

Synonyms
- Leioderma Stensiö, 1918)

Extinct genus of coelacanths

Wimania is an extinct genus of coelacanth lobe-finned fish that lived during the Early Triassic epoch in what is now Svalbard. Fossils were found in the Smithian (early Olenekian) aged "Fish Niveau" of the Lusitaniadalen Member of the Vikinghøgda Formation. Wimania belongs to the family Coelacanthidae. It is named after Carl Wiman.

== Species ==
- Wimania multistriata Stensiö, 1921
- Wimania sinuosa Stensiö, 1921
