= Axelia =

Axelia Temporal range: early Olenekian
- Skull diagram

Scientific classification
- Kingdom: Animalia
- Phylum: Chordata
- Class: Actinistia
- Order: Coelacanthiformes
- Family: †Axeliidae
- Genus: †Axelia; Stensiö, 1921

Type species
- †Axelia robusta Stensiö, 1921

Other species
- †Axelia elegans Stensiö, 1921

Extinct genus of coelacanths

Axelia is an extinct genus of prehistoric lobe-finned fish, which belonged to the family of Coelacanthidae. It lived during the Smithian (early Olenekian) age of the Early Triassic epoch in what is now Spitsbergen, Svalbard. Fossils were found in the "Fish Niveau" of the Lusitaniadalen Member of the Vikinghøgda Formation.

Erik Stensiö named the genus after his brother Axel Andersson.

== See also ==
- Sarcopterygii
- List of sarcopterygians
- List of prehistoric bony fish
