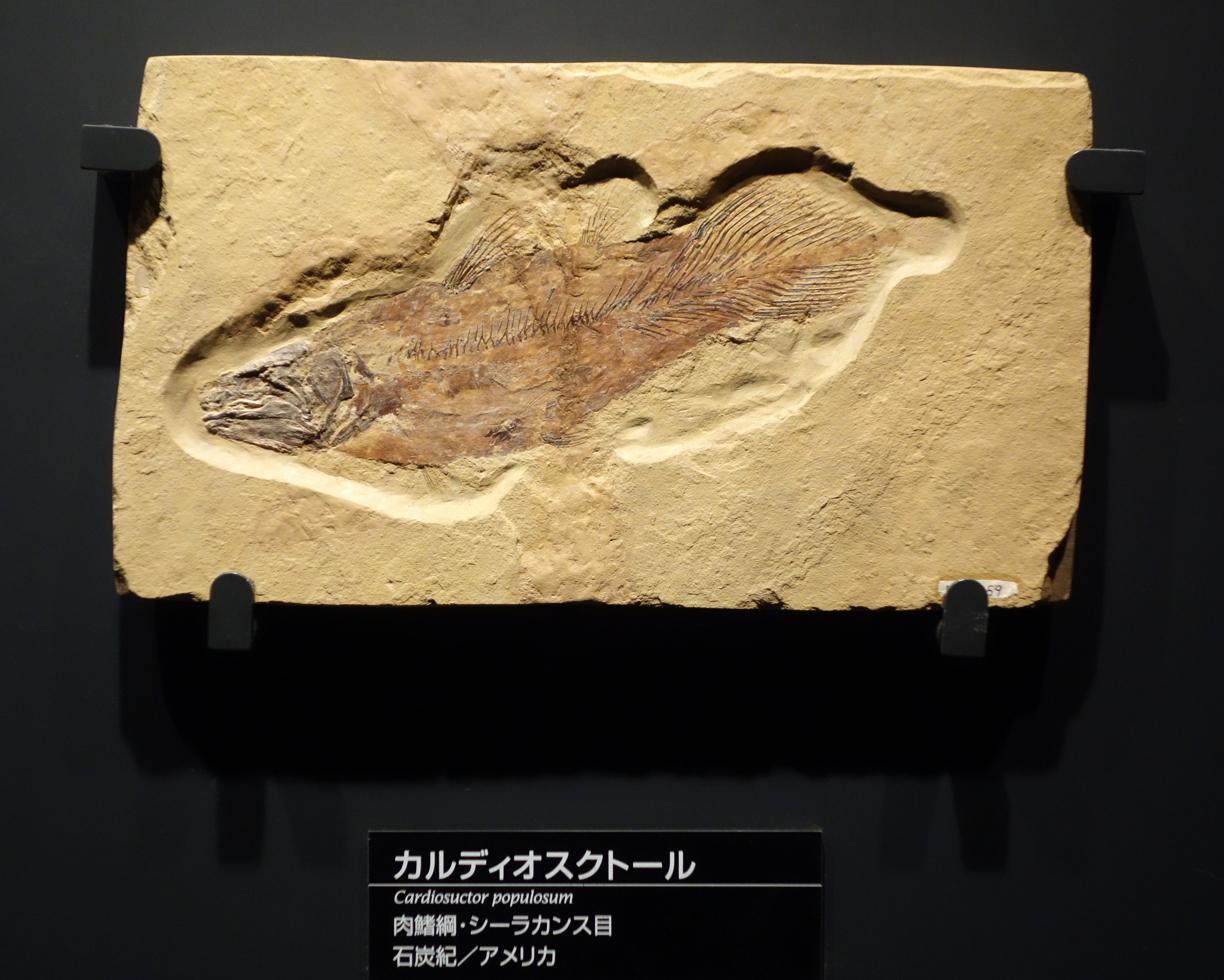
- Caridosuctor populosum

Scientific classification
- Kingdom: Animalia
- Phylum: Chordata
- Class: Actinistia
- Order: Coelacanthiformes
- Family: †Rhabdodermatidae; Berg, 1958

Genera
- †Caridosuctor; †Rhabdoderma; †Spermatodus

= Rhabdodermatidae =

Rhabdodermatidae Temporal range: Carboniferous–Early Triassic

Extinct family of coelacanths

Rhabdodermatidae is a family of prehistoric, coelacanthimorph, lobe-finned fishes which lived mainly during the Carboniferous period (about 359 - 299 million years ago), with some members surviving until the Early Triassic epoch (~250 myr ago).
