= Caridosuctor =

Caridosuctor Temporal range: Mississippian
- Caridosuctor populosum
- Diagram of the skull in top-down view

Scientific classification
- Kingdom: Animalia
- Phylum: Chordata
- Class: Actinistia
- Order: Coelacanthiformes
- Family: †Rhabdodermatidae
- Genus: †Caridosuctor; Lund & Lund, 1984
- Species: †C. populosum

Binomial name
- †Caridosuctor populosum Lund & Lund, 1984

Extinct genus of coelacanths

Caridosuctor is an extinct genus of marine coelacanth that lived during the Carboniferous period (Serpukhovian stage, about 318 - 326 million years ago). It contains a single species, C. populusum, with fossils known from the Bear Gulch Limestone in Montana. It is the largest and most common coelacanth known from Bear Gulch, reaching a body length of 21.7 centimetres (8.5 in). In a 1985 study in which the species was nicknamed "long body", it was suggested to be a slow cruising predator with stomach contents indicating that its diet included fish and crustaceans (including the early mantis shrimp Tyrannophontes) and was probably an environmental generalist.
