= Lochmocercus =

Scientific classification
- Domain: Eukaryota
- Kingdom: Animalia
- Phylum: Chordata
- Clade: Sarcopterygii
- Class: Actinistia
- Family: Hadronectoridae
- Genus: †Lochmocercus; Lund and Lund 1984

Extinct genus of fishes

Lochmocercus is an extinct genus of prehistoric coelacanth fishes which lived during the Carboniferous Period.

== See also ==
- Sarcopterygii
- List of sarcopterygians
- List of prehistoric bony fish
