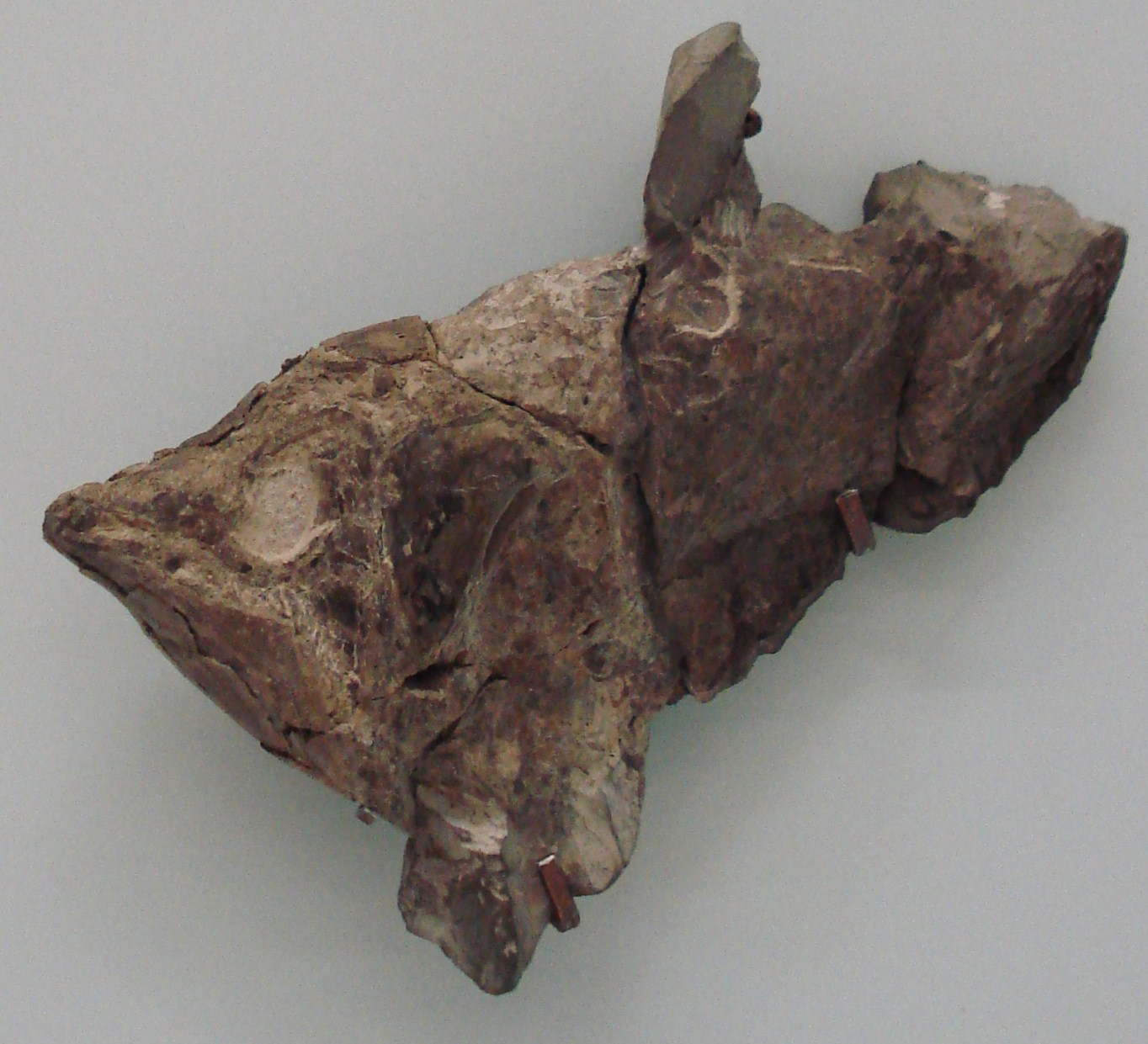
- Specimen at Museum für Naturkunde Stuttgart
- Skull diagram

Scientific classification
- Kingdom: Animalia
- Phylum: Chordata
- Class: Actinistia
- Order: Coelacanthiformes
- Family: †Whiteiidae
- Genus: †Garnbergia; Martin & Wenz, 1984
- Species: †G. ommata

Binomial name
- †Garnbergia ommata Martin & Wenz, 1984

= Garnbergia =

Garnbergia Temporal range: Anisian to Norian

Extinct genus of fish

Garnbergia is an extinct genus of prehistoric marine coelacanth that lived during the Triassic period. It was discovered by Martin and Wenz in 1984. It comprises a single species, Garnbergia ommata, known from the Anisian stage of the Middle Triassic-aged Muschelkalk of Germany. In addition, an isolated scale, tentatively assigned to G. ommata, is known from the middle Norian-aged Pardonet Formation of British Columbia, Canada.

== Classification ==
In a 2017 phylogeny, Garnbergia was recovered as the sister-group of all other Latimeriidae. However, a 2025 morphological analysis of nearly all Mesozoic coelacanths instead identified it as a member of the more basal family Whiteiidae.

== See also ==
- Prehistoric fish
- List of prehistoric bony fish
