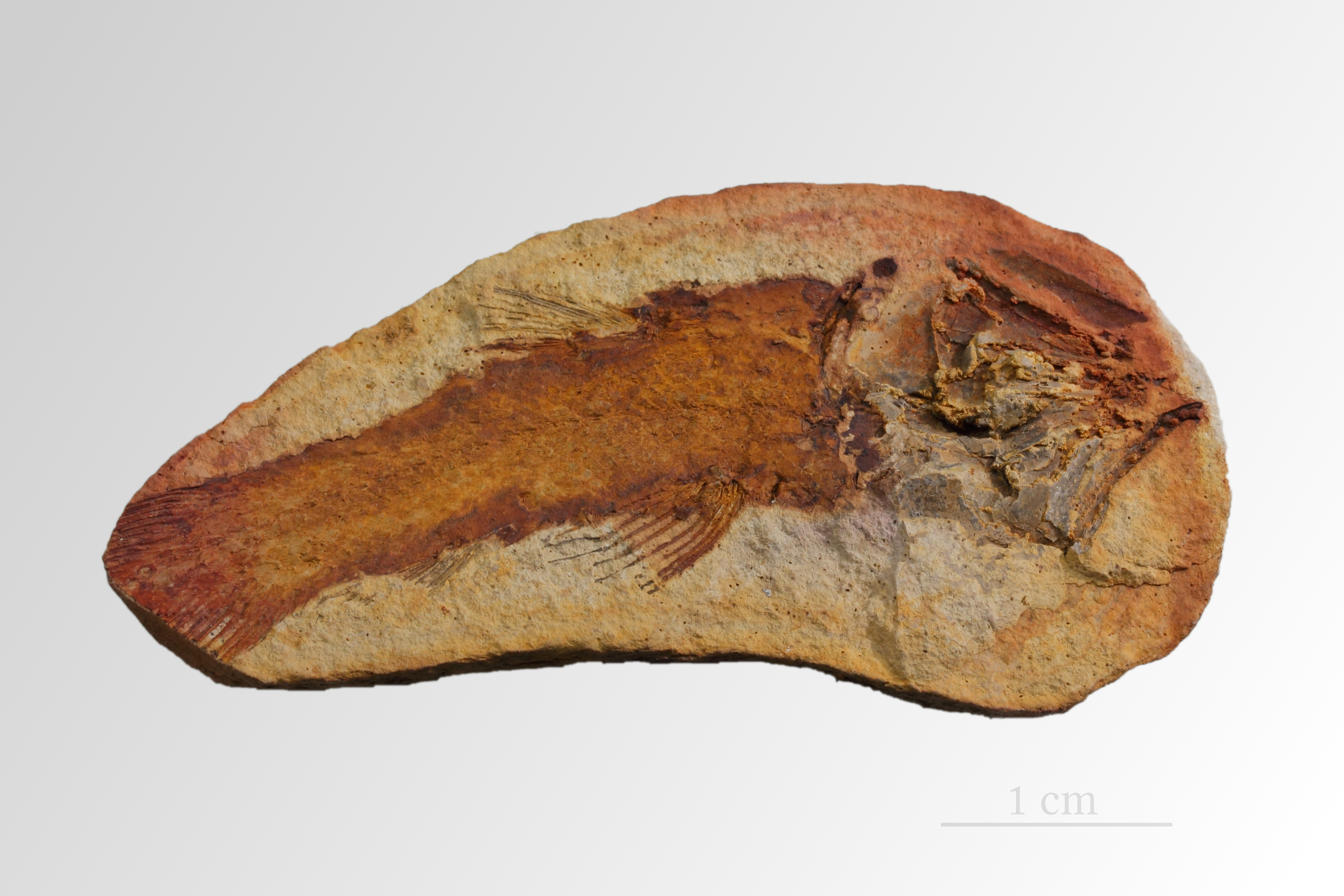
- Whiteia woodwardi fossil
- Skull diagram of W. woodwardi

Scientific classification
- Kingdom: Animalia
- Phylum: Chordata
- Class: Actinistia
- Order: Coelacanthiformes
- Family: †Whiteiidae
- Genus: †Whiteia; Moy-Thomas, 1935

Type species
- †Whiteia woodwardi Moy-Thomas, 1935

Other species
- †W. africana (Broom 1905); †W. anniae Xu et al., 2025; †W.? banffensis (Lambe, 1916); †W. gigantea Brownstein, 2023; †W. nielseni Forey, 1998; †W. oishii Yabumoto & Brito, 2016; †W. tuberculata Moy-Thomas, 1935; †W. uyenoteruyai Yabumoto et al., 2019

= Whiteia =

Whiteia Temporal range: Triassic

Extinct genus of coelacanths

Whiteia is an extinct genus of prehistoric coelacanth fish which lived during the Triassic period. It is named after Errol White.

== Taxonomy ==
The type species is Whiteia woodwardi from the Early Triassic of Madagascar. Other Early Triassic species are W. anniae, W. tuberculata, W. uyenoteruyai (both Madagascar), W. nielseni (East Greenland), W.? banffensis (Alberta, Canada), W. africana (South Africa) and W. anniae (Anhui, China). Two species, W. oishii (West Timor, Indonesia) and W. gigantea (Texas, United States), are of Late Triassic age.

The nominal species Coelacanthus evolutus Beltan, 1980 is a junior synonym of Whiteia woodwardi.
