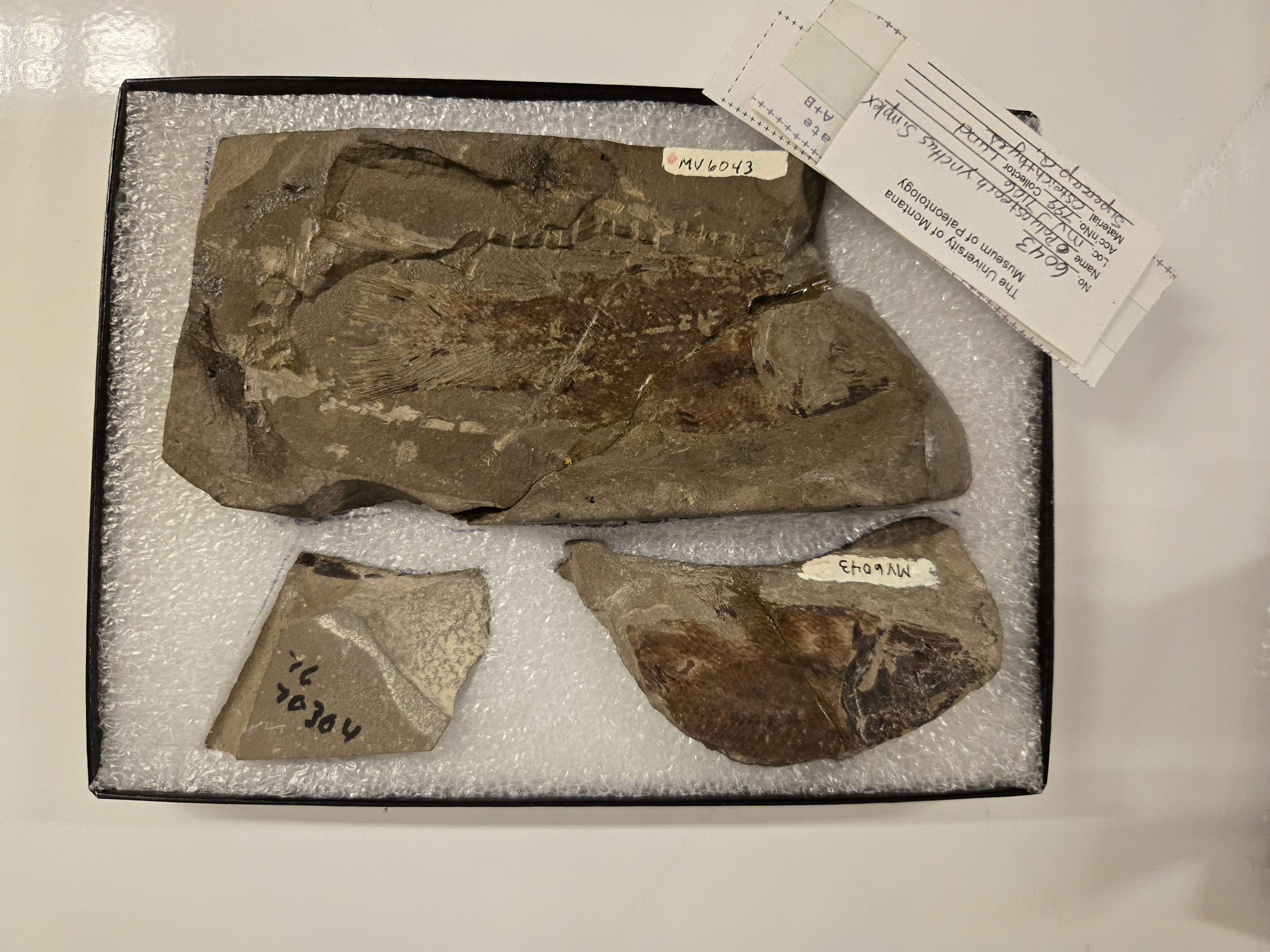

Scientific classification
- Kingdom: Animalia
- Phylum: Chordata
- Class: Actinistia
- Family: Hadronectoridae
- Genus: †Polyosteorhynchus; Lund & Lund, 1984

Type species
- Polyosteorhynchus simplex Lund & Lund, 1984

= Polyosteorhynchus =

Polyosteorhynchus Temporal range: Carboniferous

Extinct genus of coelacanths

Polyosteorhynchus is an extinct genus of coelacanths which lived during the Carboniferous period (Serpukhovian stage, about 318 - 326 million years ago). It's remains have been found in the Bear Gulch Limestone. The size of Polyosteorhynchus was about 3,5 – 19 cm long.
