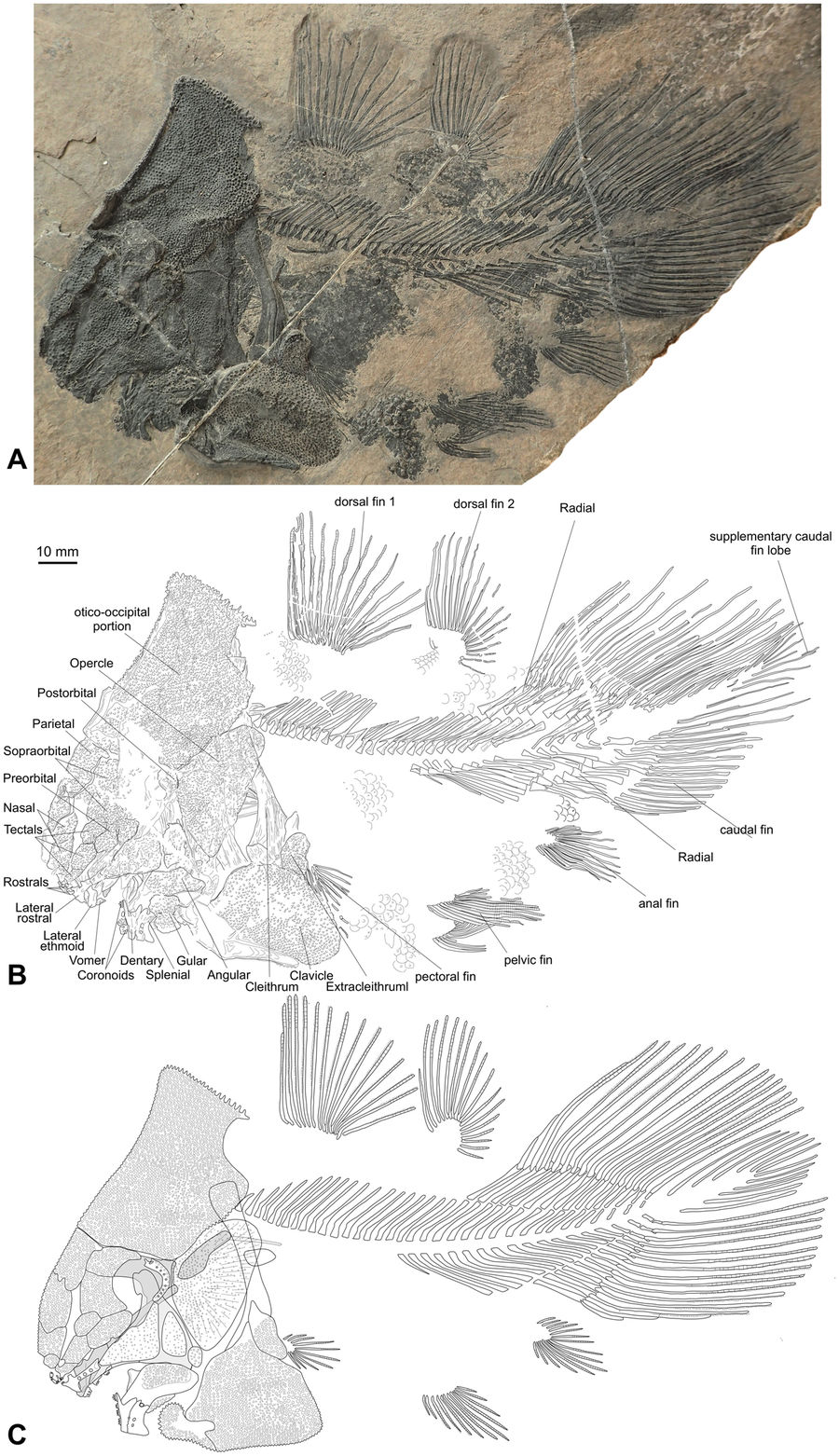
- Fossil and digram of the skeleton of Foreyia maxkuhni

Scientific classification
- Kingdom: Animalia
- Phylum: Chordata
- Class: Actinistia
- Order: Coelacanthiformes
- Suborder: Latimerioidei
- Family: Latimeriidae
- Genus: †Foreyia; Cavin et al., 2017

Type species
- Foreyia maxkuhni Cavin et al., 2017

= Foreyia =

Foreyia Temporal range: Lower Ladinian, 240.91 Ma

Extinct genus of coelacanths

Foreyia is an extinct genus of coelacanth lobe-finned fish which lived during the Middle Triassic period in what is now Canton of Graubünden, Switzerland. It contains a single species F. maxkuhni.

== Naming ==
The generic name honors the late Peter L. Forey for his contributions to the study of coelacanth fishes. The specific epithet honors Max Kuhn, who had been instrumental in preparing fossils from Monte San Giorgio for 12 years, including the holotype and paratype specimens of F. maxkuhni.

== Description and classification ==
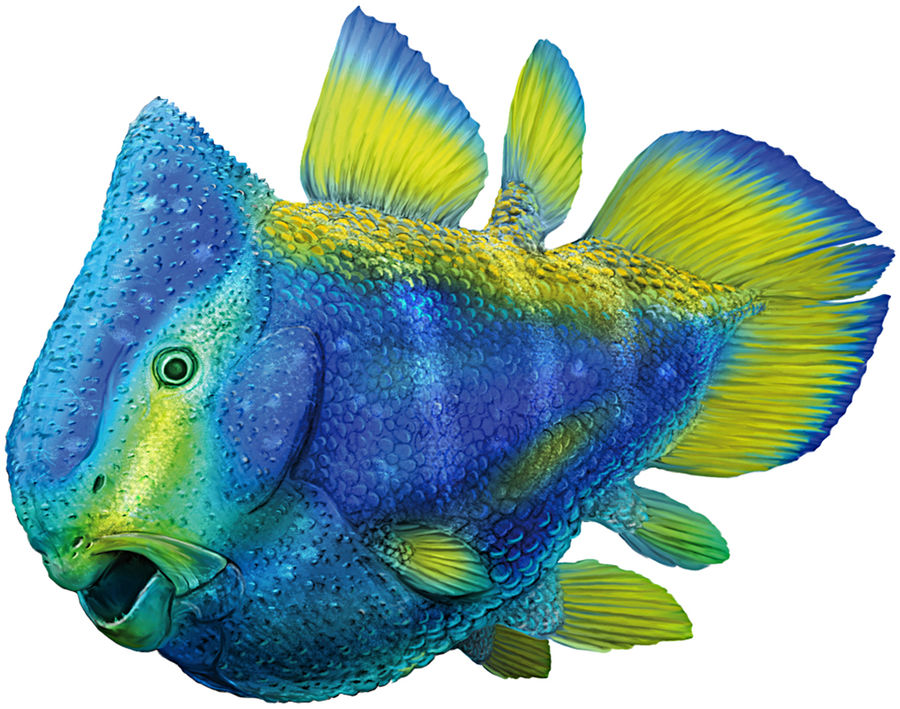
Restoration of the coelacanth Foreyia maxkuhni. Artwork by Alain Bénéteau.

F. maxkuhni is an aberrant-looking member of the family Latimeriidae, with a proportionally enormous head, a curved, beak-like maxilla, an underbite, and a low, horn-like point on its otherwise dome-like head. Despite such a bizarre appearance, phylogenetic analyses squarely place F. maxkuhni as the sister taxon of Ticinepomis, another latimeriid also found in the same strata. The two latimeriids share numerous anatomical traits with each other, strongly suggesting a close relation. Foreyia, Ticinepomis and Rieppelia are grouped in the subfamily Ticinepomiinae.

Foreyia in cladogram after Toriño et al., 2021.

- Latimeriidae
  - †Garnbergia
  - - †Diplurus
    - - - †Megalocoelacanthus
        - †Libys
      - - - †Ticinepomis
          - †Foreyia
        - - †Holophagus
          - - †Undina
            - - †Macropoma
              - - †Swenzia
                - Latimeria
