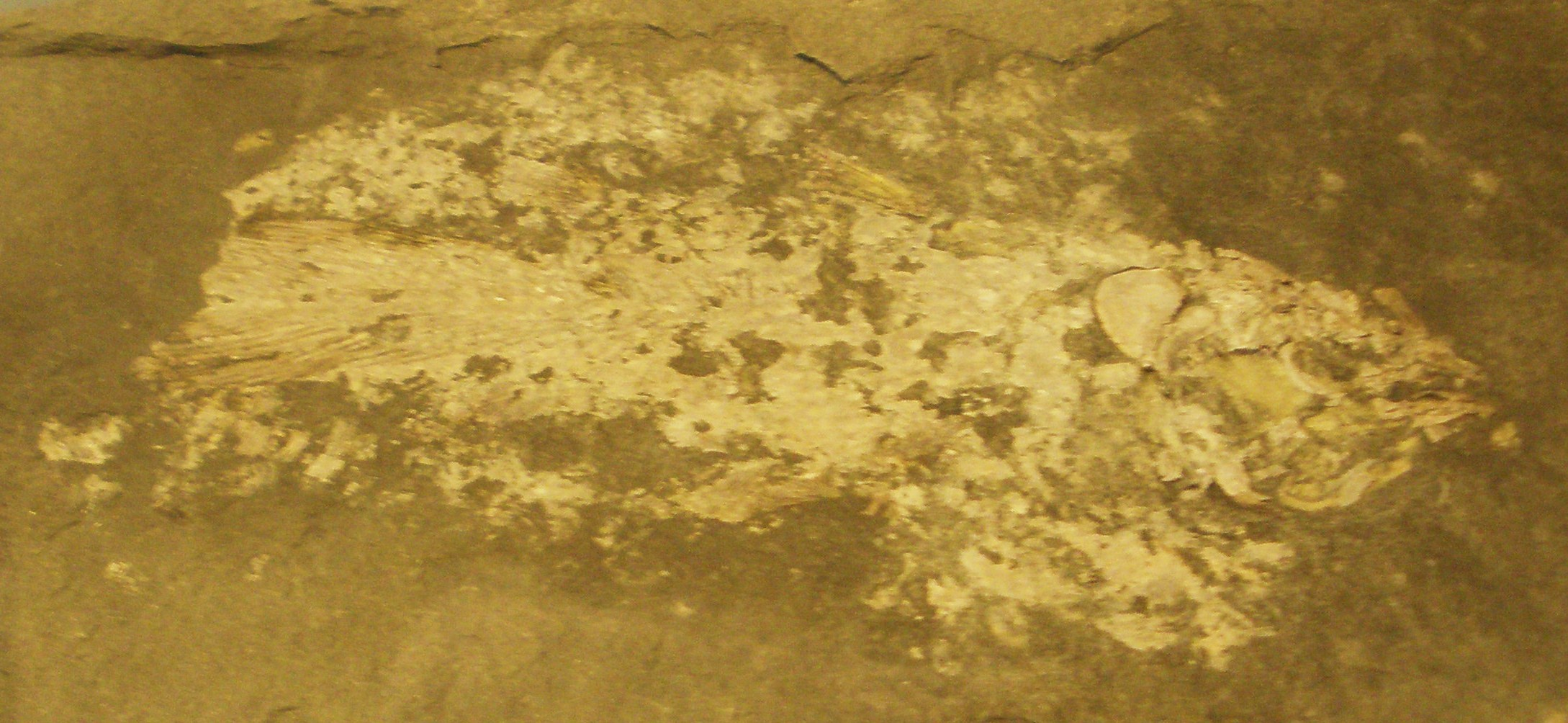
- Fossil
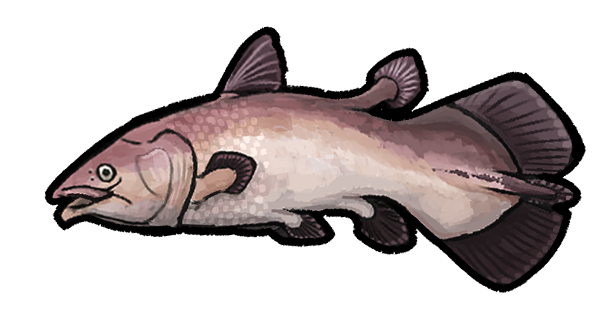
- Reconstruction

Scientific classification
- Kingdom: Animalia
- Phylum: Chordata
- Class: Actinistia
- Order: Coelacanthiformes
- Suborder: Latimerioidei
- Family: Latimeriidae
- Genus: †Ticinepomis; Rieppel, 1980

Type species
- †Ticinepomis peyeri Rieppel, 1980

Other species
- †T. ducanensis Ferrante, Furrer, Martini et Cavin, 2023

= Ticinepomis =

Ticinepomis Temporal range: Lower Ladinian, 240.91 Ma

Extinct genus of coelacanths

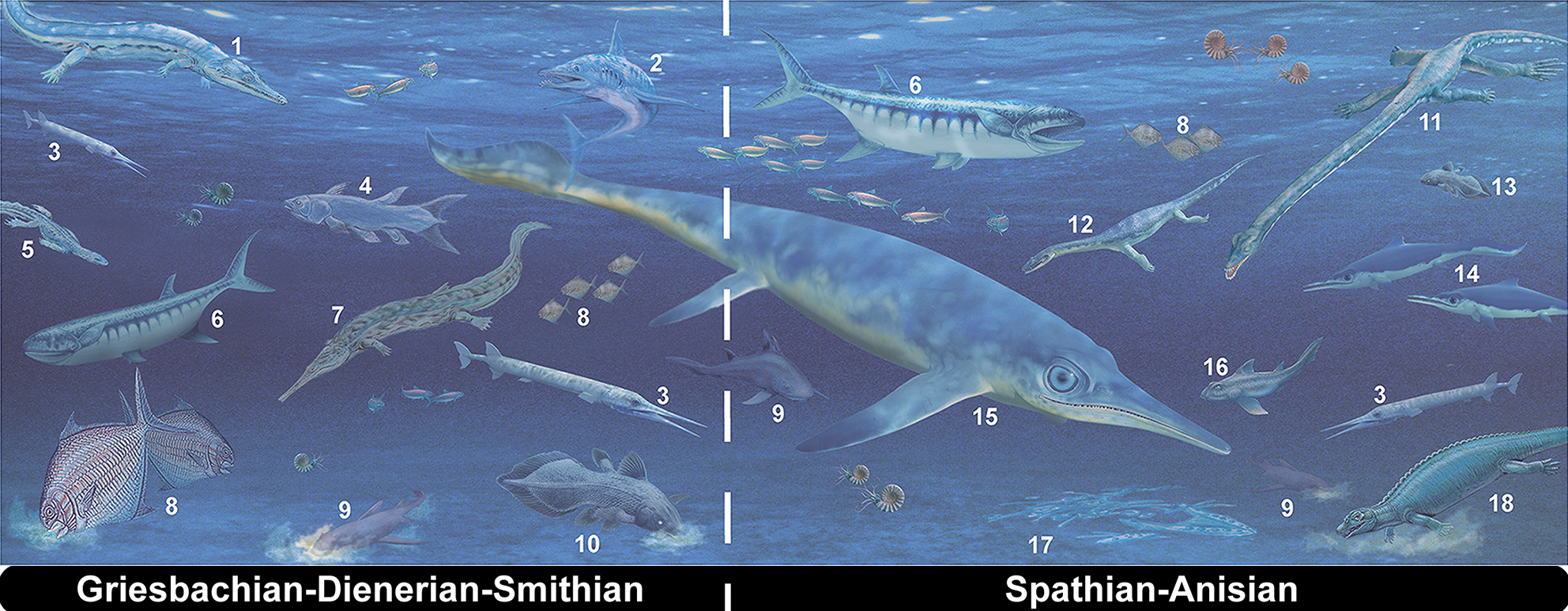
Marine life of the Early and early Middle Triassic: Ticinepomis (13)

Ticinepomis is an extinct genus of coelacanth lobe-finned fish which lived during the Middle Triassic period in what is now Switzerland. It contains two species, T. peyeri and T. ducanensis.

Specimens of the species T. peyeri, which was named after Bernhard Peyer, are most common in the Besano Formation (or Grenzbitumenzone) of Monte San Giorgio in canton Ticino. Other coelacanths from Monte San Giorgio include a larger species (tentatively referred to Holophagus picenus) from the Besano Formation, and a species of Heptanema from the Meride Limestone.

Larger Ticinepomis specimens have been found in the Prosanto Formation of canton Graubünden, originally referred to as Ticinepomis cf. T. peyeri. A revision showed that this material belongs to a new species, T. ducanensis, remains of which were also discovered in the Besano Formation of canton Ticino. The Prosanto Formation also produced the unusual coelacanths Foreyia and Rieppelia.

== Classification ==
Skull diagram

Ticinepomis was originally described as being a member of the family Coelacanthidae, being similar to Coelacanthus, Holophagus and Undina. Later, T. peyeri was placed in Latimeriidae. The bizarre Prosanto Formation latimeriid Foreyia is thought to be T. peyeri's closest relative, as they share many features despite their drastically contrasting appearances.
