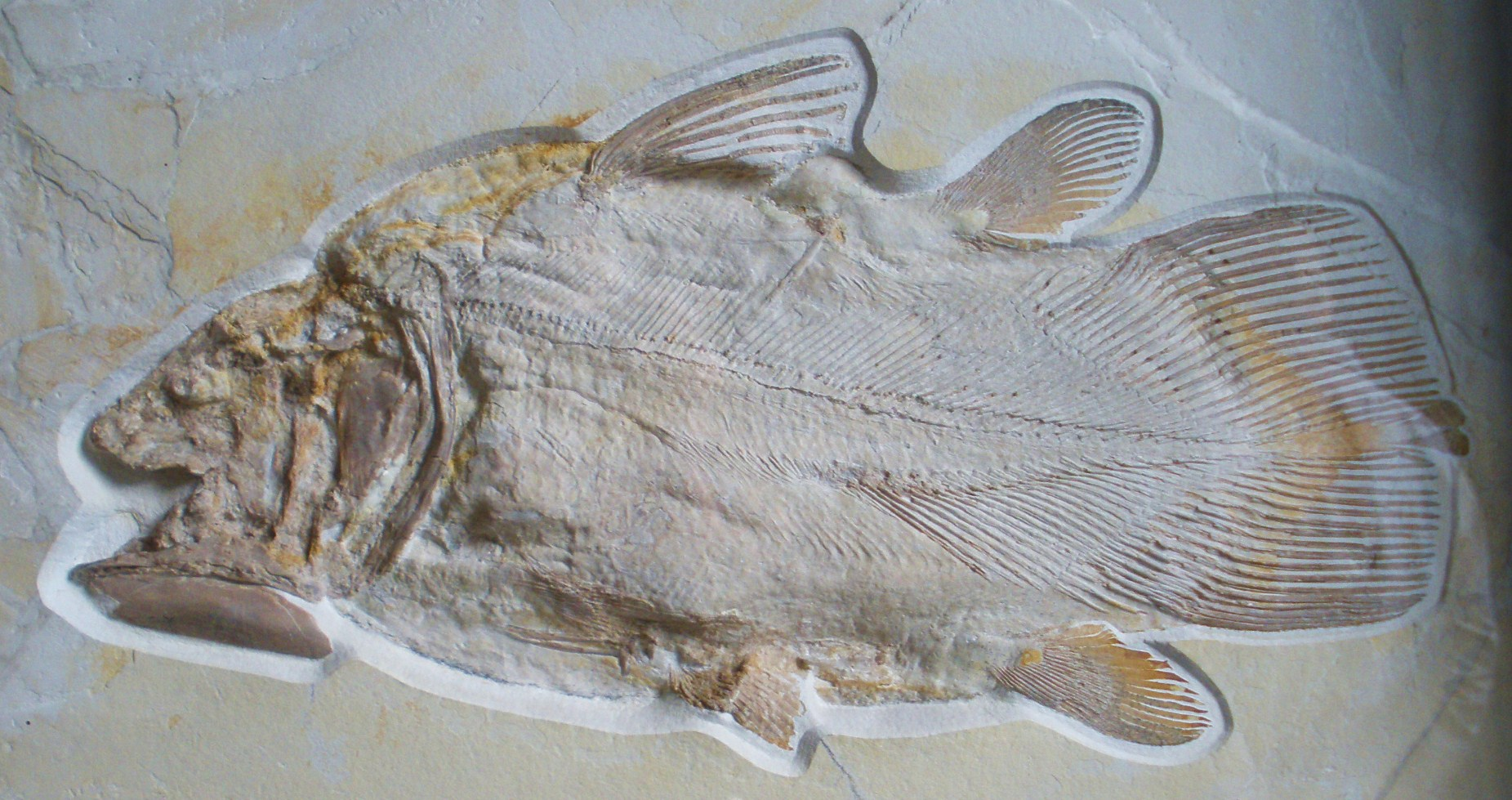
- Specimen of L. polypterus (=L. superbus), Teylers Museum
- Skull diagram of L. polypterus

Scientific classification
- Kingdom: Animalia
- Phylum: Chordata
- Class: Actinistia
- Order: Coelacanthiformes
- Suborder: Latimerioidei
- Family: Latimeriidae
- Genus: †Libys; Münster, 1842

Species
- L. polypterus (Münster 1842) (type); L. callolepis Ferrante, Menkveld-Gfeller & Cavin, 2022

= Libys =

Libys Temporal range: Early to Late Jurassic (Toarcian to Tithonian)

Extinct genus of coelacanths

Libys is an extinct genus of marine coelacanth fish from the Early to Late Jurassic of Europe. It belonged to the family Latimeriidae, making it closely related to the modern coelacanths.

== Taxonomy ==
Two species are known, both separated by a period of over 34 million years:

- L. polypterus Münster, 1842 (type species) - Late Jurassic (Tithonian) of Germany (Solnhofen Limestone) (=L. superbus Reis, 1888)
- L. callolepis Ferrante, Menkveld-Gfeller & Cavin, 2022 - Early Jurassic (Toarcian) of Switzerland (Stadelgraben Formation)

The type species, Libys polypterus, was described in 1842 on the basis of fragmentary remains. A second species, L. superbus, was described several decades later from the same localities on the basis of complete large specimens, but more recent studies suggest that both likely represent the same species, leading to L. superbus being synonymized with L. polypterus.

The second species, L. callolepis, is significantly older than polypterus and displays prominent morphological differences. The type specimen, representing the first coelacanth fossil ever found in Switzerland, was discovered in 1870, and given the name "Macropoma heeri" in 1873-1874 by Swiss paleontologist Carl von Fischer-Ooster, who passed away before he was able to publish the name, leaving it a nomen dubium. The specimen was redescribed in 2022, where it was identified as a species of Libys.

Libys has been identified as likely representing the sister genus to Megalocoelacanthus, a giant coelacanth known from the Late Cretaceous of North America.

== Description ==
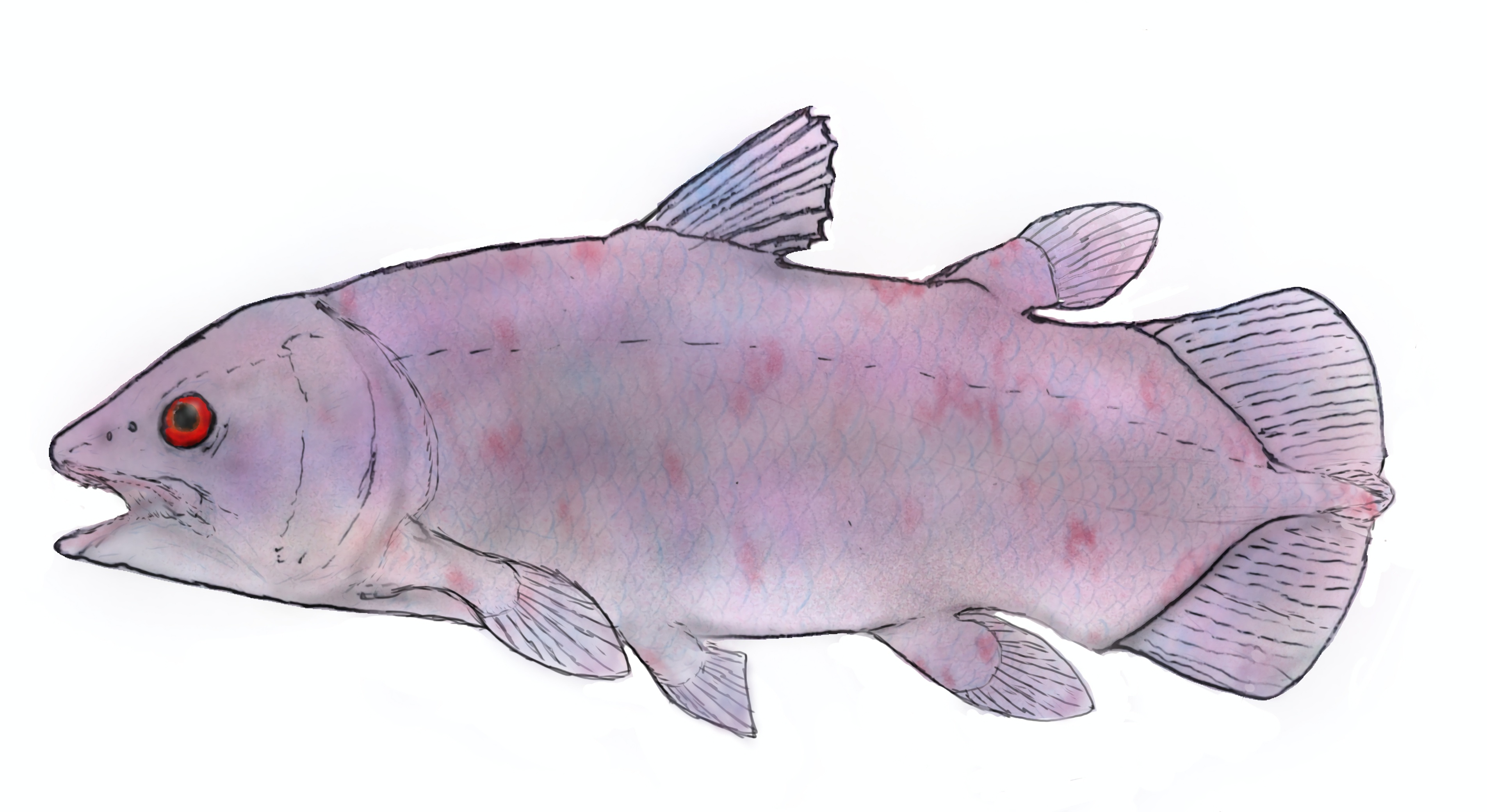
Reconstruction of L. polypterus

Libys had an exceptionally squat body, especially when compared to other coelacanths of the same period as Undina and Holophagus. Libys could reach 60 centimeters in length and was therefore a medium-sized coelacanth, with a short and high skull. The pectoral fins were quite long, while the tail was remarkably short and high.

Of the two known species, the older species L. callolepis had a snout consisting of consolidated bones, a trait uncommon in coelacanths and not seen in the younger species L. polypterus. In addition, L. callolepis had slender fin rays and heavily ornamented scales, while L. polypterus had a expanded fin rays and less ornamented scales.

== Gallery ==
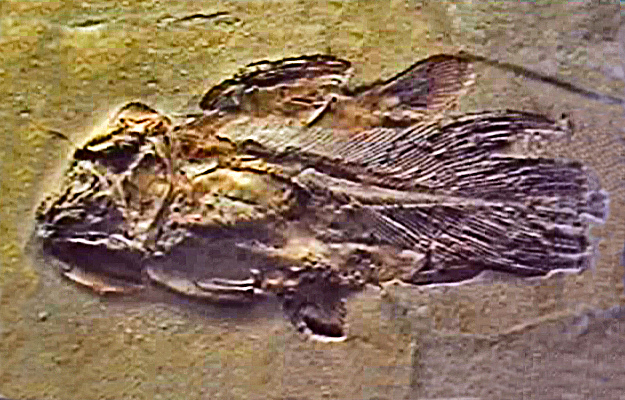
L. polypterus at the Naturhistorisches Museum, Wien
