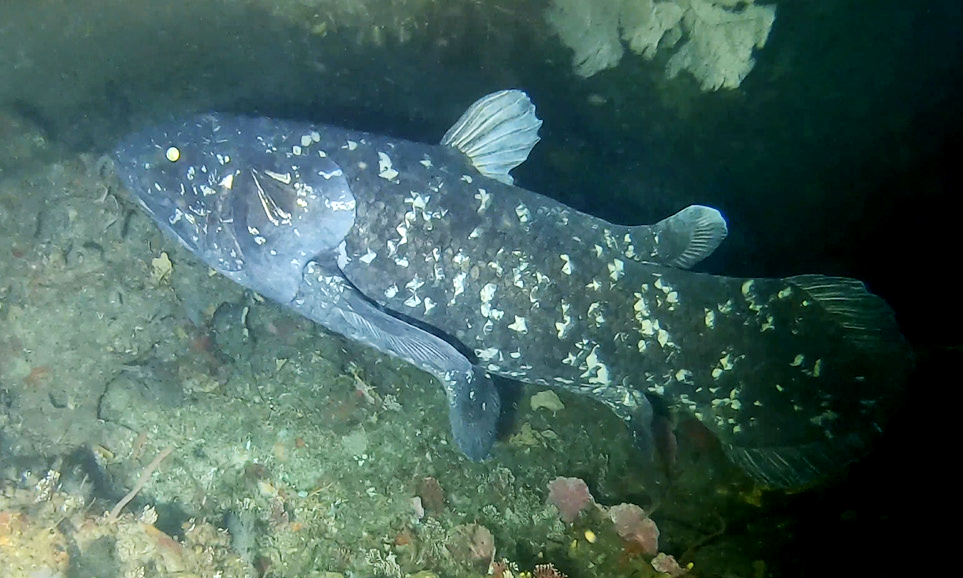
- West Indian Ocean coelacanth (Latimeria chalumnae)
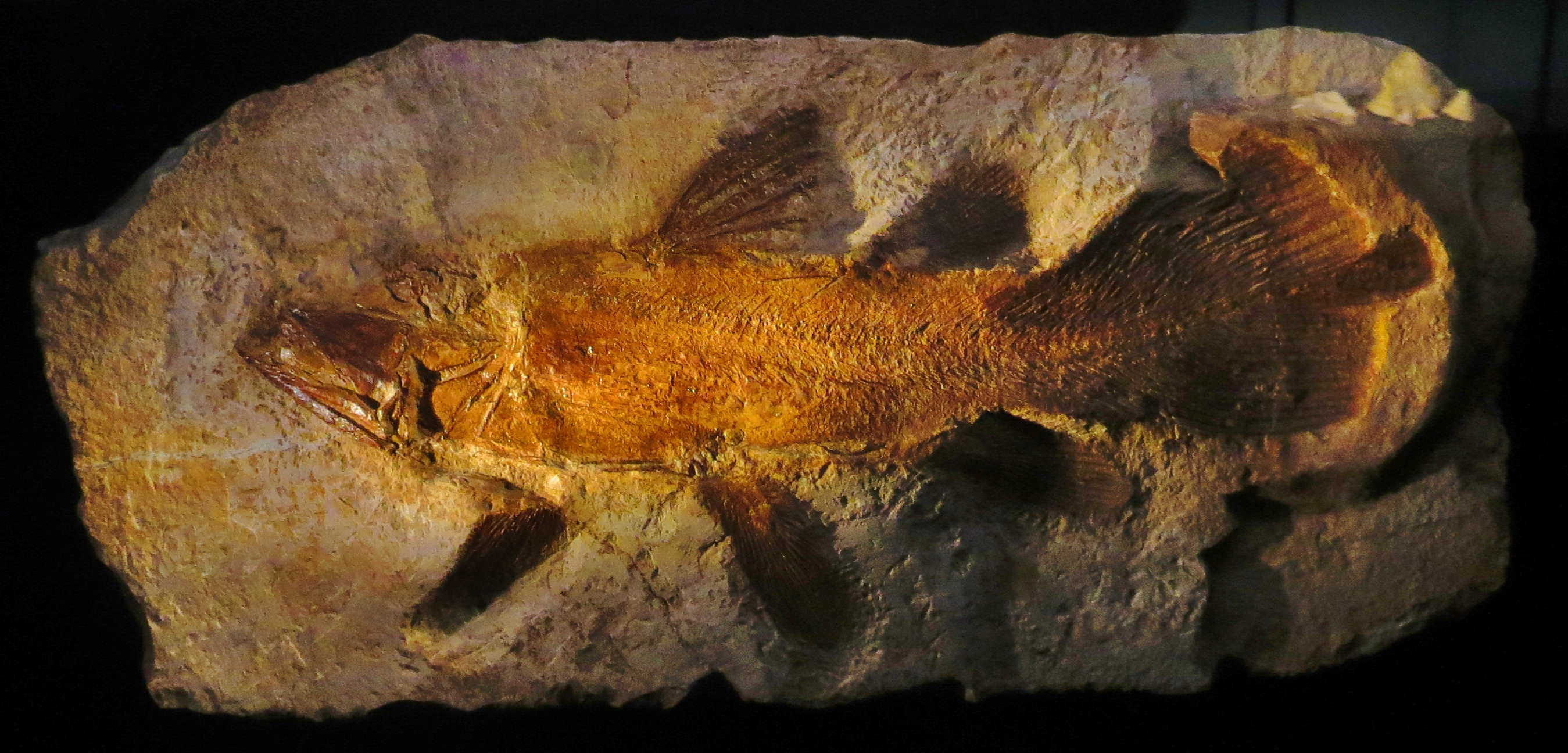
- Undina pencillata, an extinct species

Scientific classification
- Kingdom: Animalia
- Phylum: Chordata
- Class: Actinistia
- Order: Coelacanthiformes
- Suborder: Latimerioidei
- Family: Latimeriidae; Berg, 1940

Genera
- †Dobrogeria?; †Graulia?; †Loreleia?; †Macropomoides; Ticinepomiinae; †Ticinepomis; †Foreyia; †Rieppelia; Latimeriinae; †Holophagus; Latimeria; †Libys; †Swenzia; †Megalocoelacanthus; †Macropoma; †Undina

= Latimeriidae =

Latimeriidae Temporal range: Middle Triassic–present

Family of fishes

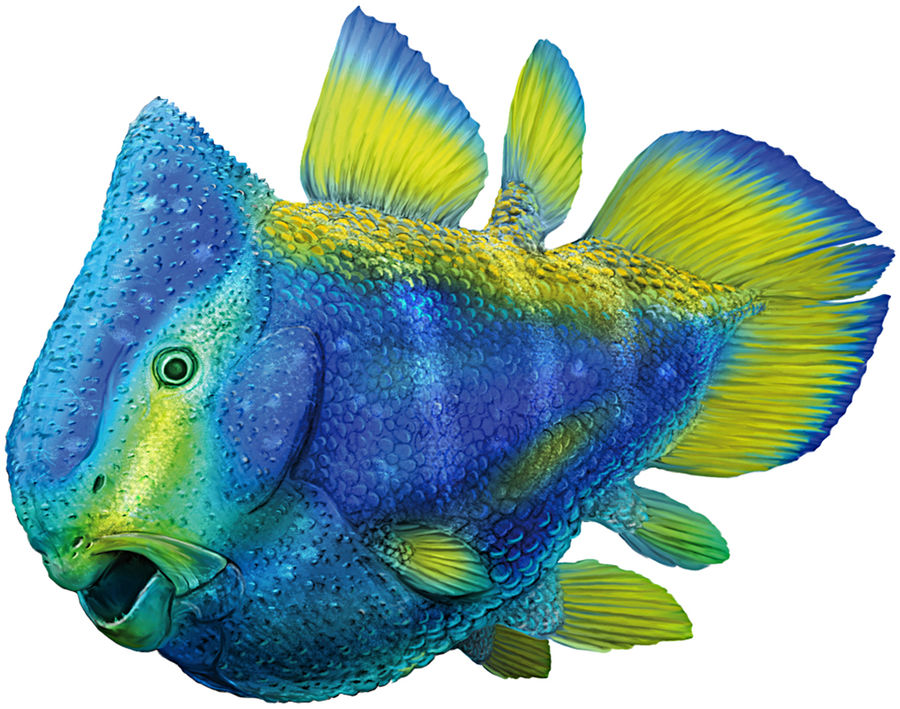
Life restoration of Foreyia, an aberrant latimeriid from the Triassic of Europe.

Latimeriidae is a family of coelacanths. It is the only and longest living extant group of coelacanths containing two extant species in the genus Latimeria. Today, they are found in deep waters off the coasts of southern Africa and east-central Indonesia. Several fossil genera dating back to the Triassic period are known from the Mesozoic of Europe, the Middle East, and the southeastern United States.

Currently, the largest known member of the family is Megalocoelacanthus which may have reached a total body length in excess of 4.5 metres.

== Evolution ==
Coelacanths are thought to have split from other lobed-finned fishes during the lower Devonian period. Latimeriids evolved during the Middle Triassic period possibly originating in the western Tethys Sea as many of their earliest species are known from areas that the sea formerly covered.

The fossil record of Latimeriids contains two major gaps. The first gap covers a 50 million year timespan between the Berriasian and the Albian ages which is the entirely of the lower Cretaceous period. The oldest member from the lower Cretaceous is Macropoma gombessae from the Gault Formation of England. Latomeriids would reappear during the Cenomanian with reports of reappearances during Albian being dubious. Three genera represents Latimeriid diversity during the upper Cretaceous, all of which are restricted to marine environments; Macropoma, Macropomoides and Megalocoelacanthus. The second gap in their fossil record would last from the Maastrichtian age extending throughout the entirety of the Cenozoic era.

The latimeriids are thought to have always been an exclusively marine group.

== Taxonomy ==
The family Latimeriidae are thought to be the sister group to Mawsoniidae, an extinct family of coelacanths that survived until the Late Cretaceous, inhabited both freshwater and marine habitats, and contained some very large species. Together, both families comprise the suborder Latimerioidei. This family itself is divided into two subfamilies; Latimeriinae and Ticinepomiinae. Genera belonging to the first subfamily include Latimeria, Swenzia, Libys, and Macropoma. Genera of the second family include Ticinepomis, Foreyia and Rieppelia. Genera that don’t belong to either subfamilies include Dobrogeria and Macropomoides.

Cladogram after Manuelli et al., 2026.

- Latimerioidei
  - †Mawsoniidae
    ⊞
    - †Indocoelacanthus
    - - †Diplurinae
      - †Mawsoniinae
    ⊟
  - Latimeriidae
    - †Dobrogeria
    - †Graulia
    - †Loreleia
    - - †Ticinepomiinae
        - †Ticinepomis
        - - †Foreyia
          - †Rieppelia
      - Latimeriinae
        - †Undina
        - - †Holophagus
          - - - Latimeria
              - †Swenzia
            - - †Macropoma
              - - †Libys
                - †Megalocoelacanthus
