= Grande Goule =

French dragon

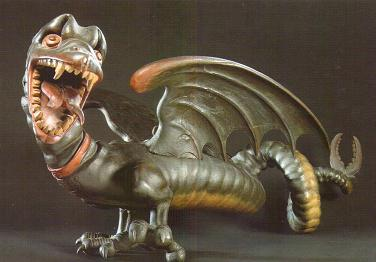
Wooden sculputure of the Grand’Goule by Jean Gargot (1677)

The Grande Goule or Grande-Goule (Poitevin dialect: Grand'Goule (Note: É.-V. Foucart (1840/1841): "...connu a Poitiers sous le nom de Grand'Goule ou Grand Gueule"; cited by Barbier de Montault (1881/1882): "[Monsieur] Foucart.. donne à la Grand'Gueule son vrai nom Grand'Goule pour se conformer au patois poitevin.") (Note: Given as Grand Goule by Merceron, but goule or gueule is a feminine noun.) (Note: Variant spelling of Grand'Gueule is given by Henri Clouzot, though the Grande-Gueule/Grand Gueule spelling may perhaps be reserved for its equivalent in Lyon according Clouzot himself in an earlier piece, as well as other sources.) (Note: aka boune sainte Veurmine. Cf. details below.), lit. 'Big Mouth' (Note: Edwards (2019) at note 58.) or 'Big Maw') is a folklore dragon that continues to be celebrated in the Poitou region (city of Poitiers) in France. (Note: Clouzot (1897) and (1900))

== General description ==
The Grand'Goule is considered to be a local version of the tarasque. (cf. § Parallels for other comparable local versions).

What has been claimed to be an early attestation to the Grande Goule is a charter dated 1466 noting that a "dragon" was among the banners and ensigns being promenaded through the streets of Poitiers for the Rogation days procession.

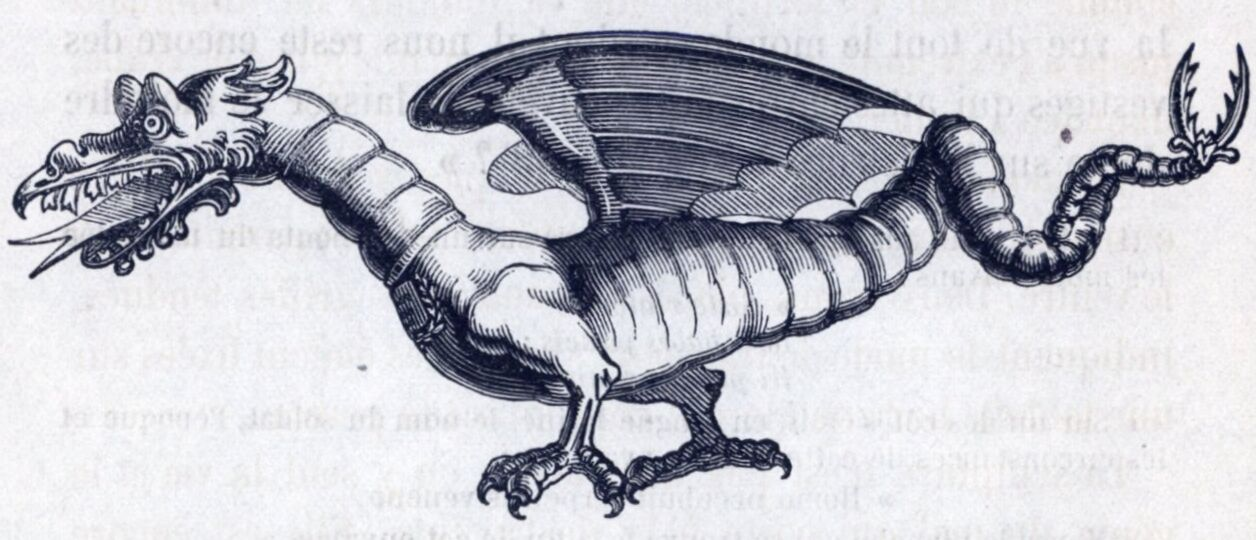
Drawing of Grand'Gueule (sculpture by Gargot, 1677)

A sculpture by cabinetmaker Jean Gargot in 1677, commissioned by the Abbey of Sainte-Croix at Poitiers, has survived into the modern age, (Note: Formerly in the keeping of Bibliothèque du Grand Séminaire in Poitiers.) and now housed in the Musée Sainte-Croix, in Poitiers. The painted sculpture depicts a dragon with a gaping maw, sharp claws, outspread wings, and a torturously curled lower body, terminating in a three-pronged tail, as described by Bellin de La Liborlière (1846), (Note: The dragon is compared to the "monster of Théramène", which figures in Racine's play Phèdre (1677).) (Note: "en bois sculpté et colorié, représentant un dragon aux ailes éployées, à la gueule béante, aux griffes acérées, à la croupe recourbée en replis tortueux comme celle du monstre de Théramène, et terminée de plus par une longue queue armée d'un dard à trois pointes", repeated near verbatim by Clouzot.) though the tail appears only to be two-pronged like a tailfin of a fish (cf. image right).

A description of the Rogation days procession at Poitiers during pre-Revolutionary (pre-1789) period states that together with the piece of the True Cross and banners, the dragon figure propped on a long baton was paraded through the streets. (Note: Bellin de La Liborlière (1846) also quoted in Barbier de Montault (1882), pp. 233–234)

During the May Rogation procession, a special round cake called the casse-museau (lit. 'muzzle-breaker' (Note: This is a sort of (cheesecake, as discussed by Paul Barbier, who renders casse-museau as "blow in the face".)) (Note: A footnote explains the naming of the "snout-breaker" as deriving from the tradition during the Black Procession at Évreux of flinging these flatcakes at the recipients' faces in a "grotesque (silly, prankish)" manner.) became an integral part of the festivities. The crowd pelted the parading dragon with these casse-museaux, filling the mouth of the Grand Goule effigy, while the golden pastries and cherries, some barely turning pink, delighted the children. (Note: Bellin de La Liborlière (1846) also quoted in Clouzot (1900), p. 164) The crowd, especially the women, would genuflect as the effigy passed by, press their palms together, or try to rub their rosaries on the dragon's scales, shouting Boune sainte veurmine ("good holy serpent").

== Dragon-quelling legends ==
According to legend, the monster haunted the cellars of the Abbey of Sainte-Croix at Poitiers, and used to devour the nuns who descended there, until St. Radegund expelled it. She harnessed the power of the piece of the True Cross held by the Abbey, and by making a sign of the cross, drove the monster out of the cellar into the river. (Note: Jean Bouchet (1518) L'histoire et cronique de Clotaire.)

According to an alternate legends, the Grand Goule which lurked in the underground passages of the abbey and fed on nuns had been vanquished by a condemned criminal who won his reprieve in recognition of his dragon-slaying deed, and not by Radegund. (Note: Though it is admitted by Foucart that the Ste. Radegund had founded the abbey that houses a True Cross, and the Grand Goule effigy follows the True Cross relic during the procession.) However, this criminal may not have lived to enjoy his amnesty, for according to a more detailed telling of the legend, by the time the man finally landed a fatal blow on the dragon, there had ensued such a pitched battle, of almost hand-to-hand combat nature, that his glass mask shattered underneath his visor, exposing him to venomous fumes that was his undoing.

== Parallels ==
The Grand'Goule is considered to be a local version of the tarasque. (Note: Clouzot: "cette traraque poitevine?") Other parallels given are the aforementioned Grand Gueule of Lyon, the Gargouille of Rouen, and the Graouilli (Graoully) of Metz (which also parades through Metz on Rogation days), as well as the Grand Dragon of Paris,these comparison having been made by Bellin de La Liborlière (1846) and later by Barbier de Montault (1882) and Clouzot (1897).

Other processional dragons of religious events that have been compared to the Grand Goule are the Chair-salée of Troyes, the Doudou (Ducasse) of Mons, Belgium, and the dragon of Louvain (Leuven), and the papoires dragons of Amiens.

== Eponymy ==
In Poitiers, a nightclub (discotheque) called Grand'Goule (est. 1965) had served food and drink to its clientele in a dungeon-like atmosphere, (Note: Edwards (2019): "discotheque opposite the church of Sainte-Radegonde" at note 58.) The club has announced its permanent closure effective 27 June 2026, after 61 years of operation. (Note: In a 2016 incident, an inebriated patron ejected by the club's bouncers subsequently stumbled off a cliff and died, and the parents wanted to hold the club accountable. This is not mentioned as a contributor to the news piece announcing the closure.)

A choir named after the dragon has a long history.

== See also ==
- Chair-salée of Troyes, associated with Lupus of Troyes/Abbey of Saint Loup, Troyes
- Ducasse de Mons – Traditional folk festival in Mons, Belgium
- Le Grand Bailla of Reims - similar creature; aka kraula
- Graoully – Dragon in the folklore of the French city Metz
- Tarasque – Creature from French mythology
- Gargouille of Rouen
