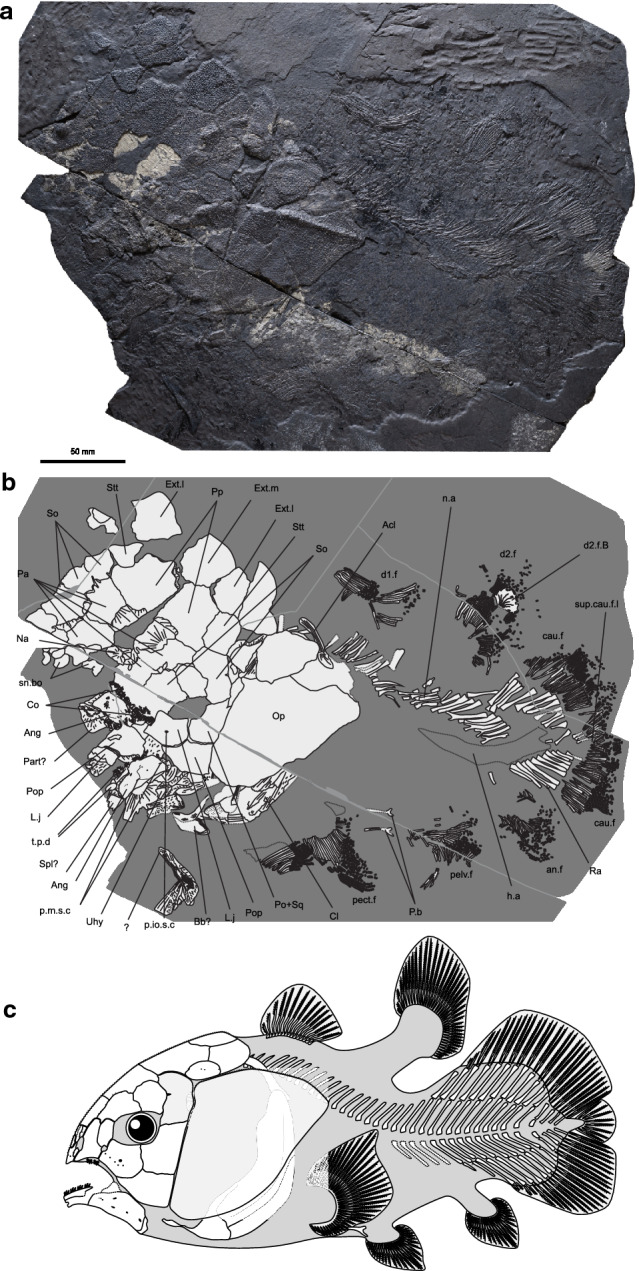
- Holotype specimen and skeletal reconstruction
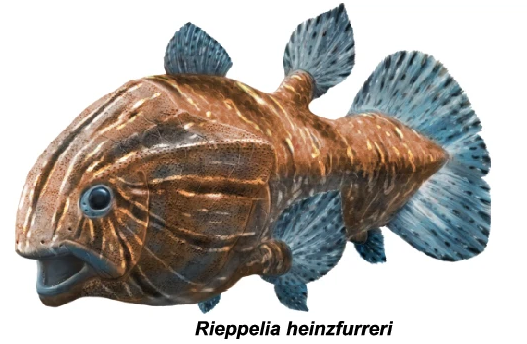
- Life restoration

Scientific classification
- Kingdom: Animalia
- Phylum: Chordata
- Class: Actinistia
- Order: Coelacanthiformes
- Suborder: Latimerioidei
- Family: Latimeriidae
- Genus: †Rieppelia; Ferrante and Cavin, 2023

Type species
- Rieppelia heinzfurreri (Ferrante and Cavin, 2023)

= Rieppelia =

Rieppelia Temporal range: Ladinian, 242.1 Ma

Extinct genus of coelacanths

Rieppelia is an extinct genus of latimeriid coelacanth fish from the Middle Triassic of Switzerland, in what is now Monte San Giorgio. It contains a single species, R. heinzfurreri.

== Naming ==
The generic name is given in honor of Dr. Olivier Rieppel, who was the first to report the presence of the taxon in the fossil fauna of San Giorgio. The species is named after Dr. Heinz Furrer, who made major contributions to the geological and paleontological research of Switzerland, especially the deposits of the Triassic period.

== Description ==
Rieppelia is an unusually short (63 cm) and stout coelacanth, akin to the closely related Foreyia. Its skull and fins had features reminiscing Paleozoic coelacanths, and a non-functional intracranial joint. Teeth were many, small, pointed and curved.

== Habitat ==
Rieppelia lived in shallow lagoons or basins at the western end of Paleo-Tethys Ocean, and along with related genera was probably an endemism.

== Classification ==
Rieppelia is a close relative of Triassic latimeriiids Foreyia and Ticinepomis, and together they are grouped in the subfamily Ticinepomiinae.

== See also ==
- Sarcopterygii
- List of sarcopterygians
- List of prehistoric bony fish
