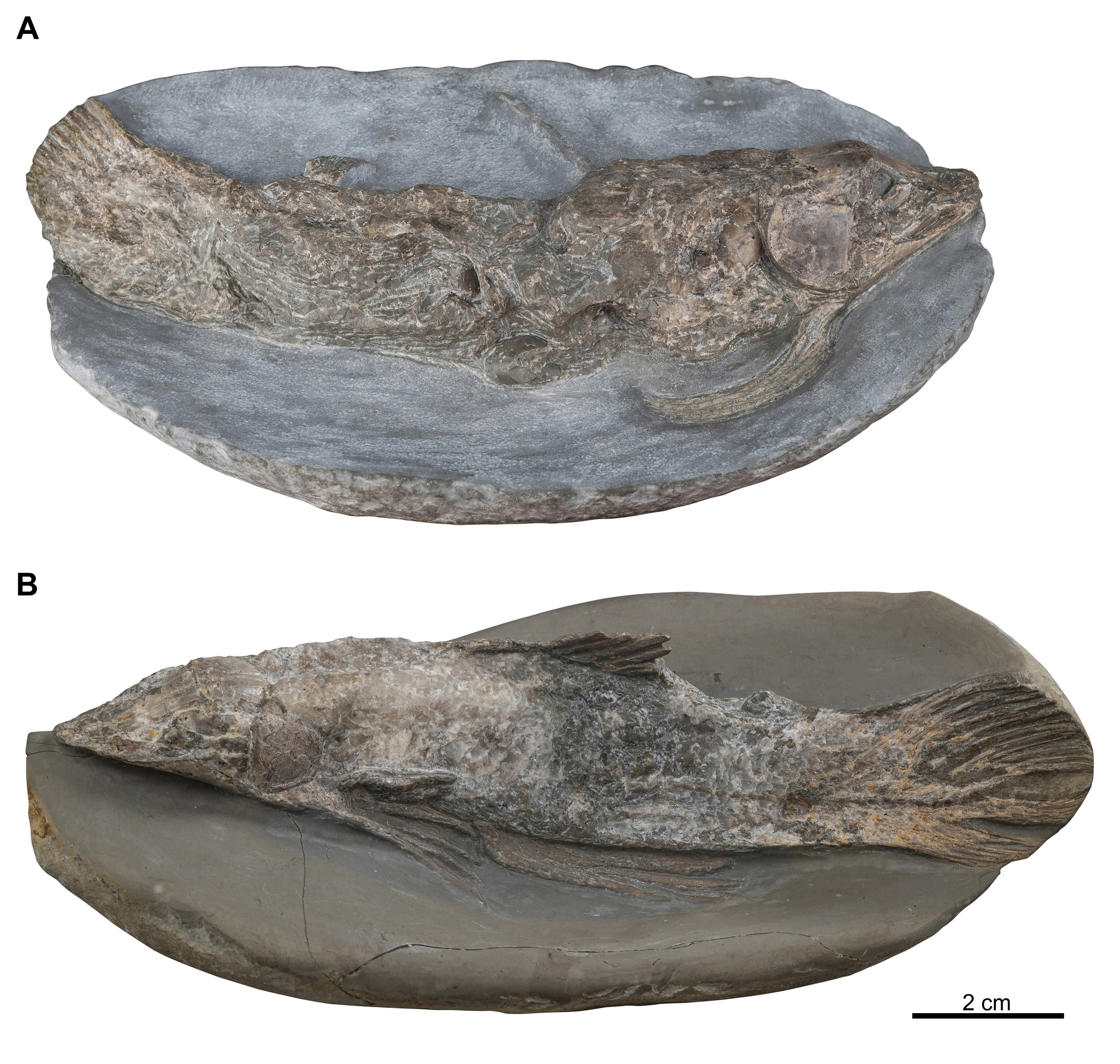
- Holotype (top) and referred (bottom) specimens

Scientific classification
- Kingdom: Animalia
- Phylum: Chordata
- Class: Actinistia
- Order: Coelacanthiformes
- Suborder: Latimerioidei
- Family: incertae sedis
- Genus: †Graulia; Manuelli et al., 2024
- Species: †G. branchiodonta

Binomial name
- †Graulia branchiodonta Manuelli et al., 2024

= Graulia =

Graulia Temporal range: Ladinian

Extinct genus of Triassic fish

Graulia is an extinct genus of lobe-finned fish from the Middle Triassic (Ladinian) of eastern France. It contains a single species, G. branchiodonta, and is represented by some of the most well preserved fossils of any Mesozoic coelacanth. Discovered in the Muschelkalk, two specimens are known, both of which are 16 cm long juveniles.

== Etymology ==
The genus name Graulia is a reference to Graoully, a mythical dragon from the folklore of Lorraine, France, where the specimens were found. The species name branchiodonta, comes from the Greek words βράγχια "gills" and ὀδούς, ὀδόντος "tooth", the latter which refers to the large teeth of the ceratobranchials.

== Description ==
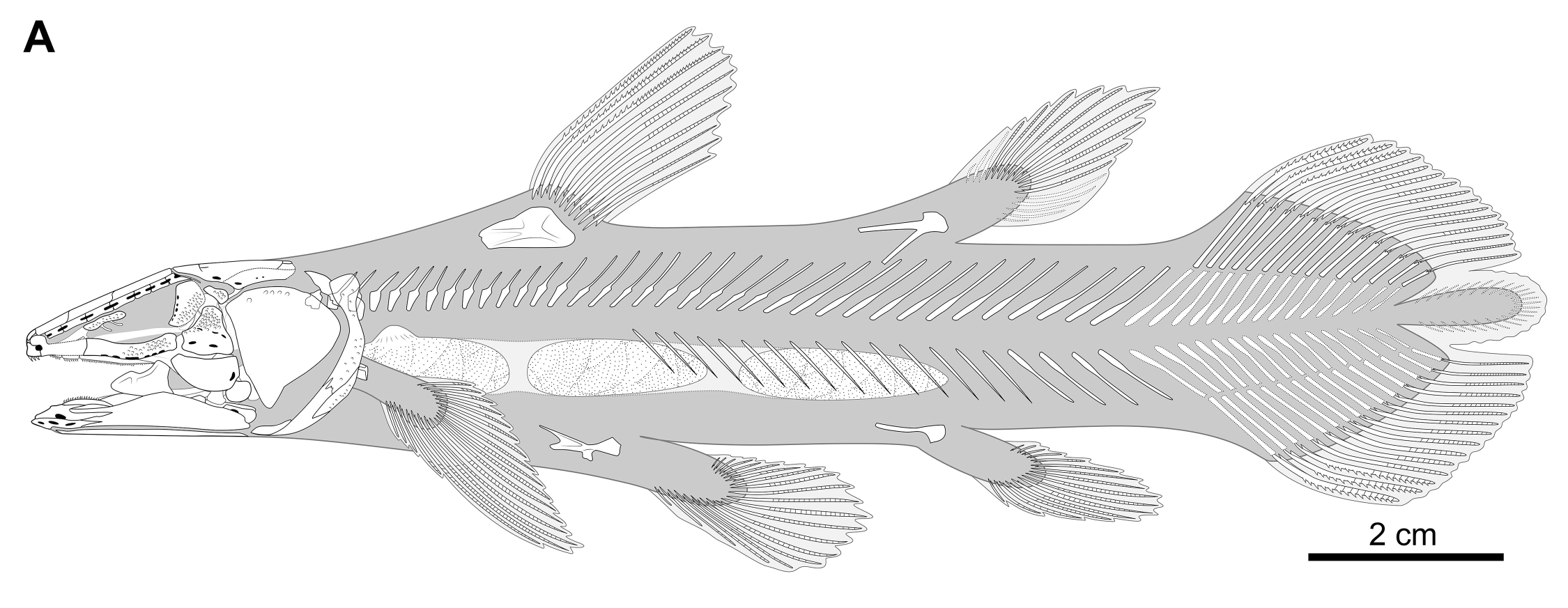
Skeletal reconstruction

Graulia had very small teeth in its jaws, but the ceratobranchials contained much larger teeth that would have functioned similarly to the gill rakers seen in ray-finned fish. As a result, Graulia is inferred to have been a suction feeder. Enlarged sensory canals in the skull suggest strong sensitivity to minimal water changes. This, in addition to the streamlined skull and relatively large fins, support that Graulia lived a highly active predatory lifestyle.

== Gallery ==
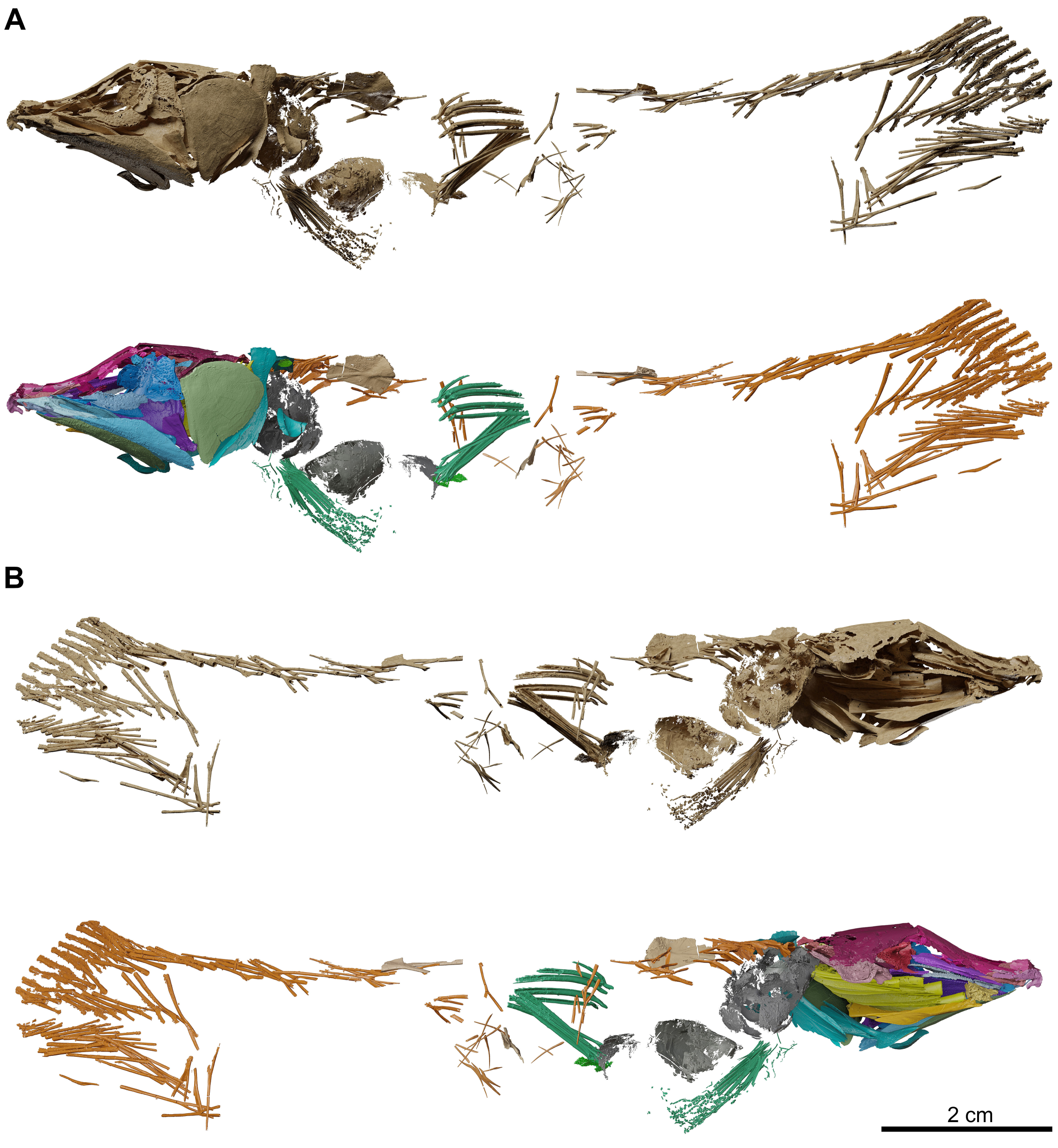
Micro CT scan of MHNG GEPI V5787 (holotype)

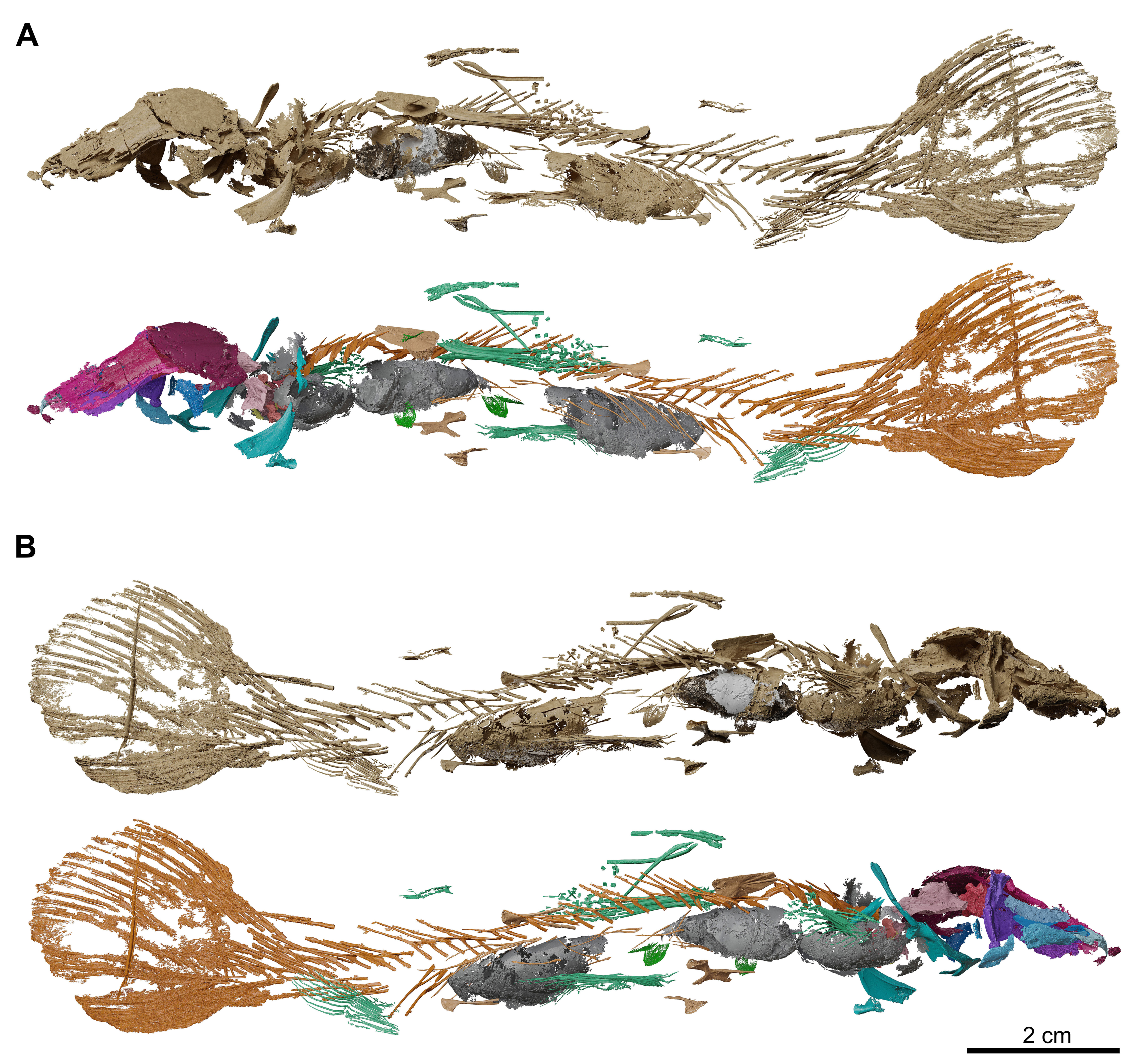
Micro CT scan of MHNG GEPI V5788 (referred)

Rotating virtual reconstruction of the skull

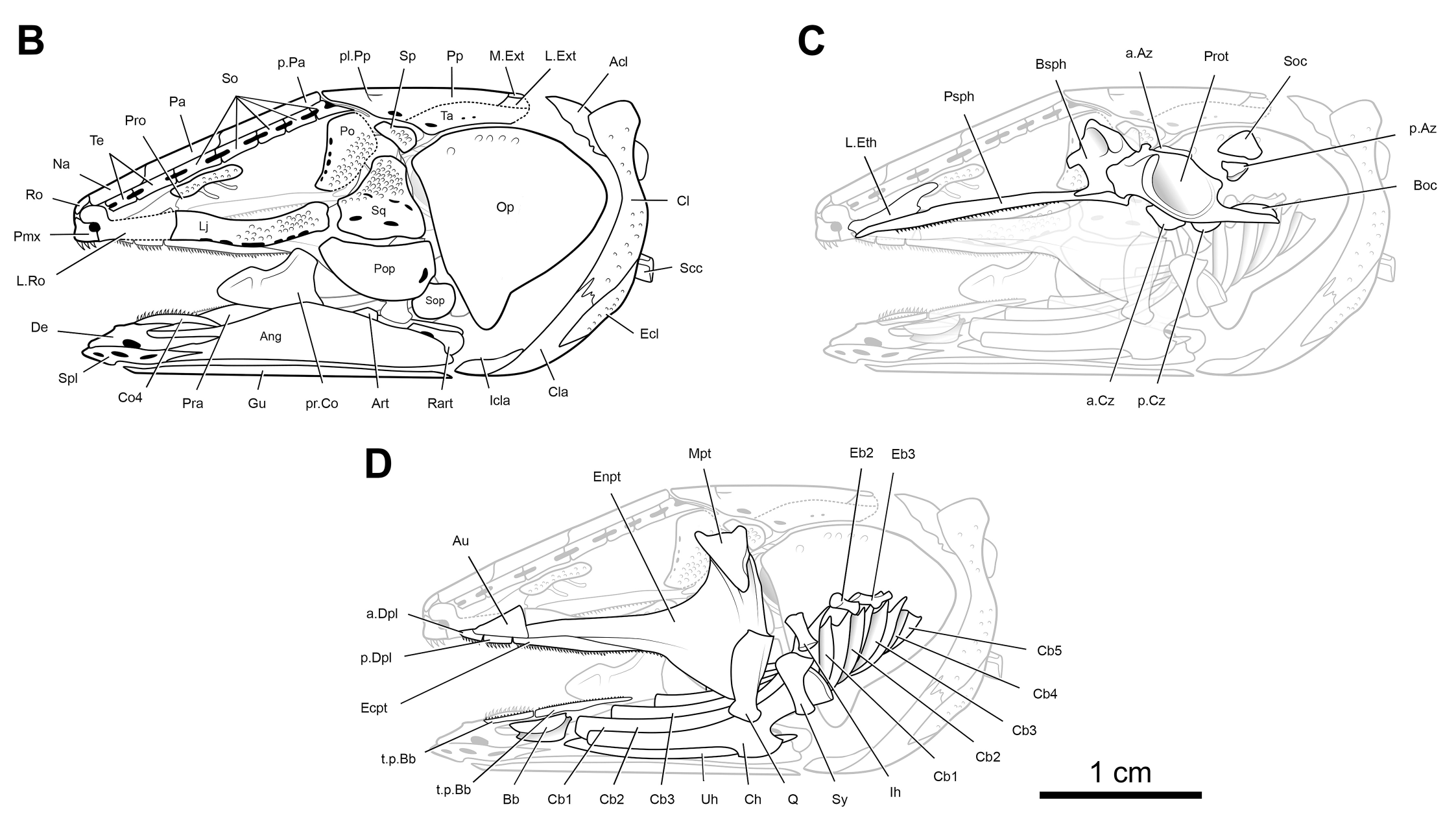
Skull diagram
