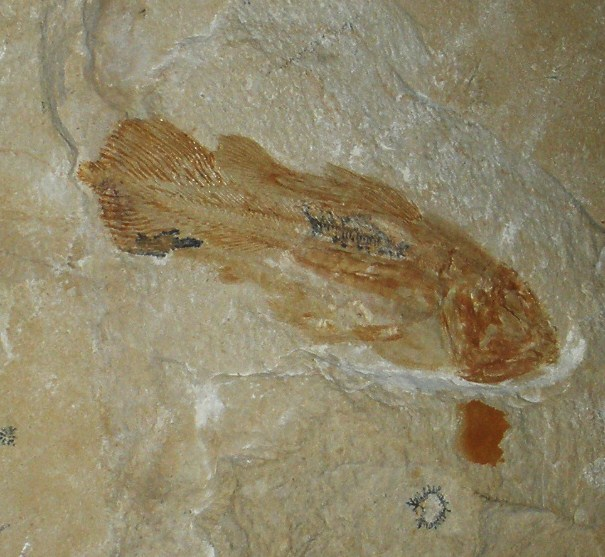
- Macropomoides orientalis from Lebanon

Scientific classification
- Kingdom: Animalia
- Phylum: Chordata
- Class: Actinistia
- Order: Coelacanthiformes
- Suborder: Latimerioidei
- Family: Latimeriidae
- Genus: †Macropomoides; Woodward, 1942

Type species
- †Macropomoides orientalis Woodward, 1942

= Macropomoides =

Macropomoides Temporal range: Cretaceous

Extinct genus of coelacanths

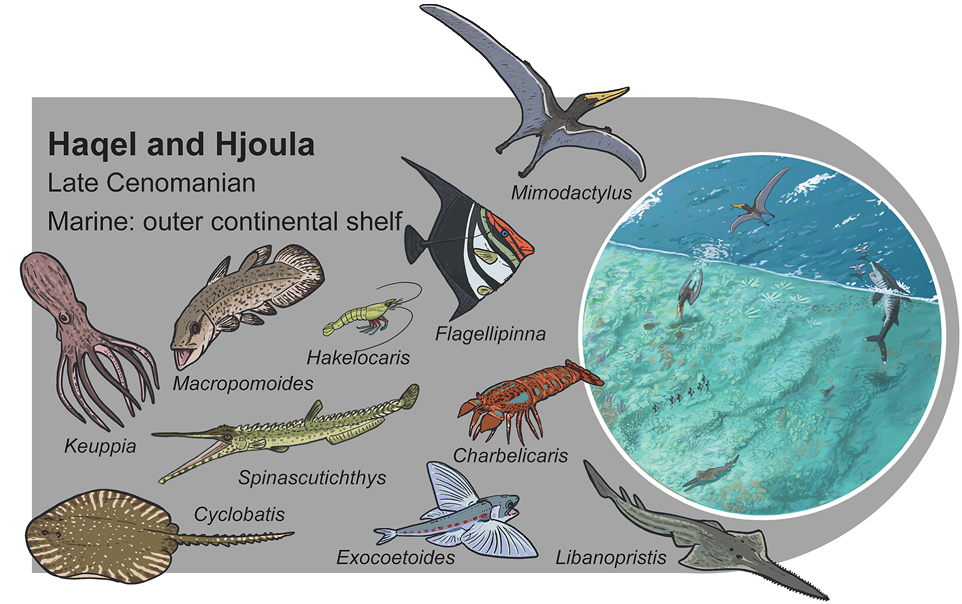
Fauna and depositional environment of the coeval Hakel and Hjoula localities, including Macropomoides

Macropomoides is an extinct genus of lobe-finned fish which lived during the Cretaceous period.
