= Swenzia =

Swenzia Temporal range: Upper Oxfordian
- Skull diagram

Scientific classification
- Kingdom: Animalia
- Phylum: Chordata
- Class: Actinistia
- Order: Coelacanthiformes
- Suborder: Latimerioidei
- Family: Latimeriidae
- Genus: †Swenzia; Clement, 2006

Type species
- Swenzia latimerae (Clement, 2005)

Synonyms
- Wenzia latimerae Clement, 2005

Extinct genus of coelacanths

Swenzia is an extinct genus of coelacanthid fish from the late Jurassic of France. It contains a single species, S. latimerae, which was originally described as Wenzia latimerae. Because the generic name Wenzia was already preoccupied by a snail, the generic name was amended to Swenzia. It is the fossil genus most closely related to the living coelacanth, Latimeria.

== See also ==
- Sarcopterygii
- List of sarcopterygians
- List of prehistoric bony fish
