= Holophagus =

Holophagus Temporal range: Early Jurassic (Sinemurian)
- Skull diagram of H. gulo

Scientific classification
- Kingdom: Animalia
- Phylum: Chordata
- Class: Actinistia
- Order: Coelacanthiformes
- Suborder: Latimerioidei
- Family: Latimeriidae
- Subfamily: Latimeriinae
- Genus: †Holophagus; Egerton, 1861
- Species: †H. gulo

Binomial name
- †Holophagus gulo Egerton, 1861

Extinct genus of coelacanths

Holophagus is an extinct genus of marine coelacanth belonging to the Latimeriidae. It contains a single species, H. gulo, known from the Early Jurassic (Sinemurian)-aged Blue Lias formation of England. Most authors now generally consider the genus restricted to the Lias of England.

== Taxonomy ==
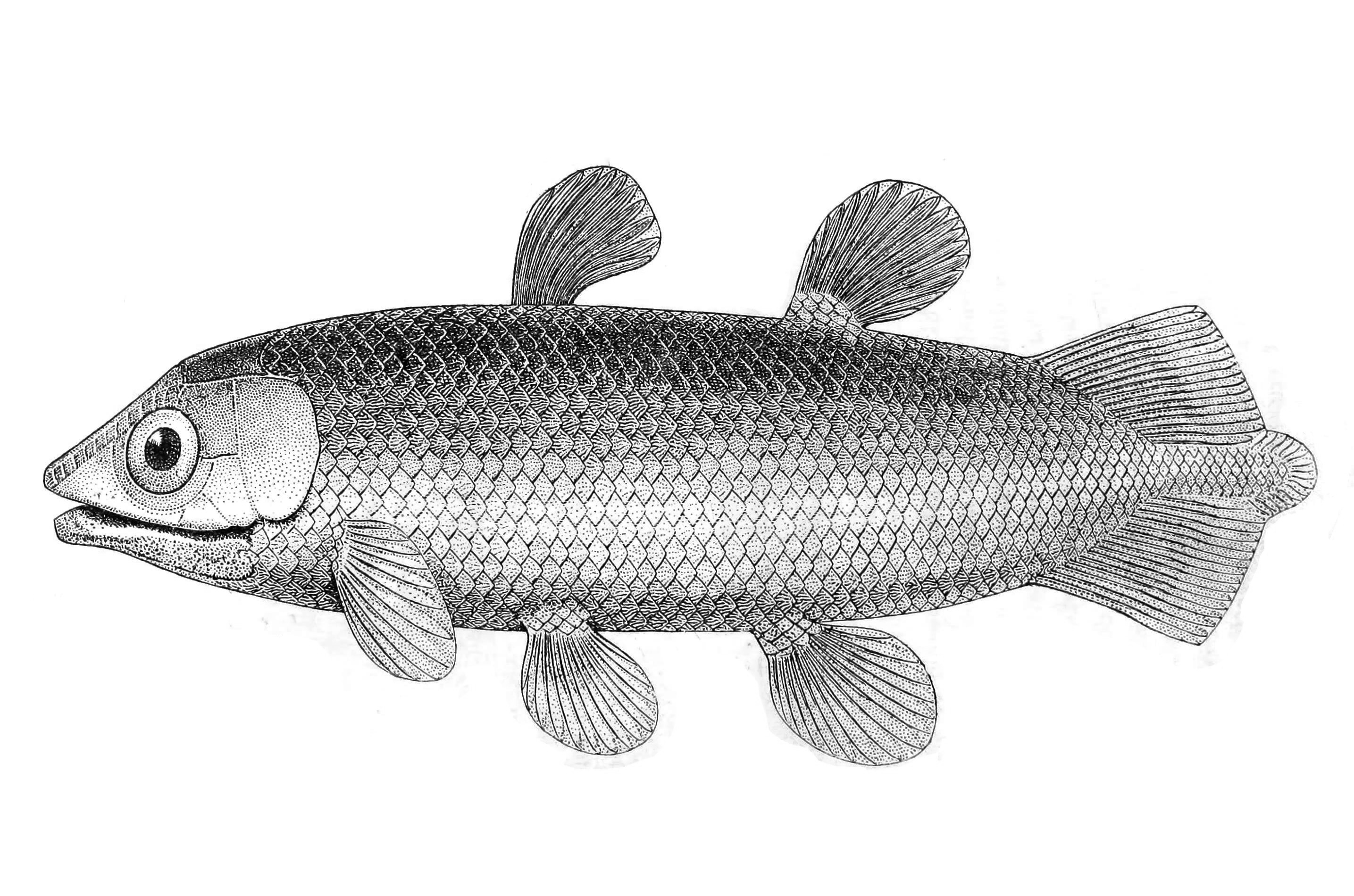
Life restoration of H. gulo from 1908

The species Holophagus penicillata/penicillatus from the Late Jurassic of Europe is now assigned to the genus Undina. The species Holophagus picenus from the Middle Triassic of Europe has also been reassigned by some authors to Undina. At least some specimens assigned to the genus from the Upper Jurassic of Germany actually belong to the genus Libys. The species Holophagus leridae from the Early Cretaceous El Montesec site in Spain, with other remains tenatively referred from the Early Cretaceous Las Hoyas locality also in Spain, probably do not belong in the genus, but have yet to be reassigned elsewhere.

Holophagus belongs to the Latimeriinae subfamily of Latimeriidae, making it rather closely related to the modern coelacanth Latimeria.
