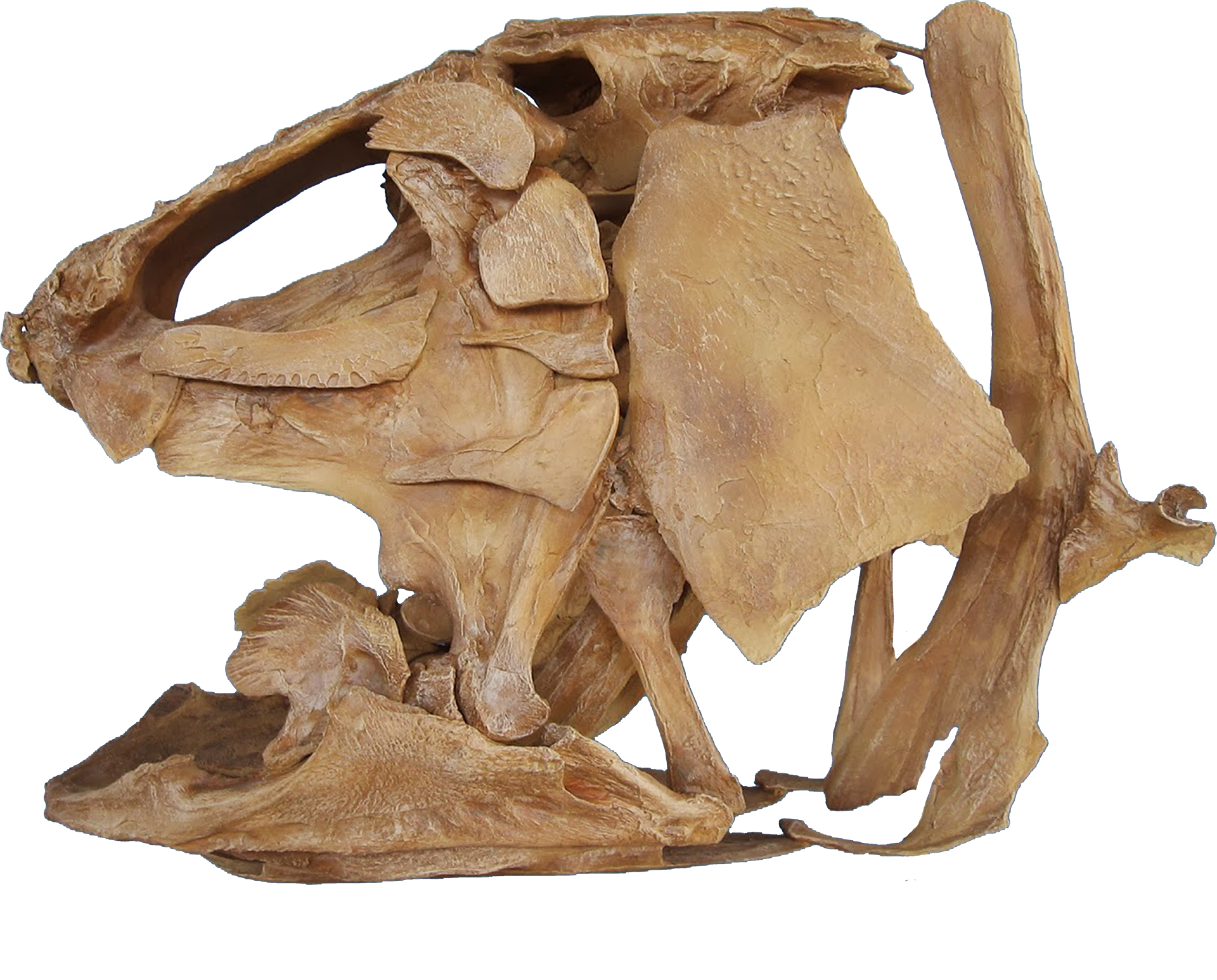
- Megalocoelacanthus dobiei mounted skull in the Rocky Mountain Dinosaur Resource Center in Woodland Park, Colorado
- Skull diagram in top-down view

Scientific classification
- Kingdom: Animalia
- Phylum: Chordata
- Class: Actinistia
- Order: Coelacanthiformes
- Suborder: Latimerioidei
- Family: Latimeriidae
- Genus: †Megalocoelacanthus; Schwimmer et al., 1994
- Species: †M. dobiei

Binomial name
- †Megalocoelacanthus dobiei Schwimmer et al., 1994

= Megalocoelacanthus =

Megalocoelacanthus Temporal range: Late Cretaceous, 87–66 Ma

Extinct genus of coelacanths

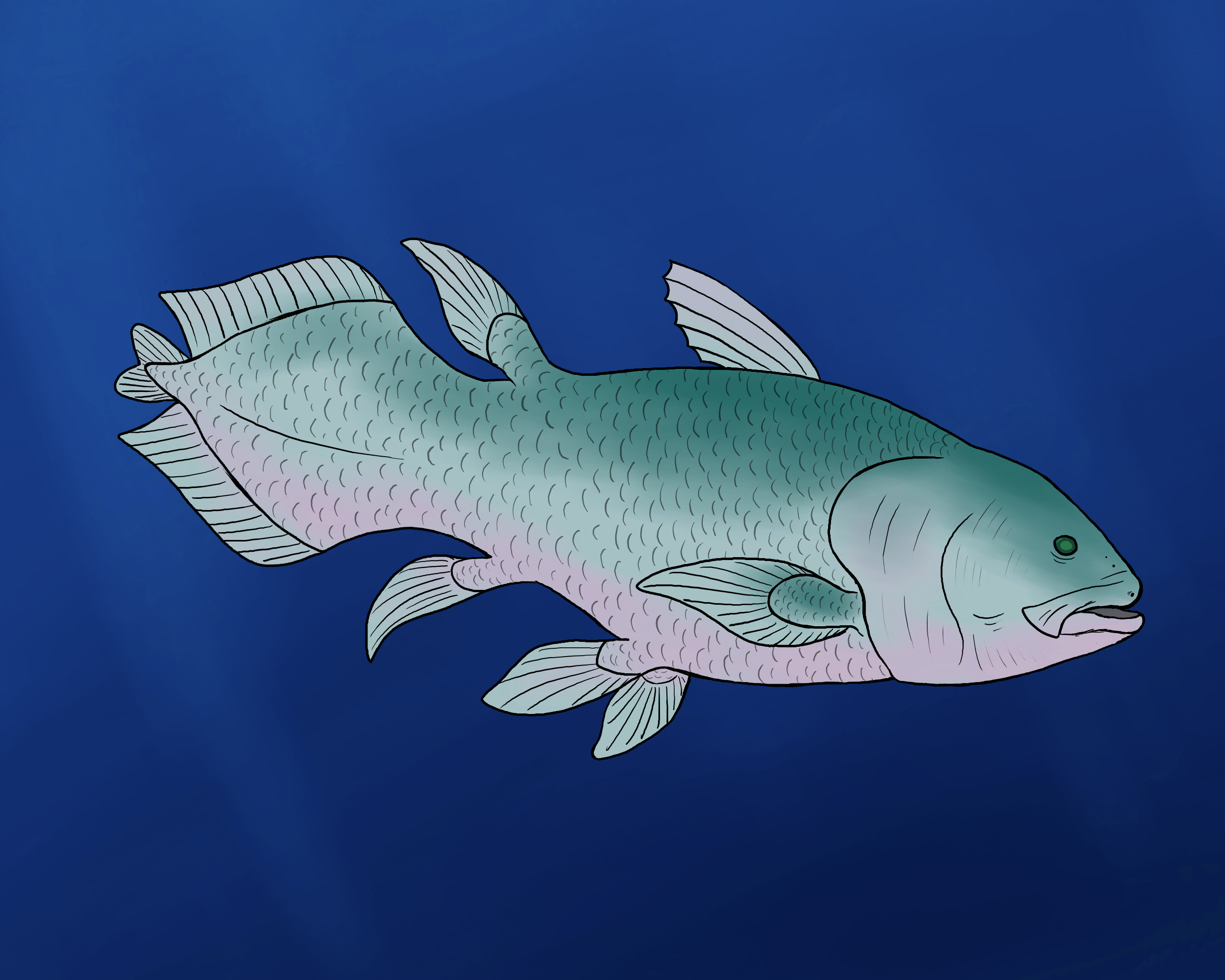
Life restoration

Megalocoelacanthus dobiei is an extinct species of giant latimeriid coelacanth lobe-finned fish which lived during the Lower Campanian epoch until possibly the early Maastrichtian in the Late Cretaceous period in Appalachia, the Western Interior Seaway and Mississippi Embayment. Its disarticulated remains have been recovered from the Eutaw Formation, Mooreville Chalk Formation, and Blufftown Formation of Alabama, Mississippi, and Georgia, and also from the Niobrara Formation of Kansas. Although no complete skeleton is known, careful examination of skeletal elements demonstrate it is closely related to the Jurassic-aged coelacanthid Libys. The species is named for herpetologist James L. Dobie. It has been estimated to have been 3.5–4.5 metres (11–15 ft) in length.
