= Graoully =

Dragon in the folklore of the French city Metz

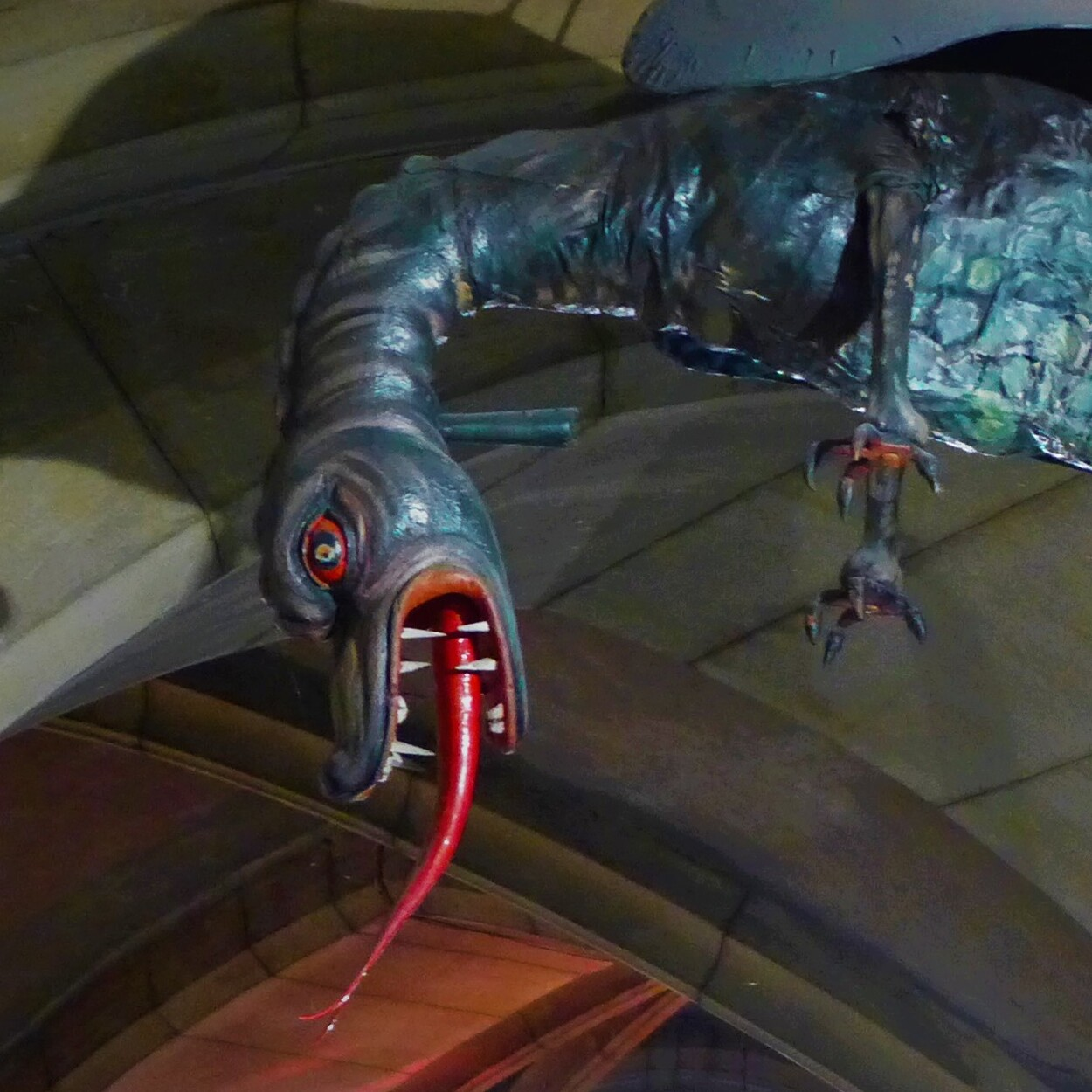
- 1864 reproduction of the Graoully-effigy using a head from the 15th century, preserved in the crypt of Saint-Etienne cathedral in Metz

Creature information
- Other name(s): Graouli, Graouilly, Graouilli, Graully
- Grouping: Legendary creature
- Sub grouping: Dragon
- Folklore: A dragon, living in the arena of the amphitheater of Metz; vanquished by Clement of Metz, the first bishop of the city.

Origin
- Country: France
- Details: Found in the arena of the Roman Amphitheatre

In French folklore, Graoully (spelled as Graouli, Graouilly, Graouille or Graully) is a creature with the appearance of a dragon. According to legend, it lived in the arena of the Roman amphitheater in Metz, France. Legends state that Saint Clement of Metz fought against Graoully and vanquished the beast.

== Etymology ==
It is believed that the word Graoully derives from the French word "grouiller" meaning "swarm". This has been attributed to the myth that the dragon and the large serpents were like a swarm in the amphitheater. Other origins suggested for the name include the German word "gräulich", which can mean "grayish" or "horrible". The closest English synonym it has is "gruesome" or "macabre". It has been proposed that the word "graula" may have been the origin of the name. It was commonly used in fourteenth century French as a synonym for raven, especially when used to describe ravens as a bad omen.

== Legend ==
Le Graoully and a large number of smaller serpents (compare Germanic dragon) rampaged in the ruins of a Roman amphitheater. Their attery breath poisoned the surroundings and terrified the city's population. Saint Clément was sent to spread the gospel and promised to help the inhabitants in exchange for them abandoning their pagan beliefs of their "false gods". The bishop went to the serpents pit, held up his cross and captured Le Graoully with his stole – the long wide band worn over the shoulders. He then led the dragon away and made sure it disappeared over the Seille River along with the rest of the serpents. A feat that caused the population to convert to Christianity.

However, in many depictions and versions of the story, Saint Clément instead slew the dragon by piercing it with a polearm.

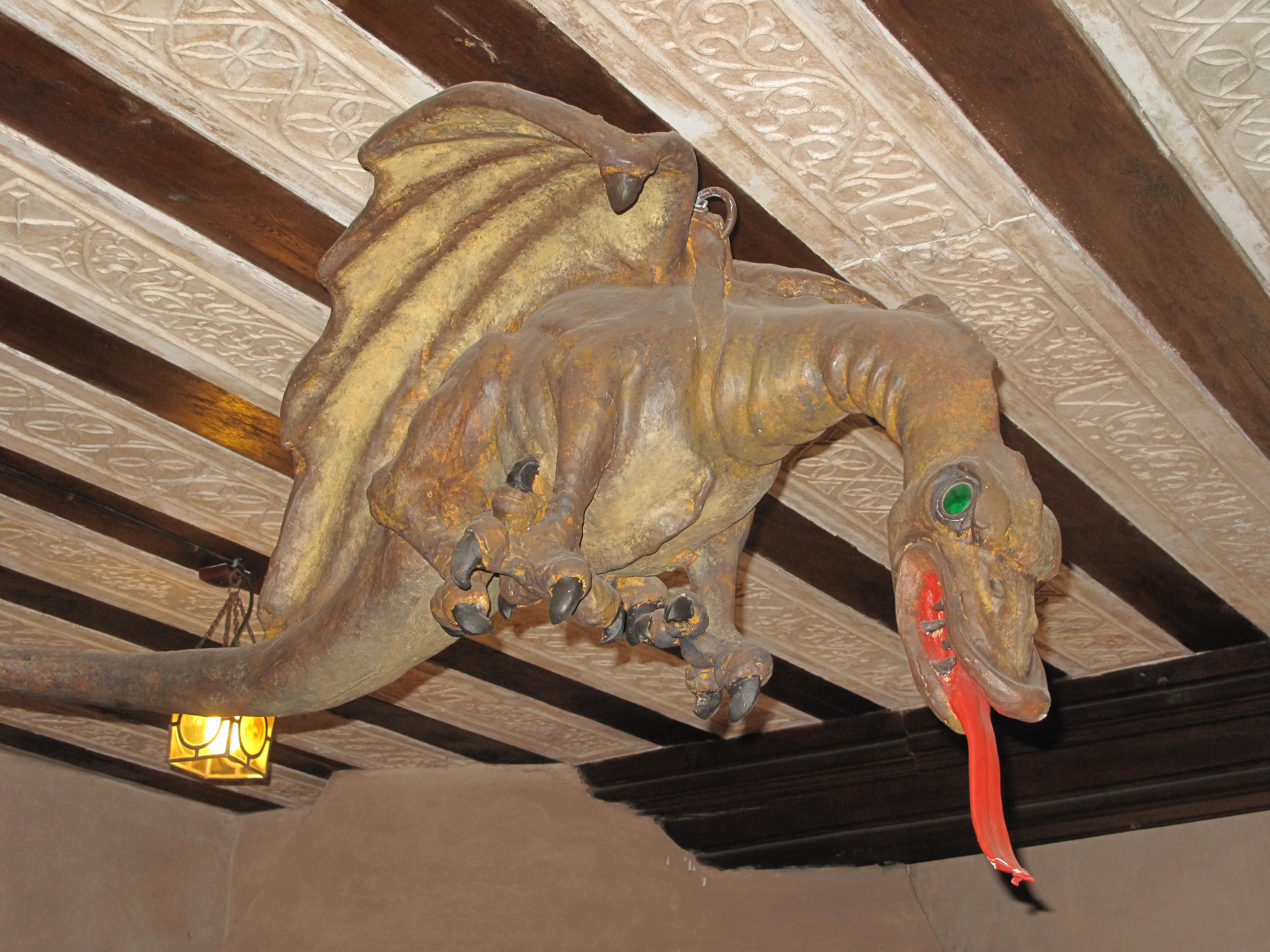
Model of Graoully (copy of effigy) at the castle of Haut-Koenigsbourg (Bas-Rhin, France)

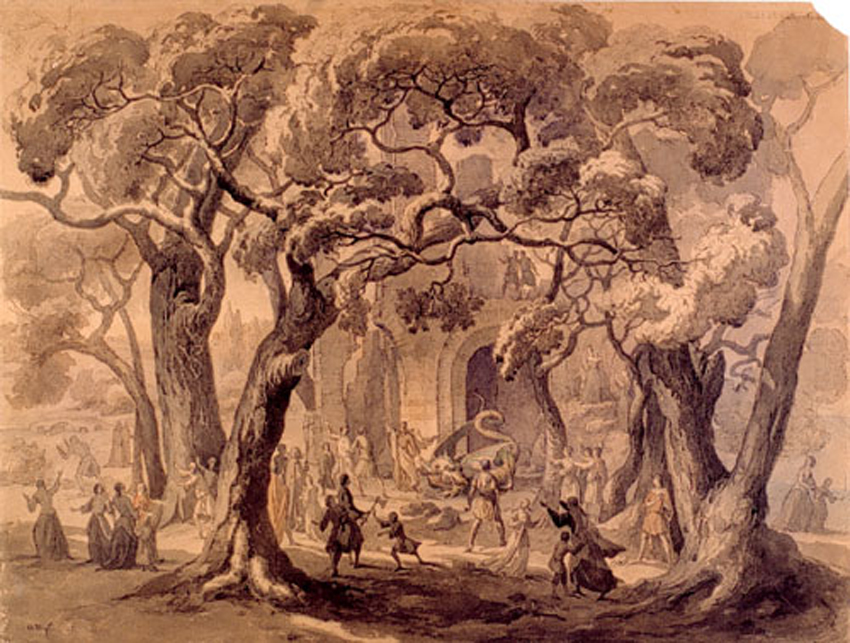
Representation of Saint Clement fighting the Graoully dragon in Metz's Roman amphitheater

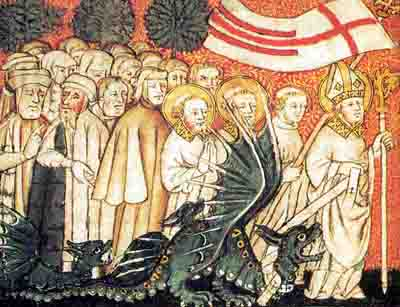
Saint Clément, first bishop of Metz, leads the Graoully on the banks of the Seille

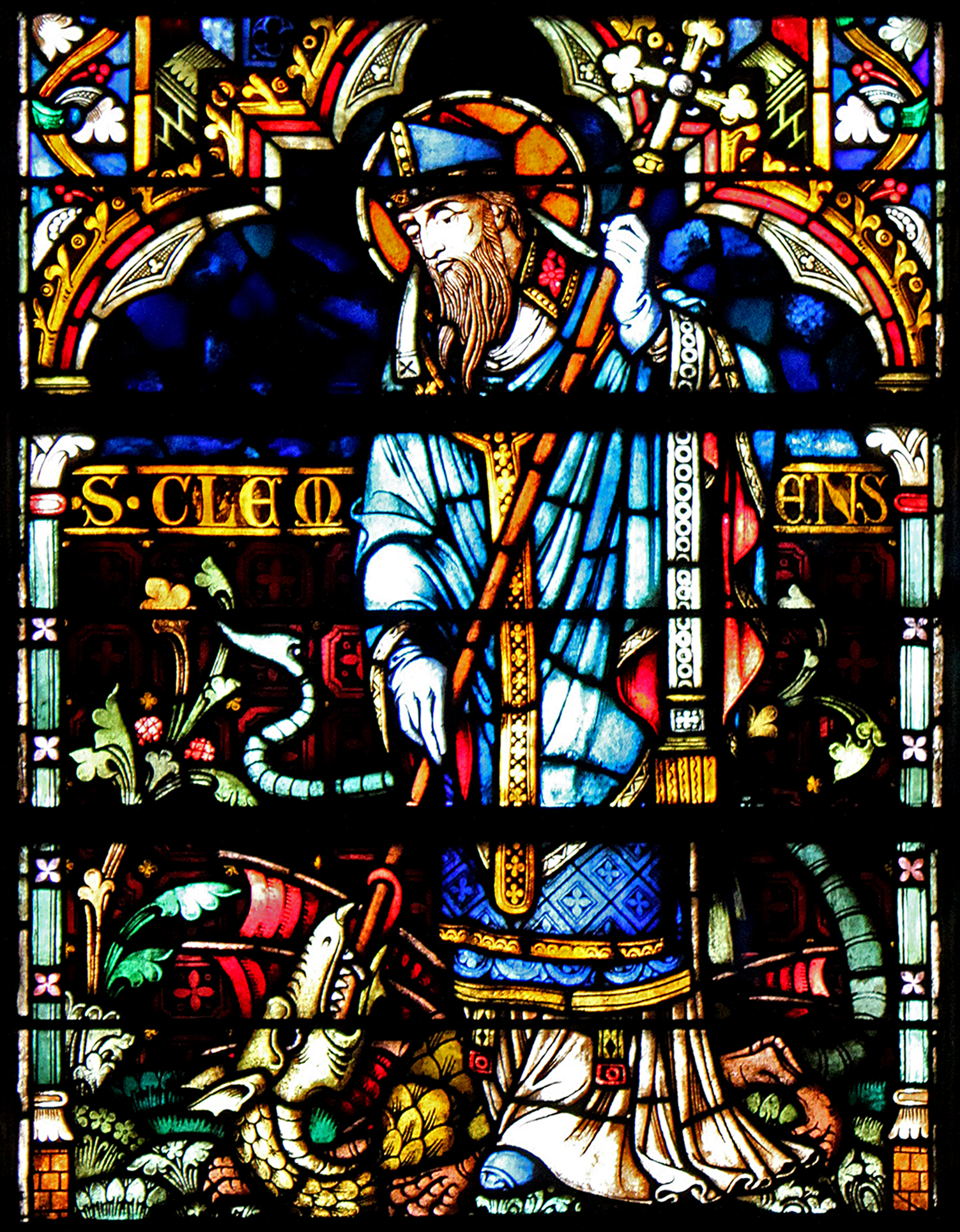
Glass painting of Saint Clément piercing Graoully in the Metz Cathedral

== Cultural representation ==
The legend of St. Clement inspired several other legends of dragonslayer Saints. Meanwhile Graoully became a symbol of Metz and remains one of the major symbols used by a number of major establishments in the city. Graoully was also used in the local Oscan Games from the twelfth century until the start of the French Revolution.

=== Procession of Graoully ===
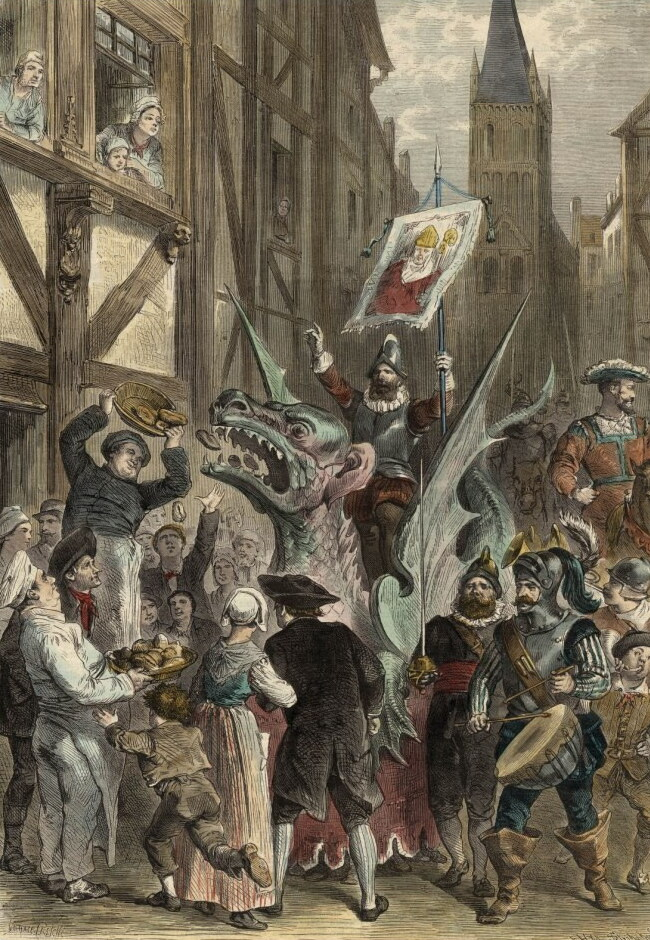
The Graoully of Metz, Horace Castelli, oil on canvas, 1872

A procession with an effigy of the dragon was held in the city until the nineteenth century. The practice started in the eleventh century when three banners were carried in the procession of Saint Mark during Rogation days. One of these depicted a dragon's head. During the following century, an effigy of the dragon was constructed and paraded along with the banner. Later on a huge Graoully effigy was used instead of the banners. The French Renaissance writer François Rabelais described the Graoully's effigy during a procession of the sixteenth century:

It was a monstrous, hideous effigy, terrifying for small children, with eyes bigger than the stomach, and a head bigger than the rest of the body, with horrific, wide jaws and lots of teeth which were made to clash by the use of a cord, making terrible noises as if the dragon of Saint Clement was actually in Metz.

— François Rabelais, The Fourth Book

The construction of the effigy continued to evolve and in the 18th century, it was constructed as a canvas figure filled with hay and twelve feet high. The jaws did not move, and the forked tongue ended with points of iron. Every baker in front of whom the procession passed, picked up a half-pound white bun and gave it to the bearer of the dragon.

=== Symbolic representation ===
On the coat of arms of Sablon (neighborhood on which the amphitheater was located and where the dragon is said to have been slain), appears the heraldic representation of Graoully, pierced with the cross of Saint Clement

A number of writers have stated that the legend of the Graoully is a symbol of Christianity's victory over paganism, with Saint Clement representing religion and paganism represented by the harmful dragon.

The oldest known sculpture to date is located at 10 rue Chêvremont, on the maison du serpent, stemming from the 13th century. There is also a representation of Graoully on a house in the rue de la Marne in Sarrebourg and in a room in the Château du Haut-Kœnigsbourg. A depiction of Graoully from the 16th century is in the crypt in the cathedral of the Saint-Etienne. Another sculpture is suspended in mid-air on Taison street, near the cathedral. The name of the Rue Taison is traced back to a warning from the Graoully: "Taisons, taisons nous, voilà le Graoully qui passe" (Be silent, here is the Graoully passing by). Supposedly Saint Clement had uttered spoken the words "taisons-nous" on his entry into the city. The Groully is also featured on the coats of arms of FC Metz.

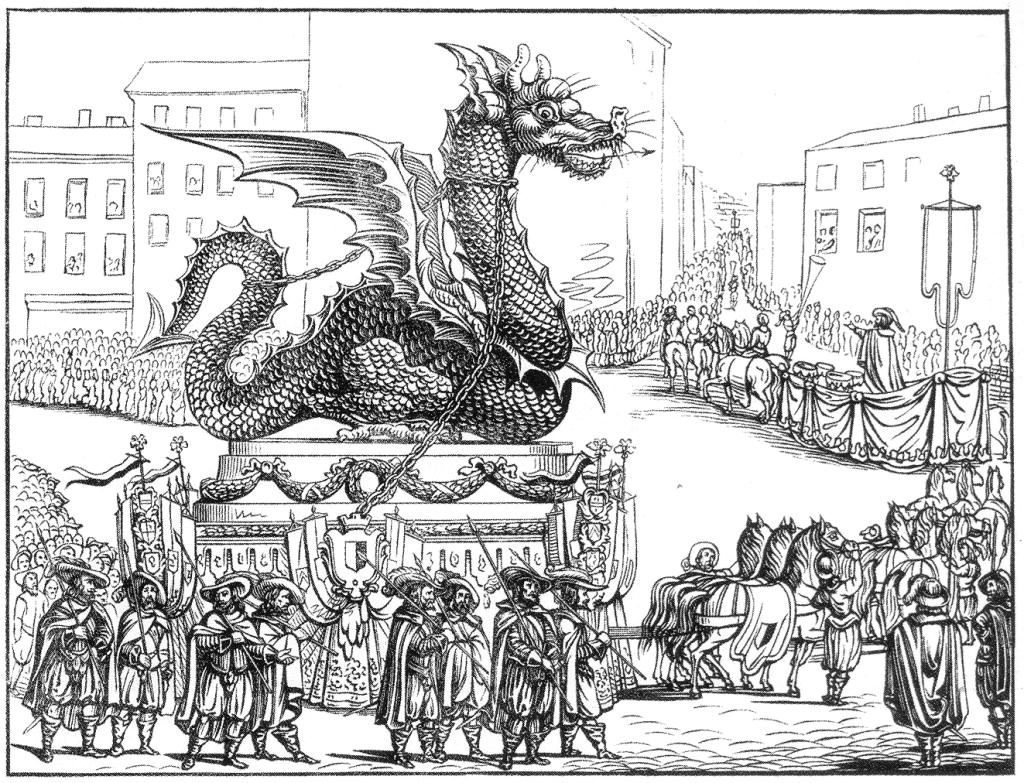
The "Graoully" of Metz, poster of 1850, now exhibited at the Museum of Metz

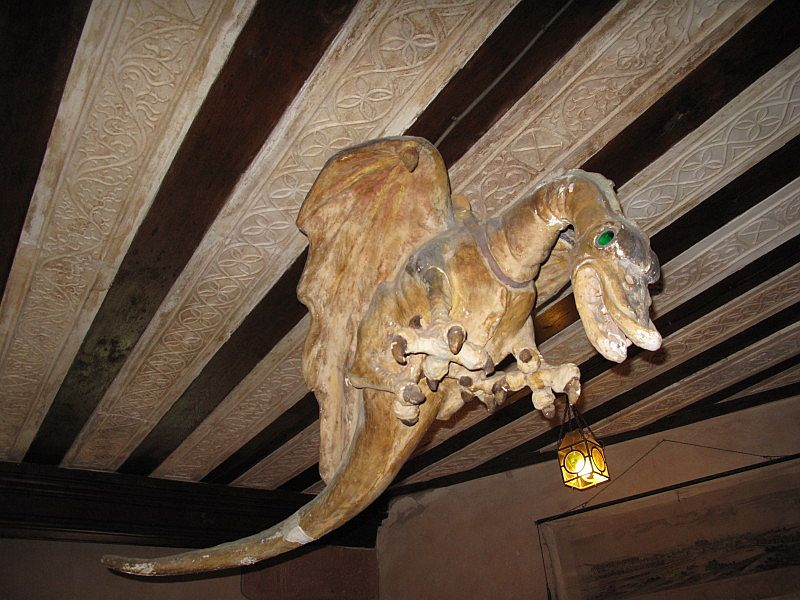
Copy of the effigy of the Graoully in the Lorraine room in the castle of Haut-Koenigsbourg (Bas-Rhin, France)

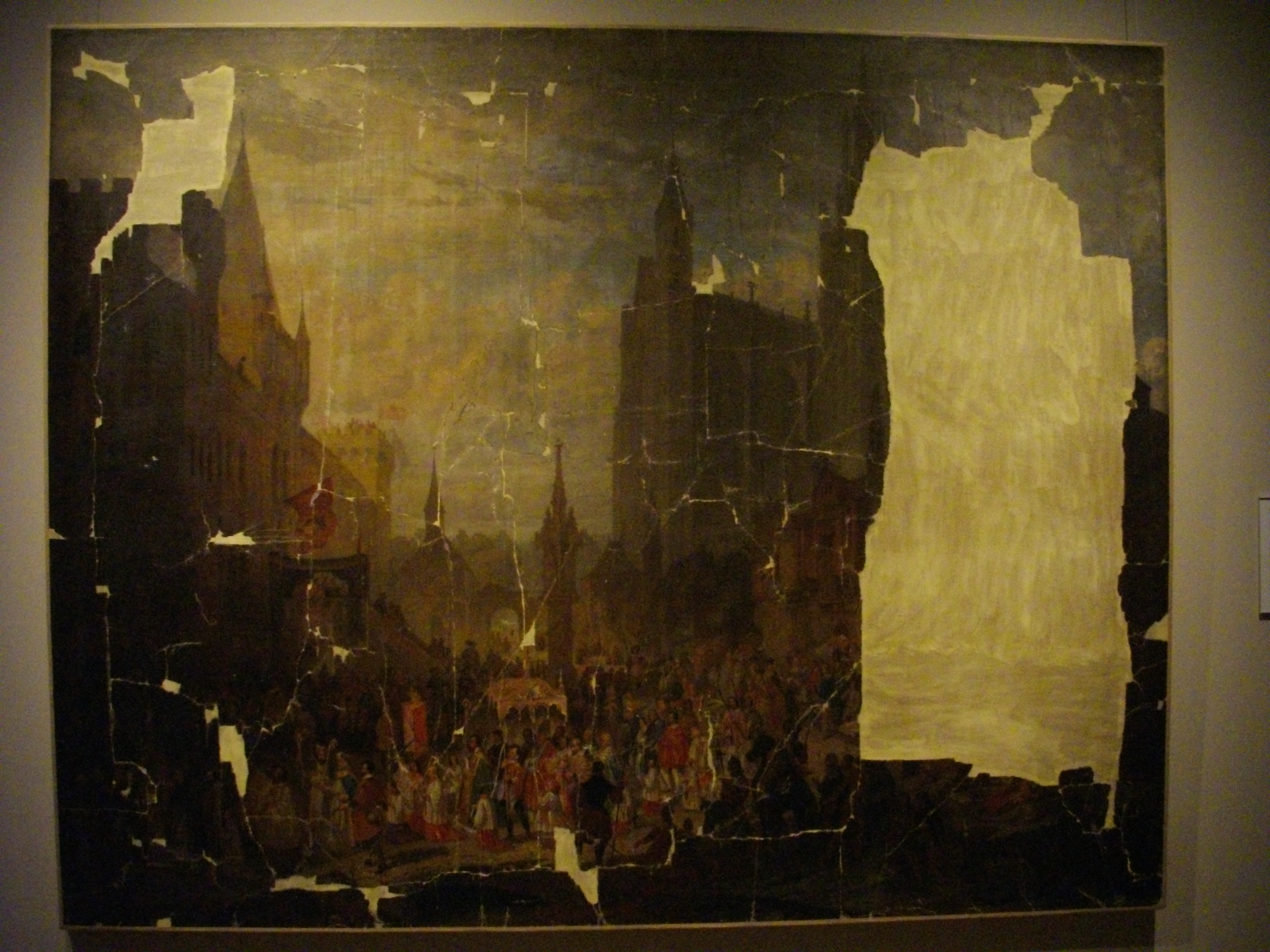
Graoully, procession of Saint Marc, 1631, Auguste Migette, 1846, kept in Cour d'Or museums

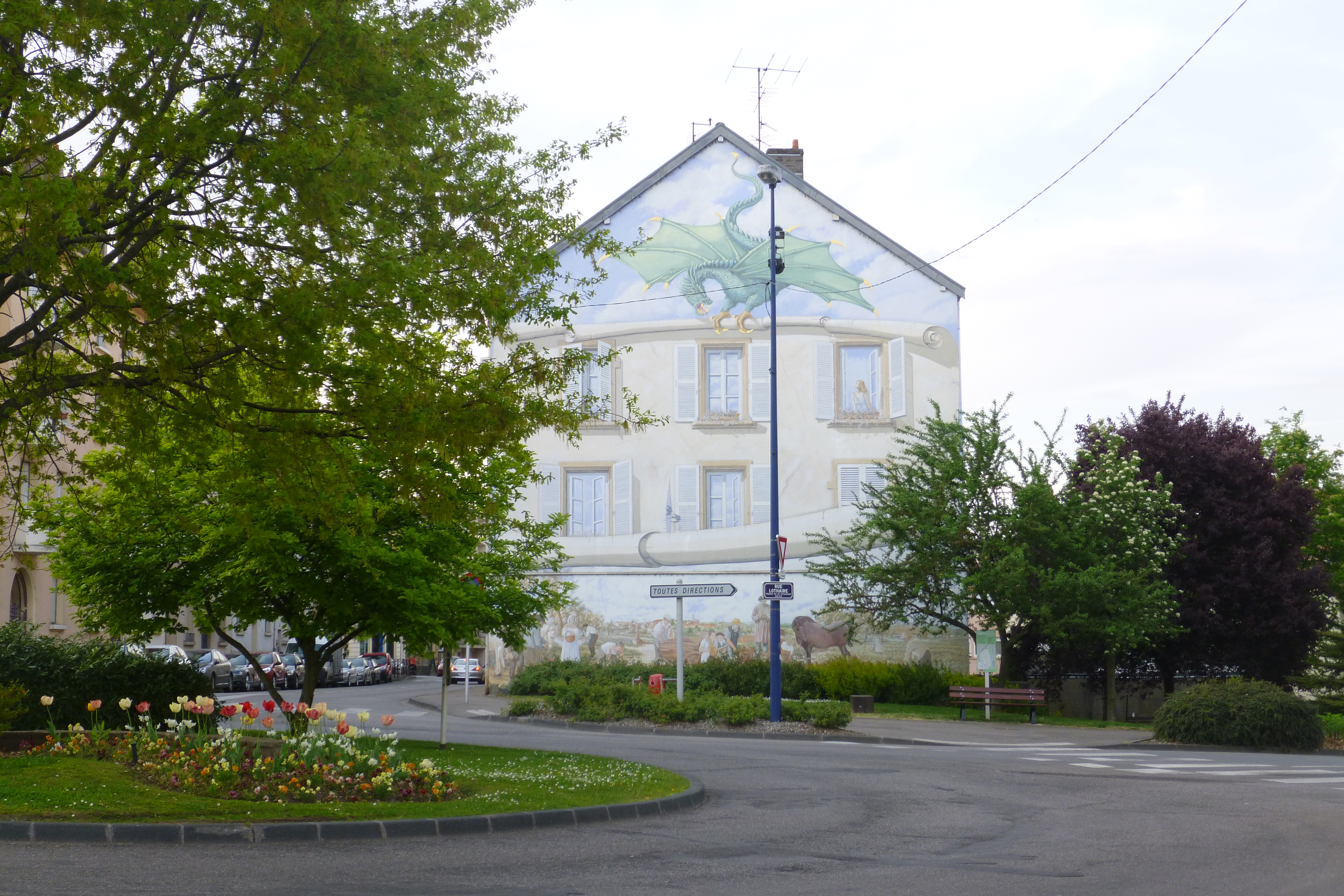
Fresco of Graoully in Sablon, Metz

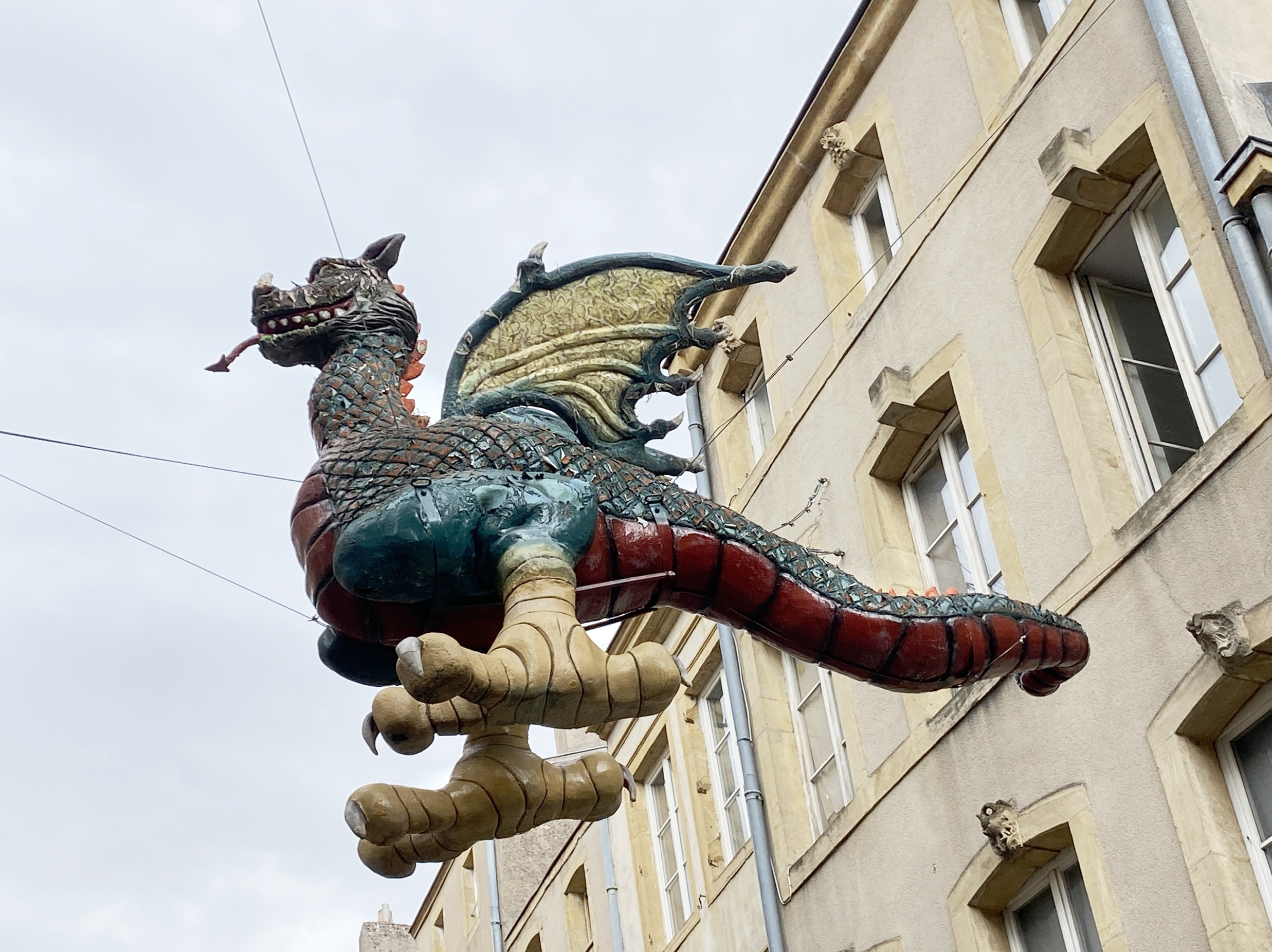
Model of Graoully hung between buildings in Metz
