= Macropoma =

Macropoma Temporal range: Cretaceous Albian–Turonian
- Skull diagram of Macropoma lewesiensis

Scientific classification
- Kingdom: Animalia
- Phylum: Chordata
- Class: Actinistia
- Order: Coelacanthiformes
- Suborder: Latimerioidei
- Family: Latimeriidae
- Genus: †Macropoma; Agassiz, 1835

Extinct genus of coelacanths

Macropoma (from Greek μακρός "large" + πόμα "cover", after its large operculum) is an extinct genus of coelacanth in the class Sarcopterygii. Fossils of Macropoma have been found in both England and Czech Republic, dating to the mid-Cretaceous (Albian-Turonian). Recorded fossils have bodies under two feet in length. A modern coelacanth measures five or more, but in other respects the two genera are remarkably similar, and share the same body plan with a three-lobed tail and stalked fins.

Macropoma grew to a length of 19-23 inches (50-60 centimeters) and would have preyed upon smaller aquatic species.
