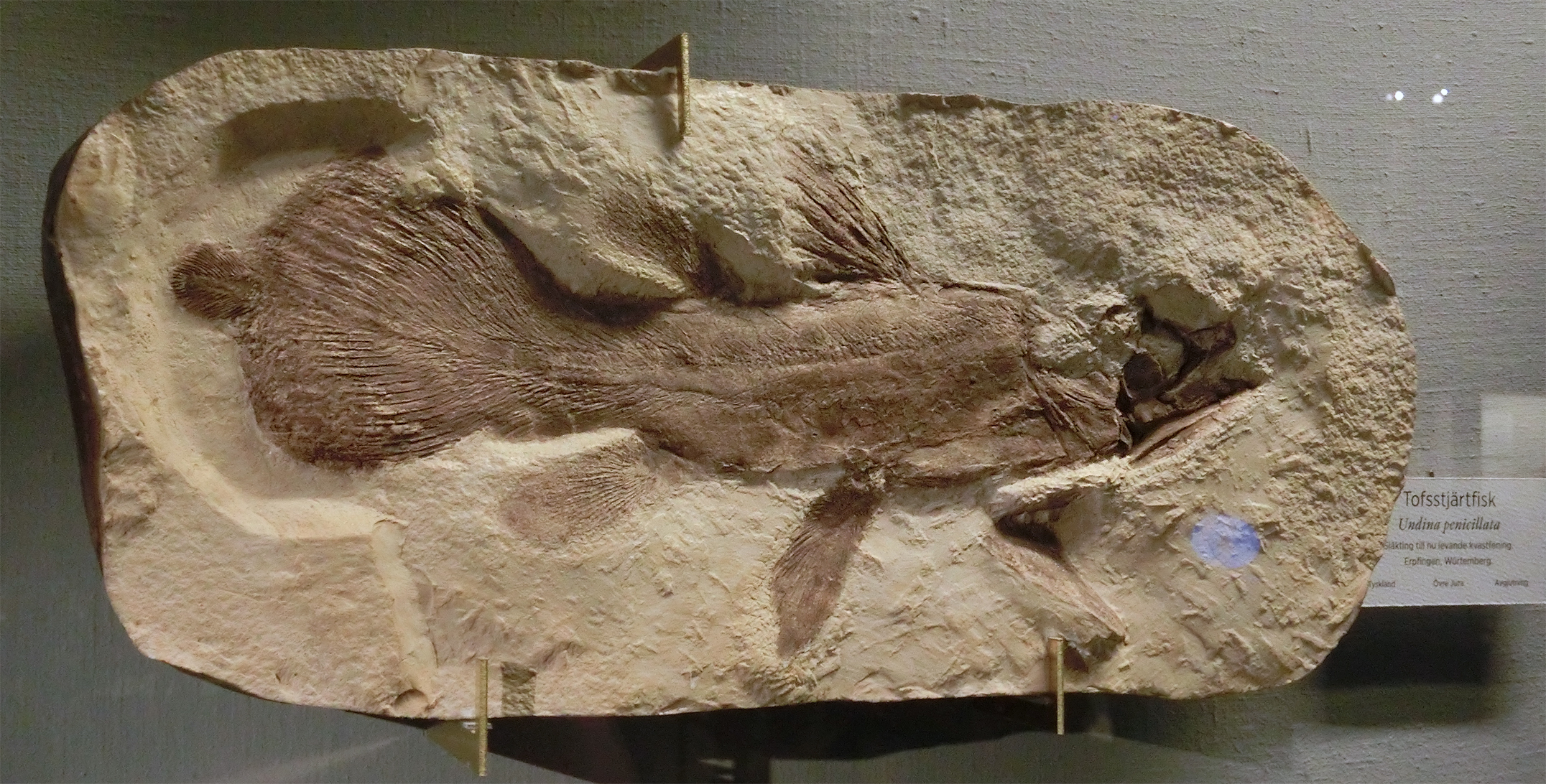
- Undina penicillata, at Göteborgs Naturhistoriska Museum

Scientific classification
- Kingdom: Animalia
- Phylum: Chordata
- Class: Actinistia
- Order: Coelacanthiformes
- Suborder: Latimerioidei
- Family: Latimeriidae
- Genus: †Undina; Münster, 1834

Synonyms
- †Holophagus Egerton 1861

= Undina (fish) =

Undina Temporal range: Triassic-Cretaceous 251.9–66.0 Ma

Extinct genus of coelacanths

Undina is a genus of prehistoric coelacanth, lobe-finned fish, which lived from the Triassic period to the Cretaceous period (Only ranges Sinemurian to Tithonian according to 2021 study).

== Species ==
- Undina acutidens Reis, 1888
- Undina barroviensis
- Undina gulo (synonym: Holophagus gulo) (type species)
- Undina penicillata (Munster)
- Undina? picena (Costa, 1862)
- Undina purbeckensis

== Distribution ==
Species of this genus have been found in Cretaceous of Spain, in Jurassic of Germany, Turkey and the United Kingdom and in Triassic of Italy.

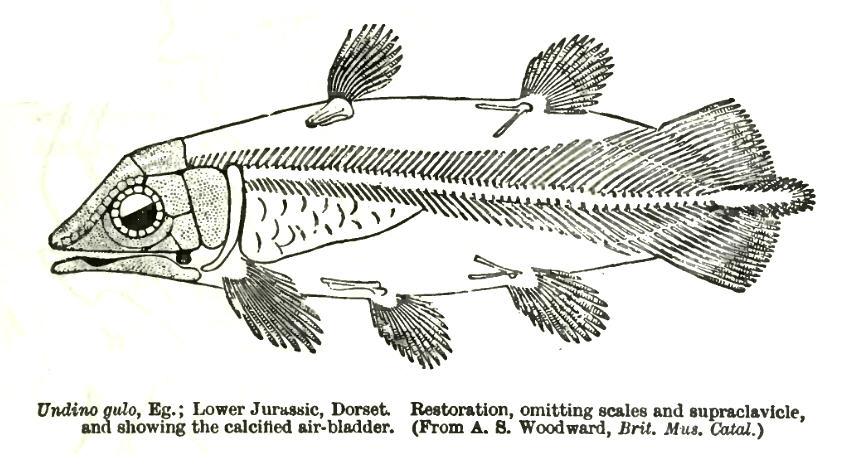
Restoration of Undina gulo

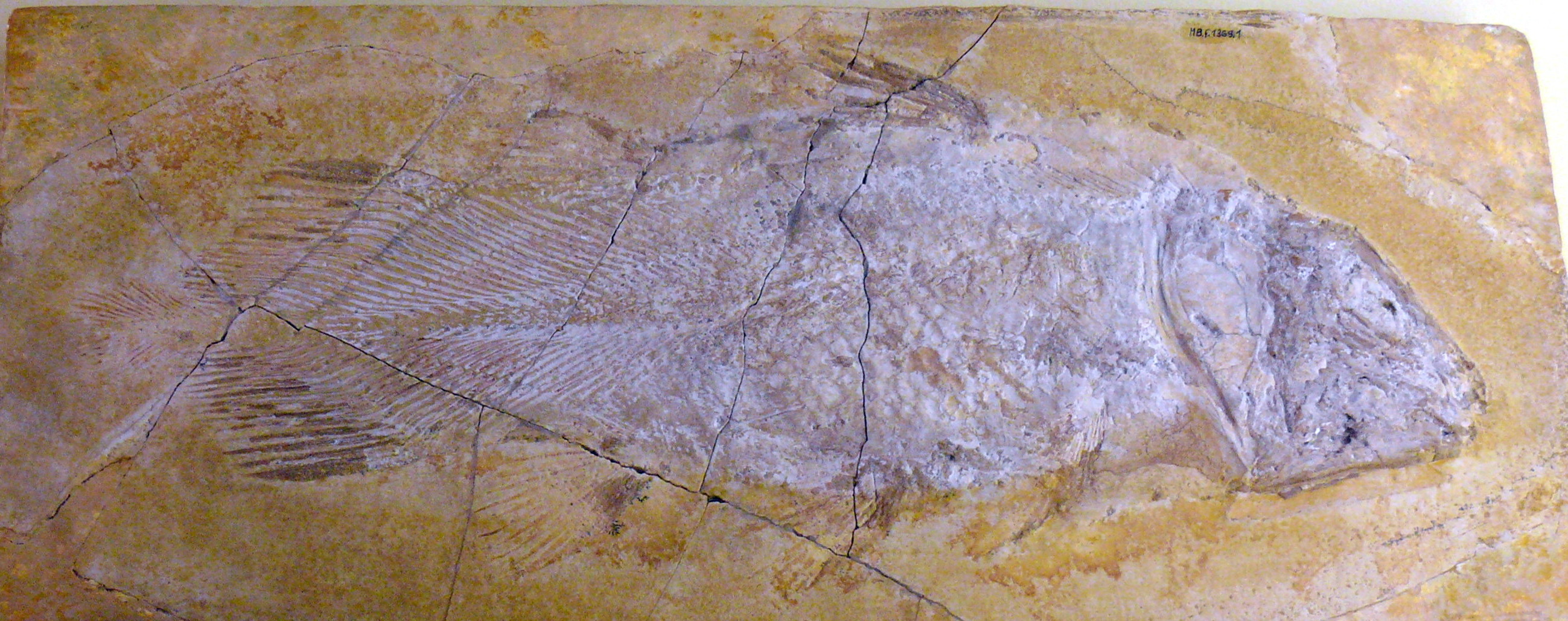
Undina penicillata

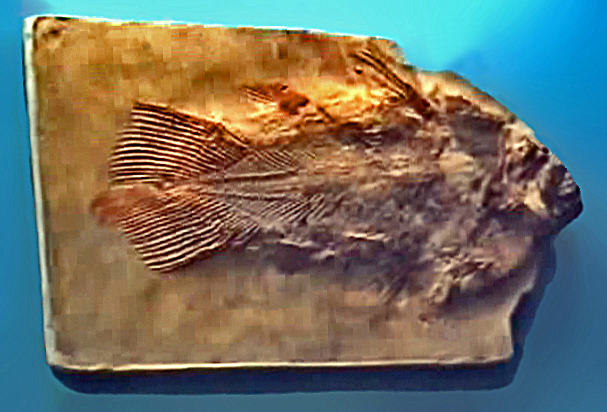
Undina acutidens, abt. 25 cm long, at the Naturhistorisches Museum, Wien

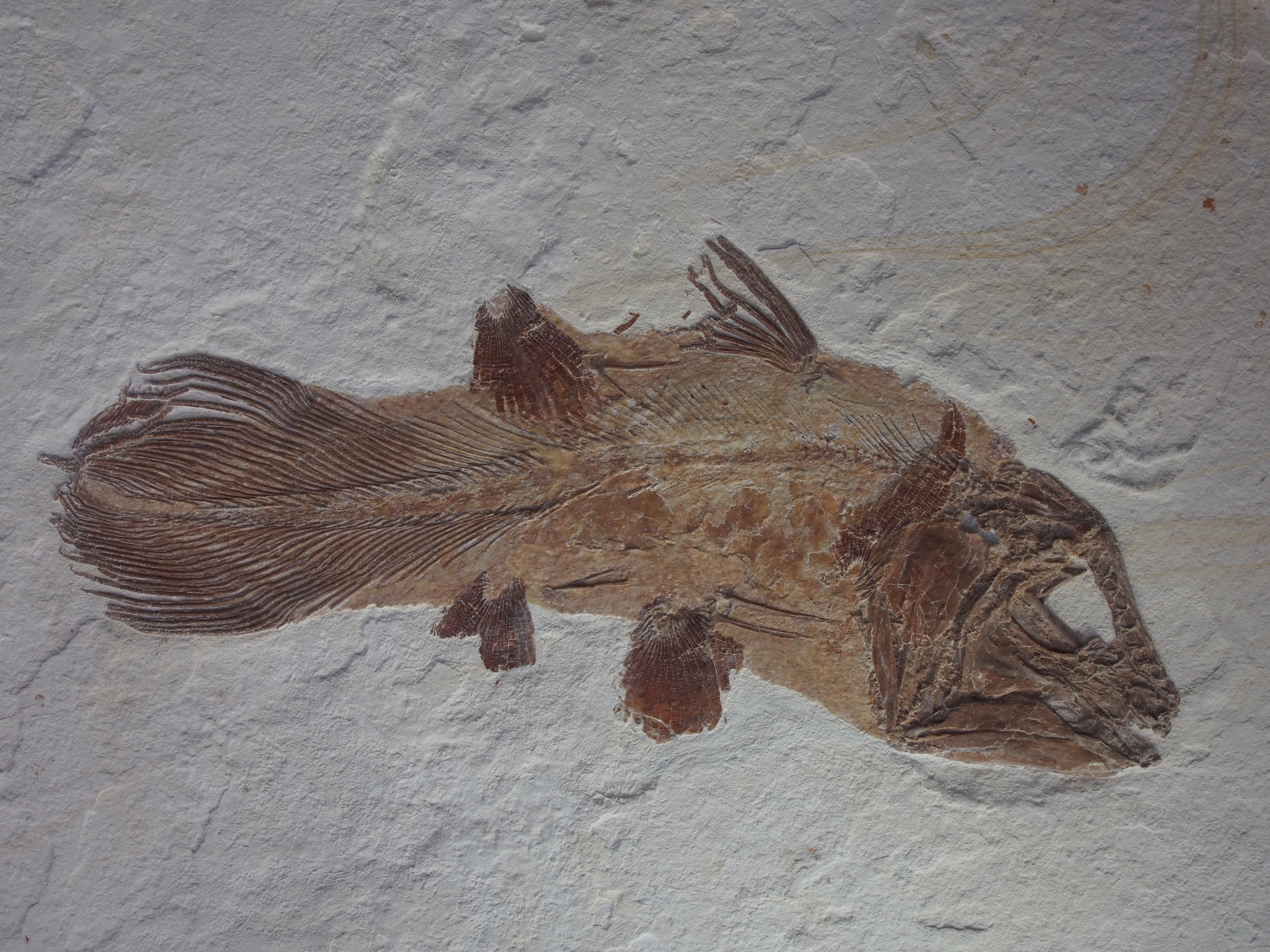
Undina penicillata, Jurassic Painten, Germany
