= List of the Paleozoic life of West Virginia =

Fossilized remains of the following life forms from the Paleozoic, between 538.8 and 252.17 million years ago, have been reported from within the US state of West Virginia.

== A ==
- †Acosmoblatta
  - †Acosmoblatta eakiniana – type locality for species
  - †Acosmoblatta permacra – type locality for species
- †Acrospirifer
- †Adiantities
  - †Adiantities beechensis – type locality for species
- †Adiantites
  - †Adiantites tenuifolius
- †Ageleodus
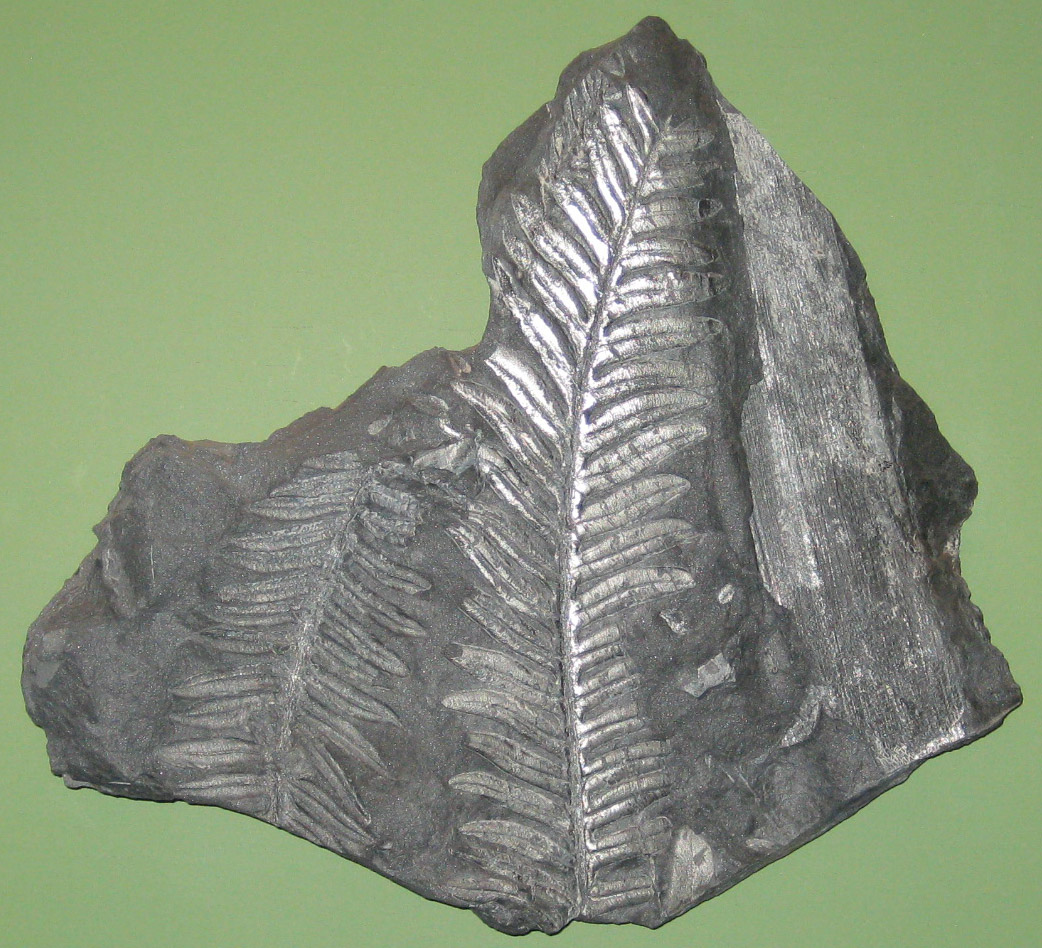
- Fossilized fronds of the Carboniferous-Early Cretaceous seed fern Alethopteris
  †Alethopteris
  - †Alethopteris ambigua – or unidentified comparable form
  - †Alethopteris aquilina
  - †Alethopteris decurrens
  - †Alethopteris evansii
  - †Alethopteris gigas
  - †Alethopteris grandini
  - †Alethopteris grandifolia – or unidentified comparable form
  - †Alethopteris massilionis
  - †Alethopteris lonchitica
  - †Alethopteris parva
  - †Alethopteris pennsylvanica
  - †Alethopteris serlii
    - †Alethopteris serlii var. americana
    - †Alethopteris serlii var. europaea
  - †Alethopteris sternberg
  - †Alethopteris virginiana
- †Allenella
  - †Allenella tullius
- †Amblyblatta
  - †Amblyblatta lata – type locality for species
- †Ambocoelia
  - †Ambocoelia gregaria
  - †Ambocoelia umbonata
- †Amoeboblatta
  - †Amoeboblatta permanenta – type locality for species
- †Aneimites
  - †Aneimites adiantoides
  - †Aneimites fertilis – previously classified as †Wardia fertilis
  - †Aneimites tenuifolius – or unidentified related form
- †Aneurophyton – or unidentified related form
  - †Aneurophyton olnense
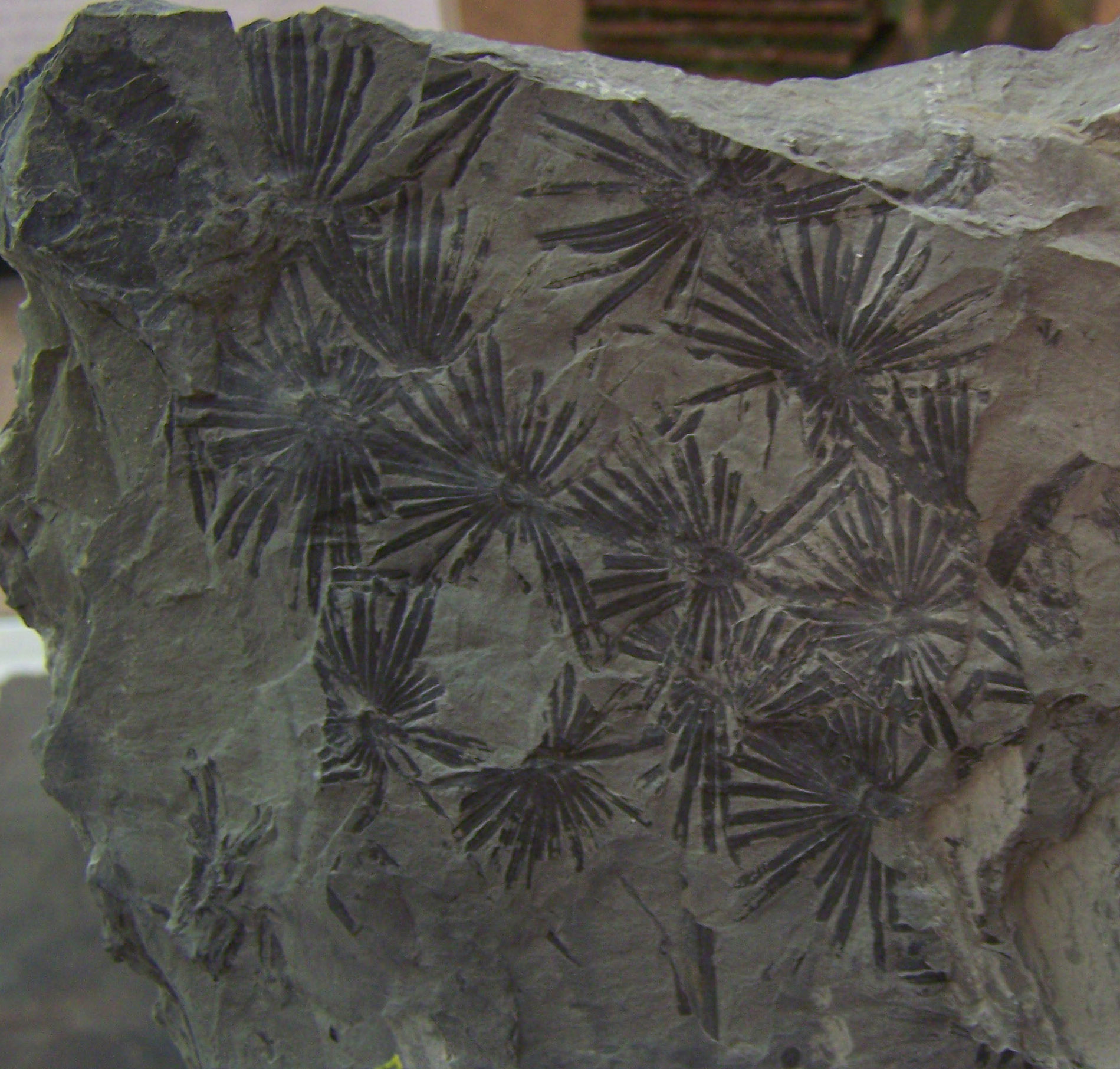
- Fossil of the Carboniferous horsetail relative Annularia
  †Annularia
  - †Annularia acicularis
  - †Annularia asteris
  - †Annularia carinata
  - †Annularia cuspidata
  - †Annularia galoides
  - †Annularia minuta
  - †Annularia mucronata
  - †Annularia radiata
  - †Annularia ramosa
  - †Annularia sphenophylloides
  - †Annularia stellata
- †Anoplea
  - †Anoplea nucleata
- †Anthraconauta
- †Aparchites
  - †Aparchites obliquatus
  - †Aparchites punctillosa
- †Apempherus
  - †Apempherus complexinervis – type locality for species
  - †Apempherus fossus – type locality for species
- †Aphlebia
  - †Aphlebia filiciformis
    - †Aphlebia filiciformis var. majus
  - †Aphlebia laciniata
  - †Aphlebia lactuca
  - †Aphlebia speciosissima
  - †Aphlebia spinosa
- †Archaeopteridium
  - †Archaeopteridium tschermackei
- †Archaeopteris
  - †Archaeopteris halliana
  - †Archaeopteris hibernica
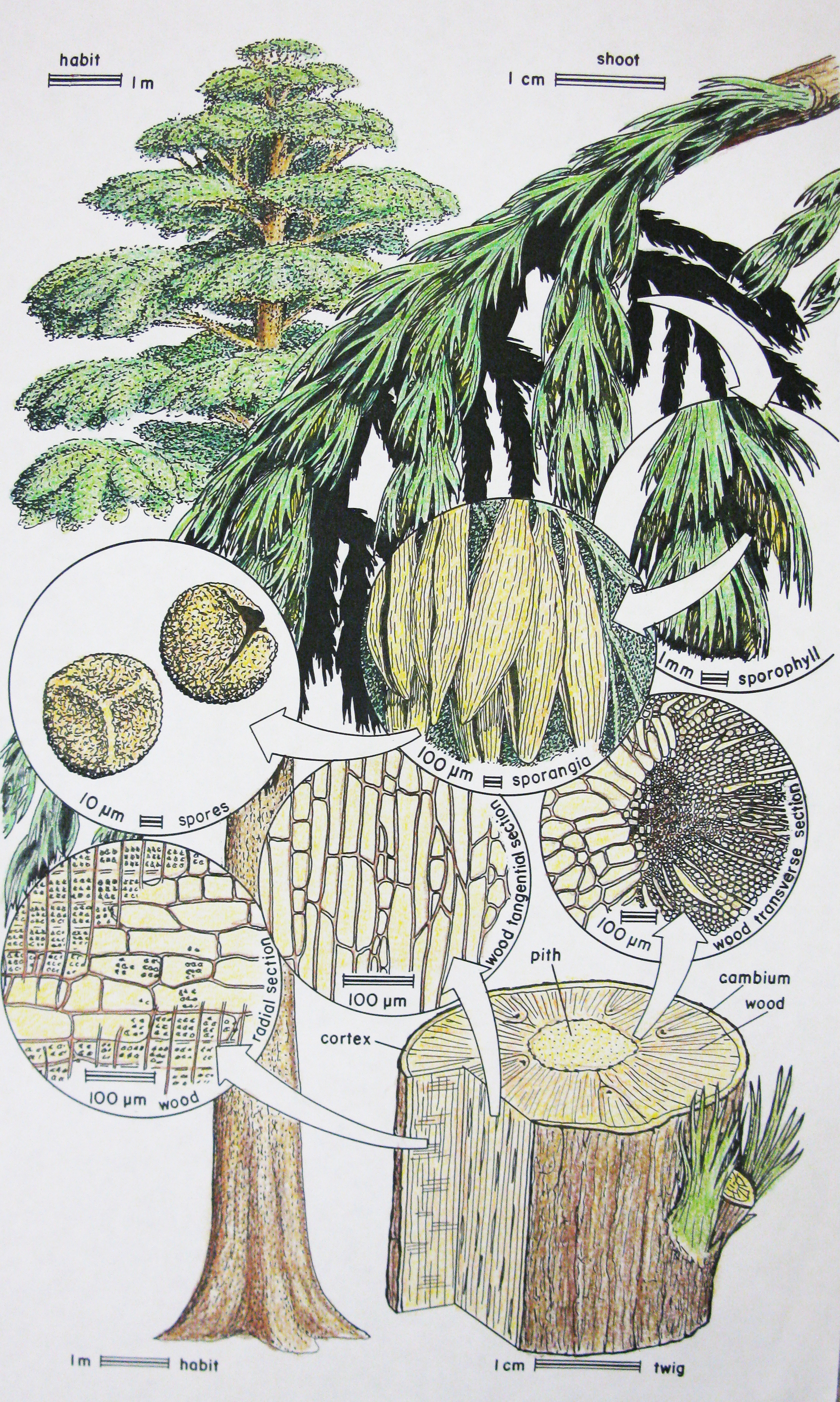
  - Life restoration of the Late Devonian-Carboniferous tree Archaeopteris macilenta with insets detailing its anatomy
    †Archaeopteris macilenta
  - †Archaeopteris obusa
  - †Archaeopteris sphenophyllifolia
  - †Archaeopteris stricta – or unidentified related form
- †Areomartus – type locality for genus
  - †Areomartus ovatus – type locality for species
- †Arrhythmoblatta
  - †Arrhythmoblatta detecta – type locality for species
  - †Arrhythmoblatta scudderiana – type locality for species
- †Artisia
  - †Artisia approximata
- †Asolanus
  - †Asolanus camptotaenia
- †Asterocalamites
  - †Asterocalamites scrobiculatus
- †Asterophyllites
  - †Asterophyllites charaeformis
  - †Asterophyllites equisetiformis
  - †Asterophyllites erectifolius
  - †Asterophyllites gracilis
  - †Asterophyllites longifolius
  - †Asterophyllites lycopodioides
  - †Asterophyllites minutus
  - †Asterophyllites rigidus
- †Athyris
  - †Athyris angelica
- †Atrypa
  - †Atrypa reticularis – report made of unidentified related form or using admittedly obsolete nomenclature
- †Aulacotheca
  - †Aulacotheca campbellii
- †Aulopora
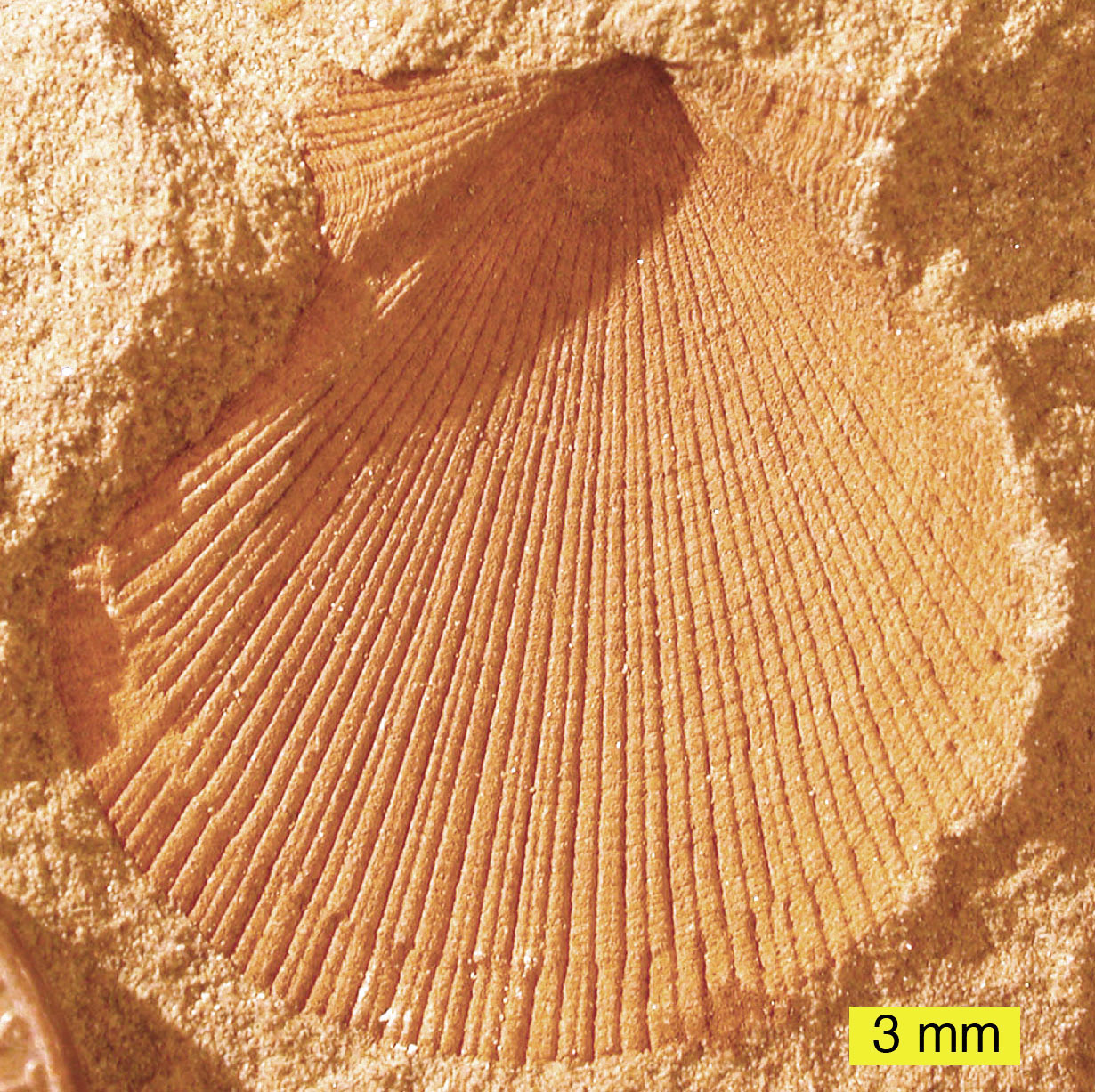
- Mold fossil of a shell of the Early Devonian-Late Triassic bivalve Aviculopecten
  †Aviculopecten
  - †Aviculopecten batesvillensis
  - †Aviculopecten crenistriatus – or unidentified comparable form

== B ==
- †Baiera
  - †Baiera braun
  - †Baiera virginiana
- †Barbclabornia
  - †Barbclabornia luedersensis
- †Barinophyton
  - †Barinophyton sibiricum
- †Bassipterus
  - †Bassipterus virginicus
- †Beyrichia
  - †Beyrichia moodeyi
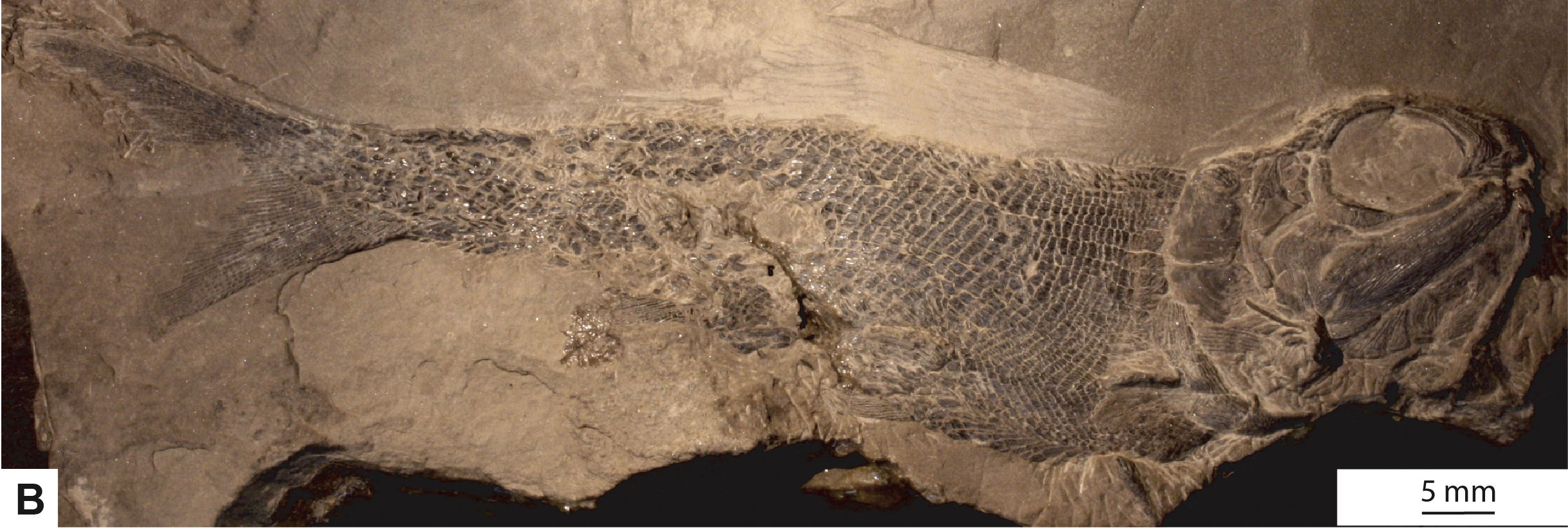
- Fossilized skeleton found in Mercer County; the holotype of the Carboniferous bony fish Bluefieldius. Close-up view of the skull at right.
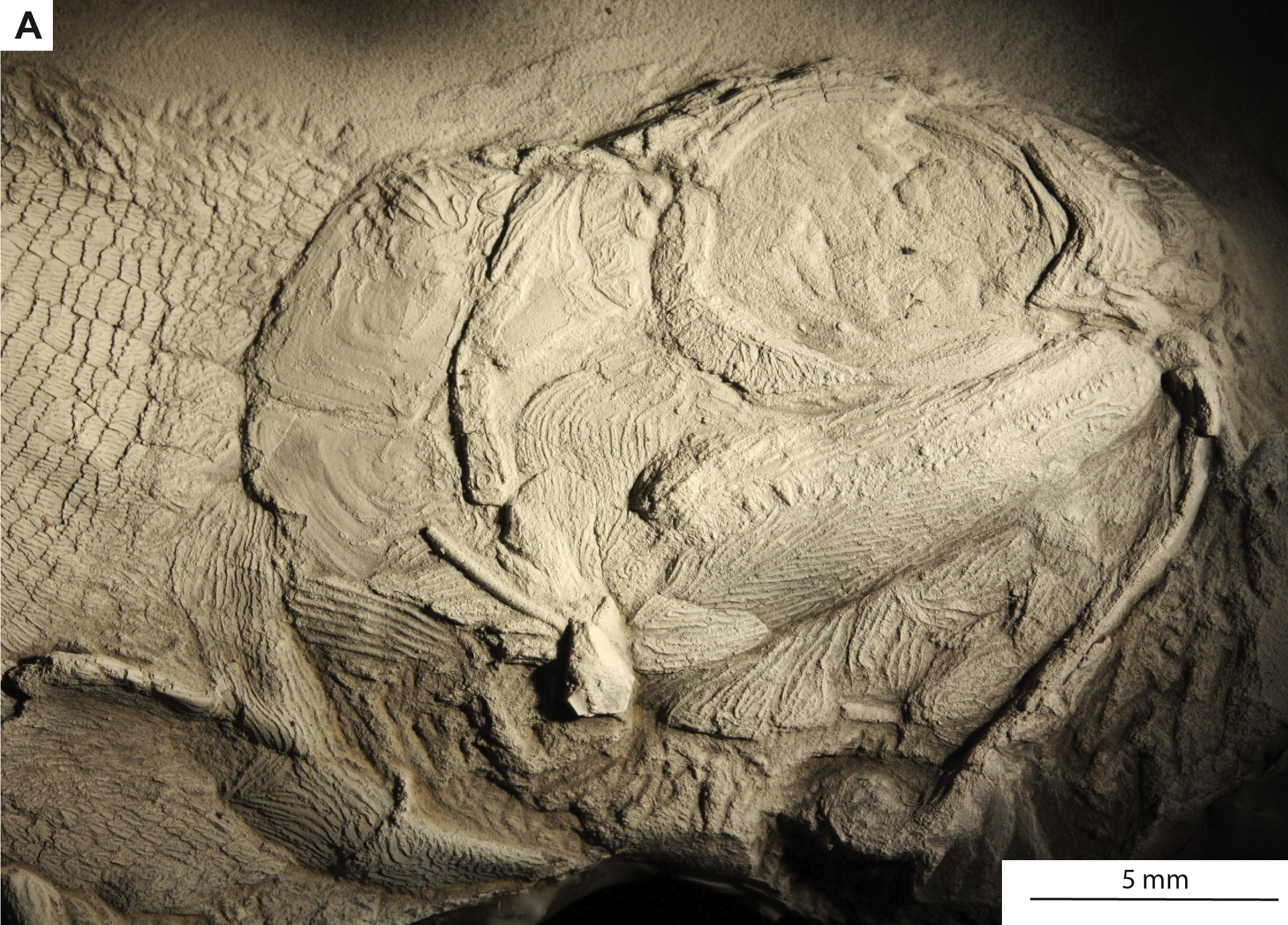
  †Bluefieldius
  - †Bluefieldius mercerensis
- †Bollia
  - †Bollia hama
  - †Bollia hindei
  - †Bollia nitida
  - †Bollia planofibra
  - †Bollia ungula
- †Bothrodendron
  - †Bothrodendron minutifolium – or unidentified comparable form
- †Bradyblatta
  - †Bradyblatta mucronata – type locality for species
  - †Bradyblatta sagittaria – type locality for species
- †Buthotrephis
  - †Buthotrephis gracilis
- Bythocypris
  - †Bythocypris keyserensis
  - †Bythocypris phaseolina

== C ==
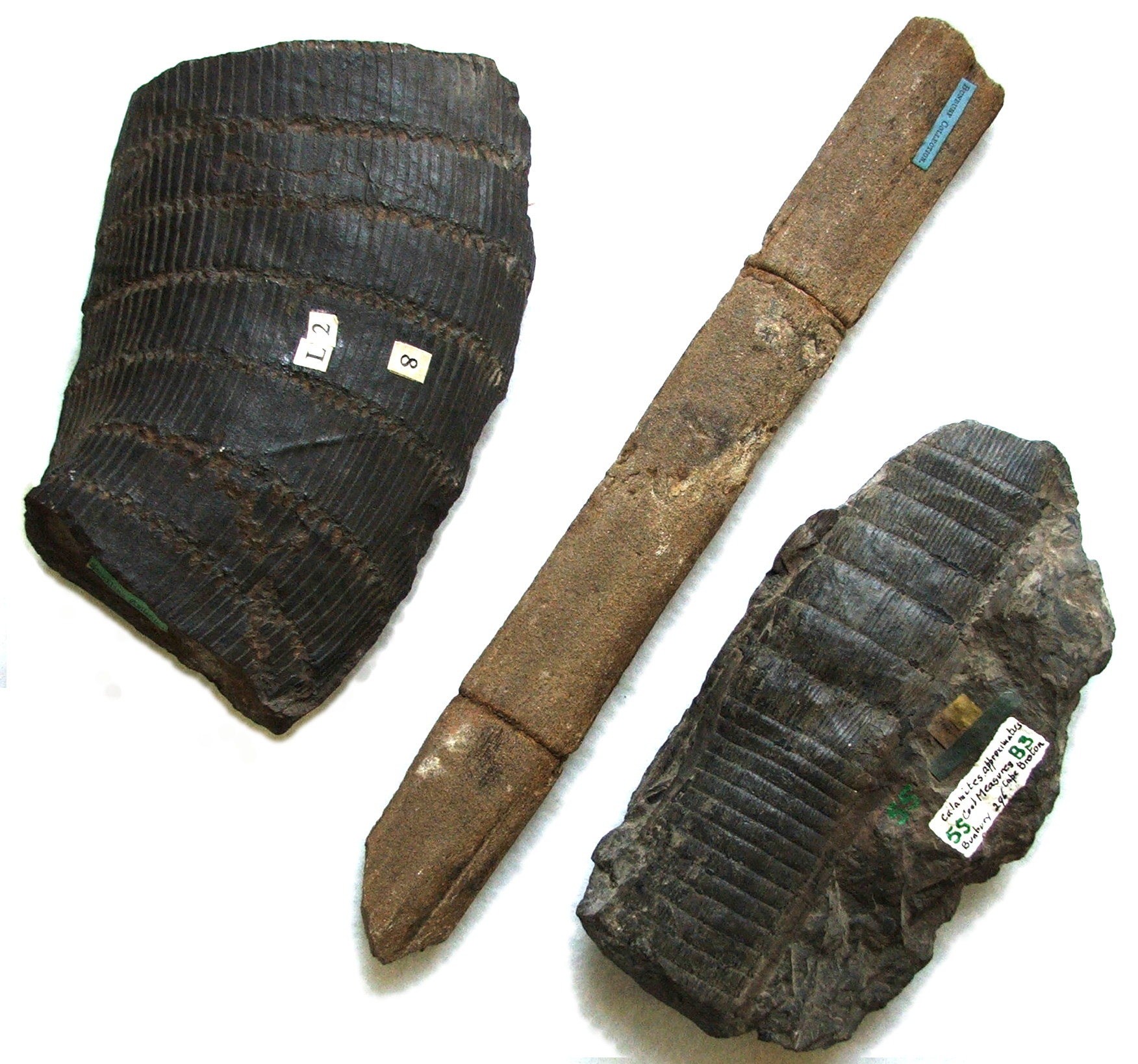
- Fossilized stems from the Carboniferous-Permian horsetail relative Calamites
  †Calamites
  - †Calamites approximatus
  - †Calamites cannaeformis
  - †Calamites cistii
  - †Calamites radiatus
  - †Calamites ramosus
  - †Calamites roemeri
  - †Calamites suckowi
  - †Calamites suckowii
- †Calamostachys
  - †Calamostachys lanceolata
  - †Calamostachys ramosus
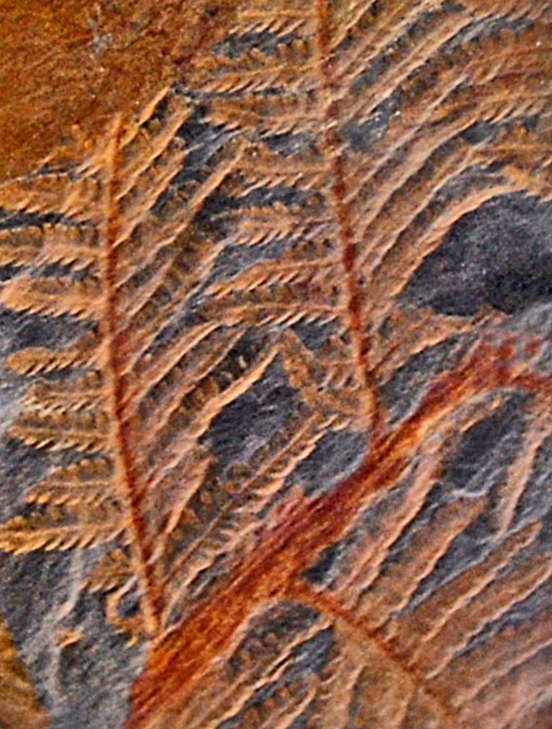
- Fossilized fronds of the Carboniferous seed fern Callipteridium
  †Callipteridium
  - †Callipteridium dawsonianum
  - †Callipteridium grandifolium
  - †Callipteridium inaequale
  - †Callipteridium oblongifolium
  - †Callipteridium odontopteroides
  - †Callipteridium unitum
- †Callipteris
  - †Callipteris conferta
  - †Callipteris diabolica
- †Callixylon
  - †Callixylon erianum
- †Calymene
  - †Calymene camerata
  - †Calymene cresapensis
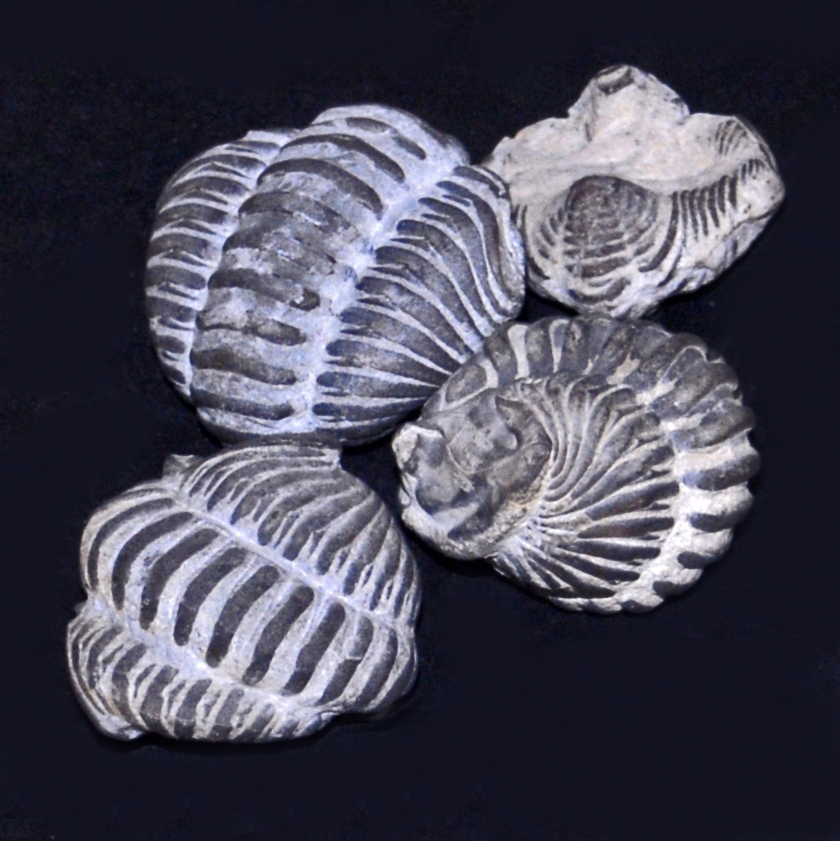
  - Fossils in enrolled posture of the Silurian trilobite Calymene niagarensis
    †Calymene niagarensis
- †Camarotoechia
  - †Camarotoechia andrewsi
  - †Camarotoechia limitare
  - †Camarotoechia litchfieldensis
  - †Camarotoechia tonolowayensis
- †Caneyella
  - †Caneyella richardsoni
- †Cardiocarpon
  - †Cardiocarpon bicuspidatum
  - †Cardiocarpon cornutum
  - †Cardiocarpon elongatum
  - †Cardiocarpon minor
- †Cardiocarpus
- †Cardiomorpha
  - †Cardiomorpha obovata
- †Cardiopteris
  - †Cardiopteris frondosa
- †Carniodus
  - †Carniodus carnulus
- †Carpolithes
  - †Carpolithes bi-carpus
  - †Carpolithes ellipticus
  - †Carpolithes fragarioides – tentative report
  - †Carpolithes marginatus
  - †Carpolithes virginianus – type locality for species
- †Caulopteris
  - †Caulopteris elliptica
  - †Caulopteris gigantea
- †Cavellina
  - †Cavellina planoprocliva
- †Charbeckia
  - †Charbeckia macrophylla
- †Cheilanthites
  - †Cheilanthites nummularius – or unidentified comparable form.
  - †Cheilanthites obtusilobus
    - †Cheilanthites obtusilobus var. dilatata
  - †Cheilanthites solidus
  - †Cheilanthites squamosus
  - †Cheilanthites trifoliatus
- †Chonetes
  - †Chonetes novascoticus
- †Clidochirus
- †Coelospira
  - †Coelospira sulcata
- †Condrusia
- †Cordaicarpon
  - †Cordaicarpon circularis
  - †Cordaicarpon cinctum
  - †Cordaicarpon gutbieri
- †Cordaites
  - †Cordaites borassifolius
  - †Cordaites crassinervis
  - †Cordaites principalis
  - †Cordaites robbii
- †Cornulites
- †Courvoisiella
  - †Courvoisiella ctenomorpha
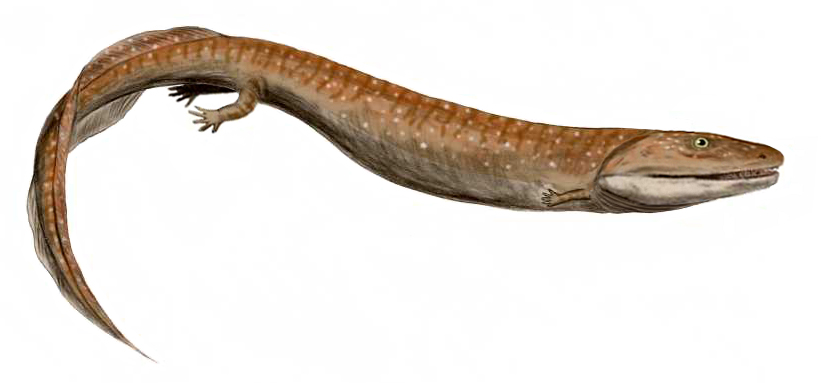
- Life restoration of the Carboniferous four-limbed animal precursor Crassigyrinus
  †Crassigyrinus
- †Crossoceras
  - †Crossoceras belandi
- †Crurispina
  - †Crurispina nana
- †Cupularostrum
  - †Cupularostrum contracta
- †Cyclopteris
  - †Cyclopteris valida – probably the same as Triphyllopteris virginiana
- †Cyperites
  - †Cyperites bicarinatus
- †Cypricardella

== D ==
- †Dalmanella
  - †Dalmanella lenticularis
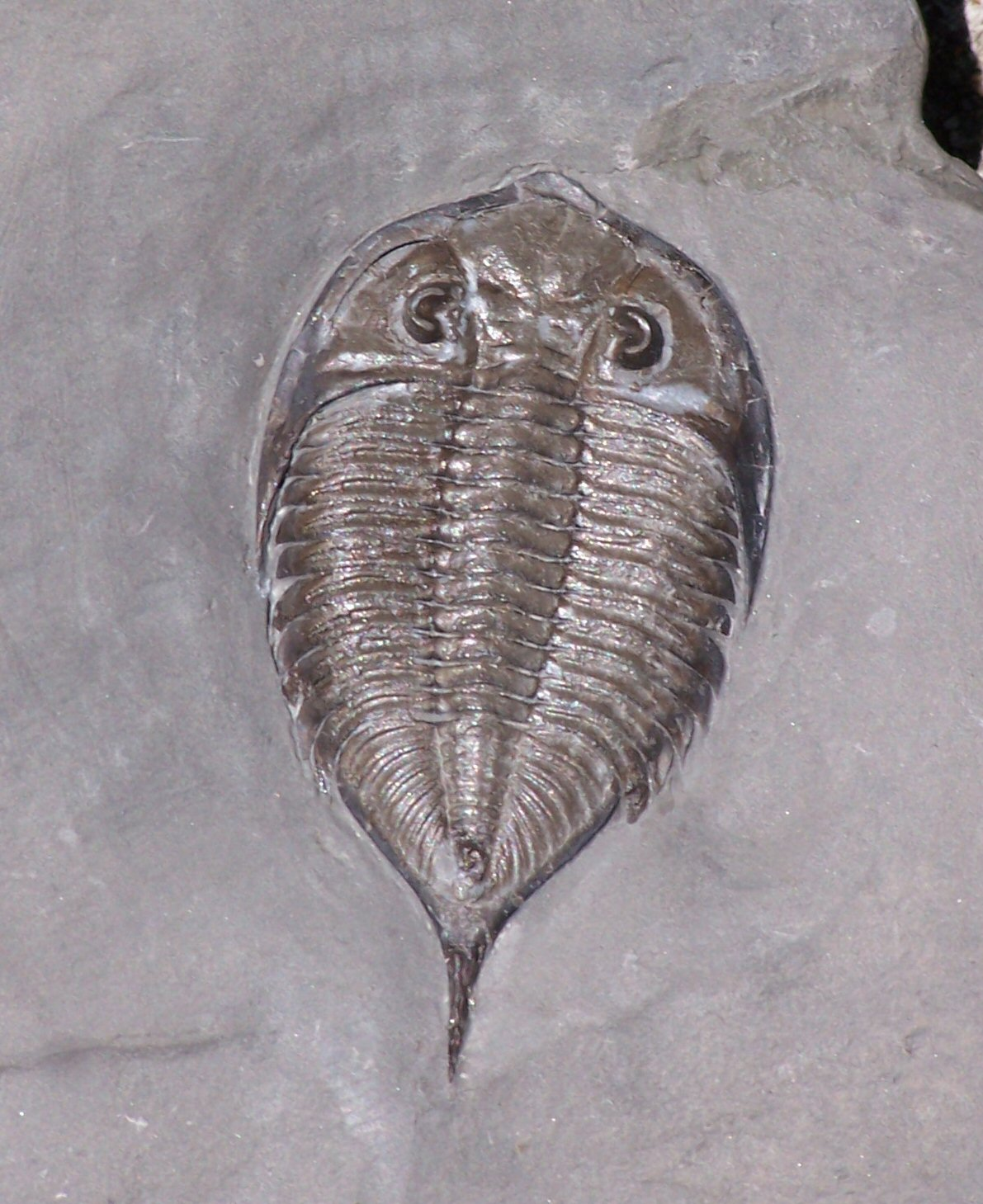
- Fossil of the Late Ordovician-Middle Devonian trilobite Dalmanites
  †Dalmanites
  - †Dalmanites limulurus
- †Danaeides
  - †Danaeides emersoni
- †Delthyris
- †Deltopecten
  - †Deltopecten caneyanus – or unidentified comparable form
- †Devonochonetes
  - †Devonochonetes coronatus
  - †Devonochonetes scitulus
- †Dibolbina
  - †Dibolbina cristata
- †Dichophyllum
  - †Dichophyllum moorei
- †Dicladoblatta
  - †Dicladoblatta defossa – type locality for species
- †Diedrorynchus – type locality for genus
  - †Diedrorynchus dictyum – type locality for species
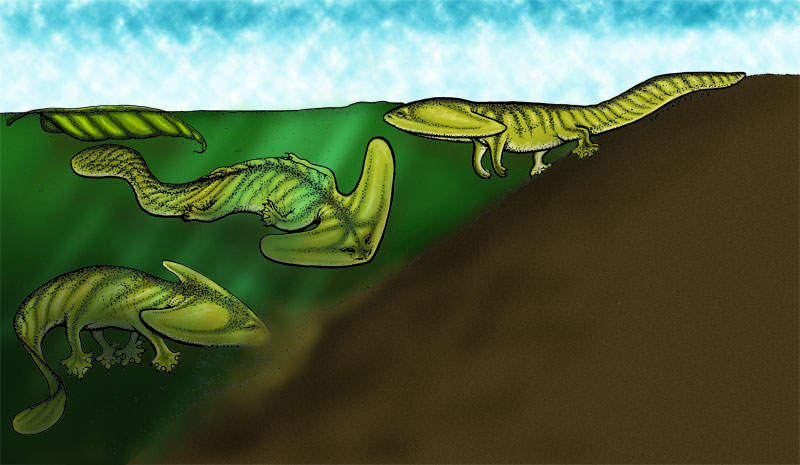
- Life restoration of a swimming group of the Permian amphibian Diploceraspis
  †Diploceraspis
  - †Diploceraspis burkei
- †Diplothema
  - †Diplothema pachyderma
- †Distomodus
  - †Distomodus nodosus – type locality for species
- †Ditomopyge
  - †Ditomopyge decurtata
- †Dizygopleura
  - †Dizygopleura costata
  - †Dizygopleura halli
  - †Dizygopleura orealis
  - †Dizygopleura simulans
  - †Dizygopleura subovalis
- †Dolerotheca
  - †Dolerotheca pennsylvanica
- †Donaldina
  - †Donaldina superclivis – type locality for species
- †Douvillina
  - †Douvillina inequistriata
- †Drepanellina
  - †Drepanellina clarki
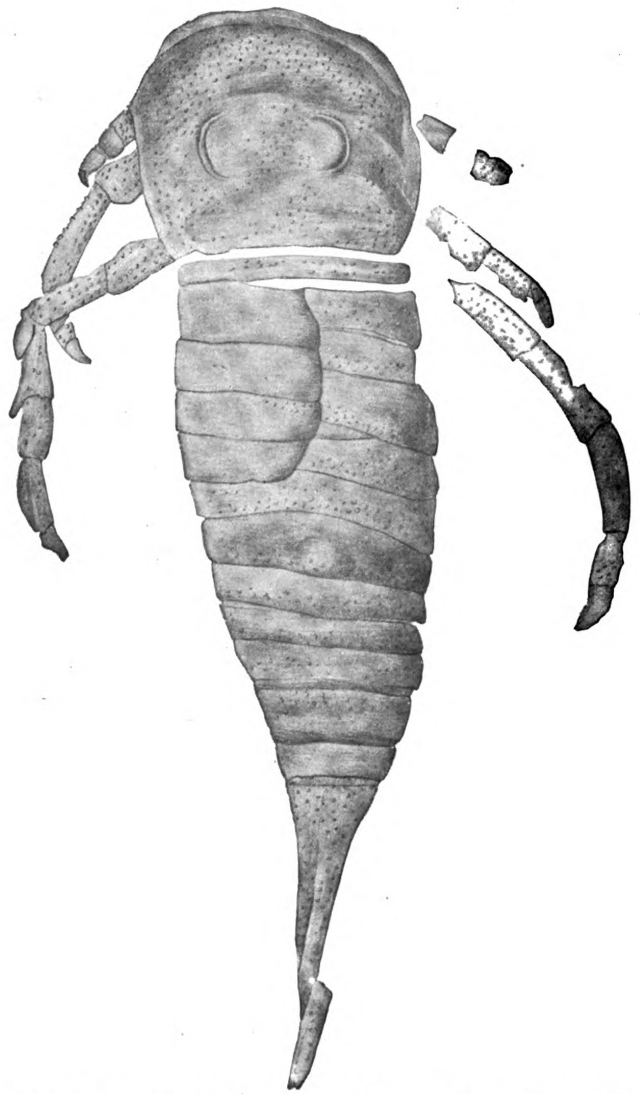
- Fossil of the Silurian-Late Devonian eurypterid ("sea scorpion") Drepanopterus
  †Drepanopterus
  - †Drepanopterus nodosus

== E ==
- †Ectogrammysia
  - †Ectogrammysia inaffecta – type locality for species
  - †Ectogrammysia prolata – type locality for species
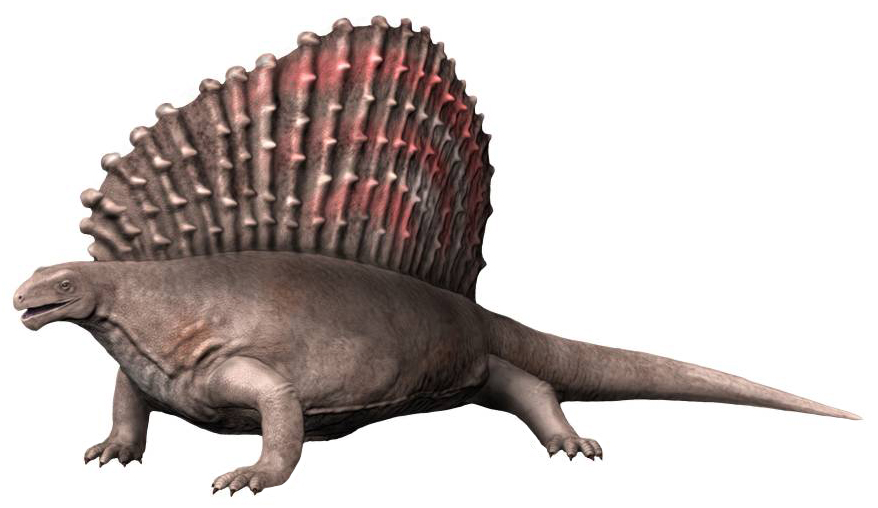
- Life restoration of the Permian synapsid (mammal precursor) Edaphosaurus
  †Edaphosaurus
  - †Edaphosaurus colohistion – type locality for species
- †Edmondia
  - †Edmondia equilateralis
  - †Edmondia equilateralus
  - †Edmondia suborbiculata
- †Elkinsia
  - †Elkinsia polymorpha
- †Endelocrinus
  - †Endelocrinus kieri
- †Equisetides
  - †Equisetides rugosus
  - †Equisetides schimper
  - †Equisetides striatus
- †Equisetites
  - †Equisetites elongatus
  - †Equisetites occidentalis
  - †Equisetites rugosus
  - †Equisetites striatus
- †Eremopteris
  - †Eremopteris artemisiaefolia
  - †Eremopteris cheathami
  - †Eremopteris decomposita – or unidentified comparable form
  - †Eremopteris elegans – or unidentified comparable form
  - †Eremopteris lincolniana – or unidentified comparable form
  - †Eremopteris macilenta
  - †Eremopteris microphylla
  - †Eremopteris sauvieri – or unidentified comparable form
- †Etoblattina
  - †Etoblattina aperta – type locality for species
  - †Etoblattina exigua – type locality for species
- †Eucalyptocrinites
- †Eukloedenella
  - †Eukloedenella umbiculata
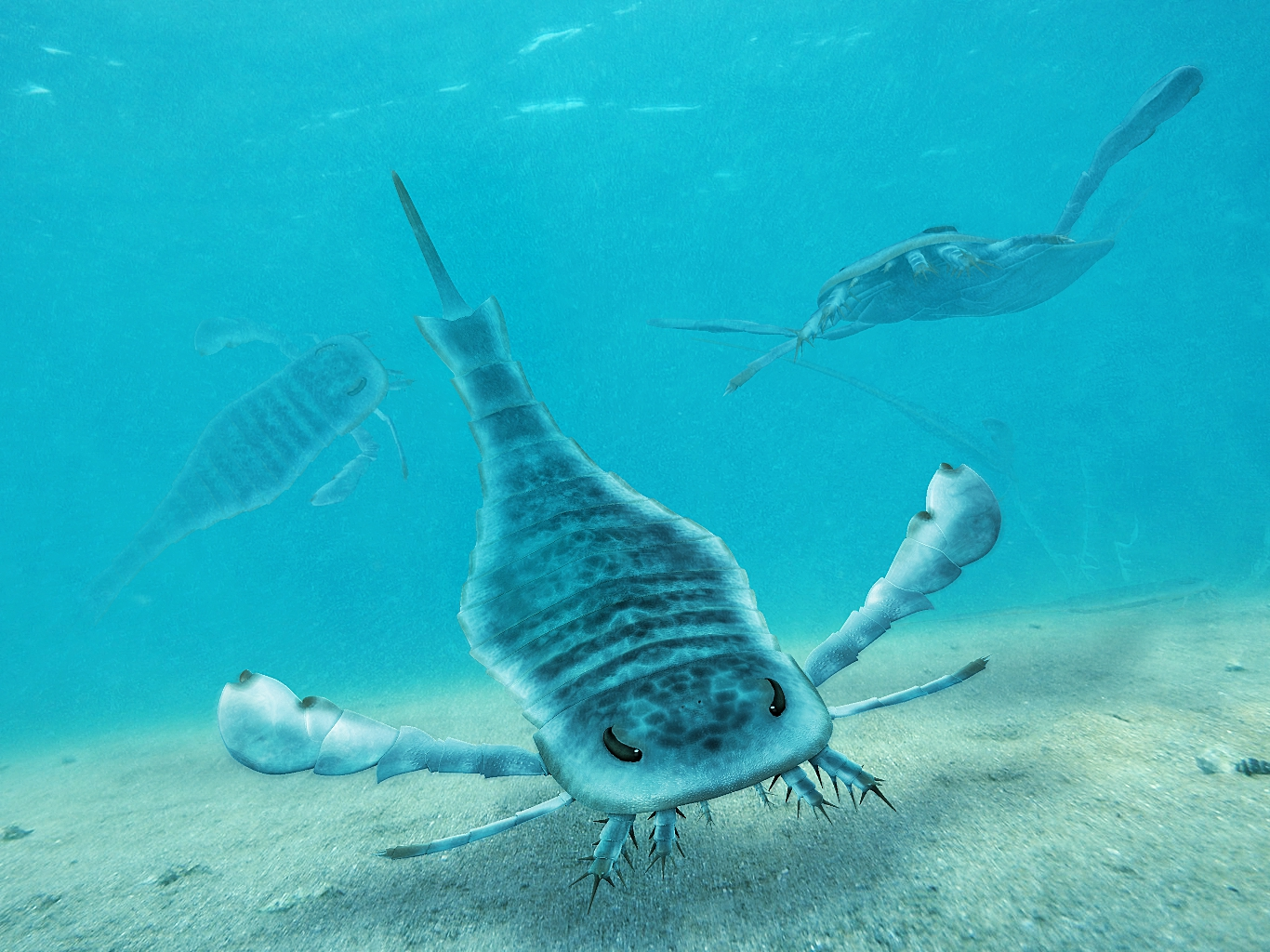
- Life restoration of Silurian eurypterid ("sea scorpion") Eurypterus
  †Eurypterus
- †Eurytaenia – type locality for genus
  - †Eurytaenia virginiana – type locality for species
- †Eviostachya – or unidentified comparable form

== F ==
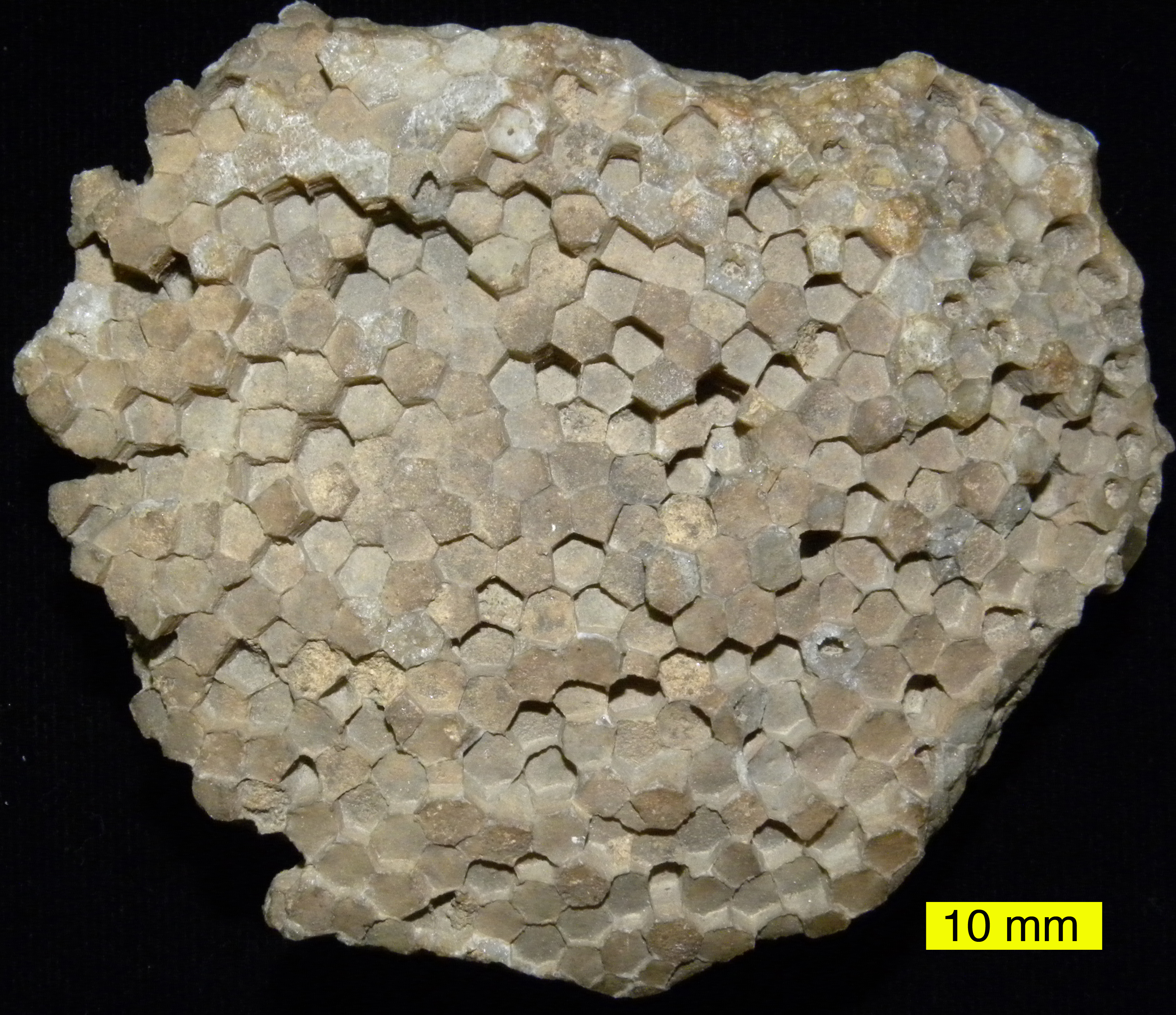
- Fossil of the Late Ordovician-Permian tabulate coral Favosites
  †Favosites
  - †Favosites helderbergiae
- †Floweria
  - †Floweria chemungensis

== G ==
- †Gerablattina
  - †Gerablattina eversa – type locality for species
  - †Gerablattina inculta – type locality for species
  - †Gerablattina perita – type locality for species
- †Gillespia
  - †Gillespia randolphensis
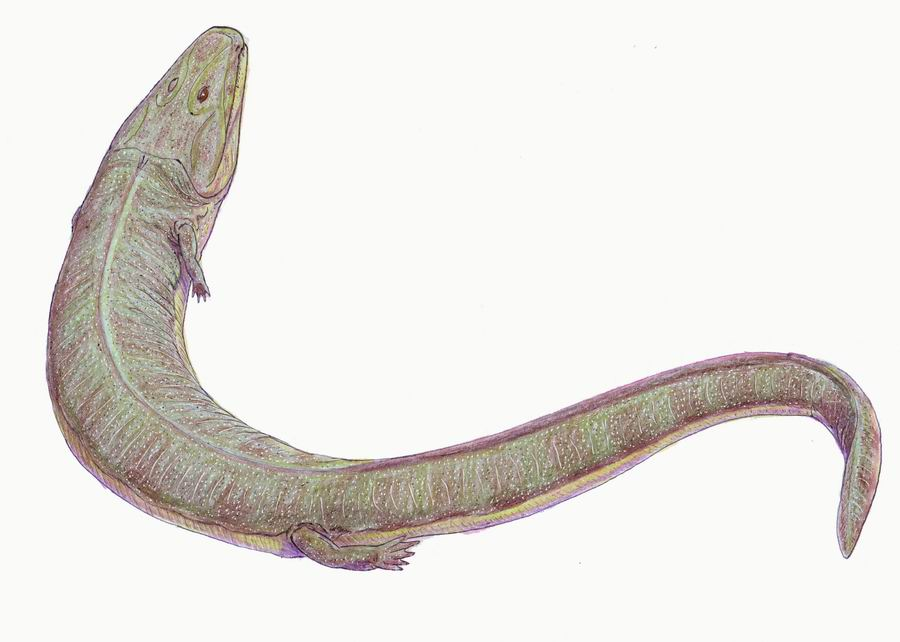
- Life restoration of the Carboniferous four-limbed animal precursor Greererpeton
  †Greererpeton
  - †Greererpeton burkemorani
- †Guilielmites
  - †Guilielmites geinitz
  - †Guilielmites orbicularis
- †Gypidula
  - †Gypidula coeymanensis
- †Gyracanthus

== H ==
- †Halliella
  - †Halliella fissurella
  - †Halliella subequata
- †Halonia
- †Hapalocrinus
- †Hierogramma
- †Hindella
  - †Hindella congregata
- †Holcospermum
  - †Holcospermum maizerentense
- †Holopea
  - †Holopea flintstonensis
- †Homeospira
  - †Homeospira evax
- †Hormotoma
  - †Hormotoma rowei
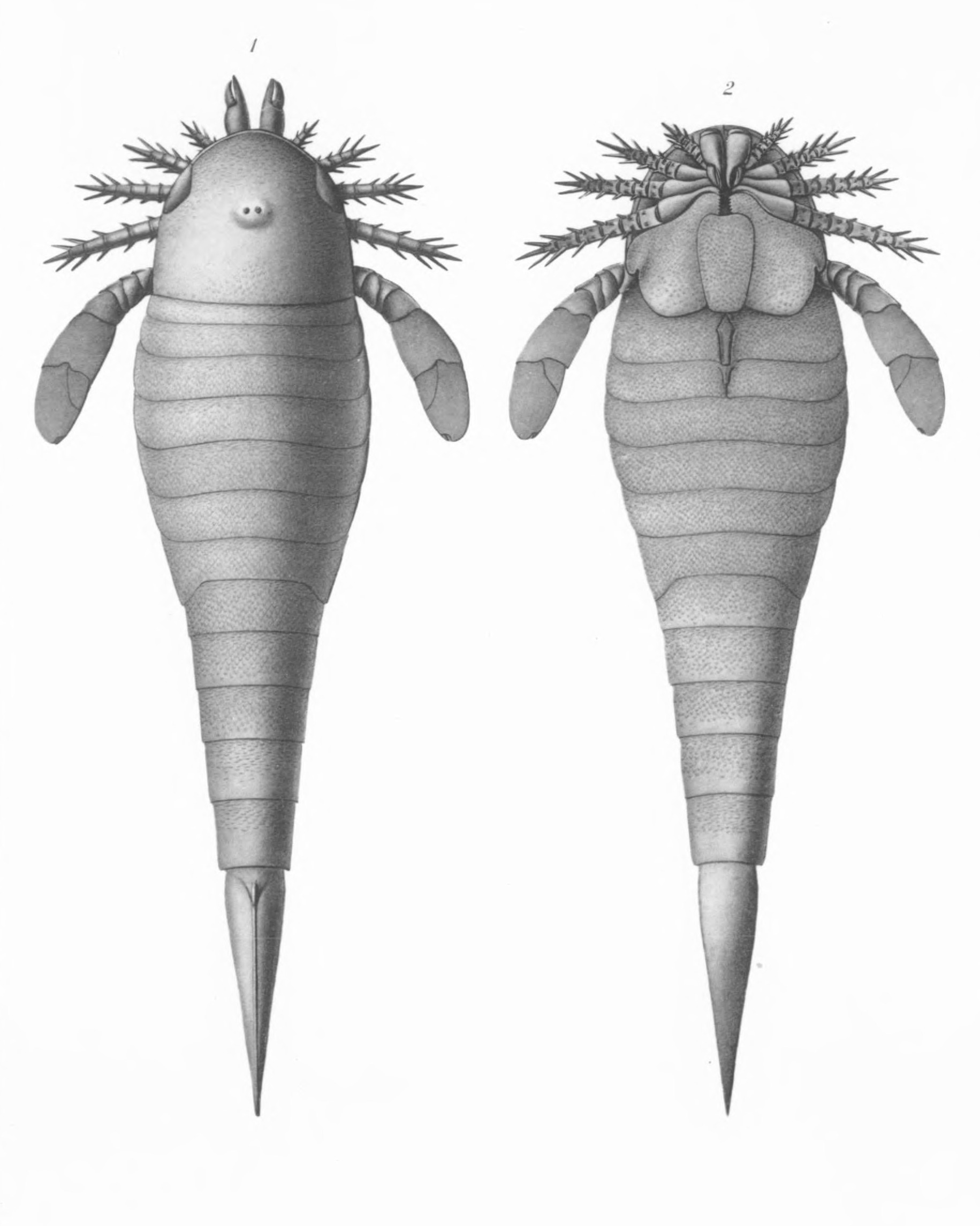
- Life restoration in multiple views of the Silurian eurypterid ("sea scorpion") Hughmilleria
  †Hughmilleria
  - †Hughmilleria bellistriata
- †Hylopus
  - †Hylopus hamesi
- †Hyphantozyga
  - †Hyphantozyga fenestrata – type locality for species

== J ==
- †Jaeckelocystis

== K ==
- †Kloedenella
  - †Kloedenella bisulcata
- †Kloedenia
  - †Kloedenia clarkei
  - †Kloedenia normalis

== L ==
- †Leperditia
  - †Leperditia alta
  - †Leperditia elongata – or unidentified comparable form
  - †Leperditia scalaris
- †Lepidocystis
  - †Lepidocystis vesicularis
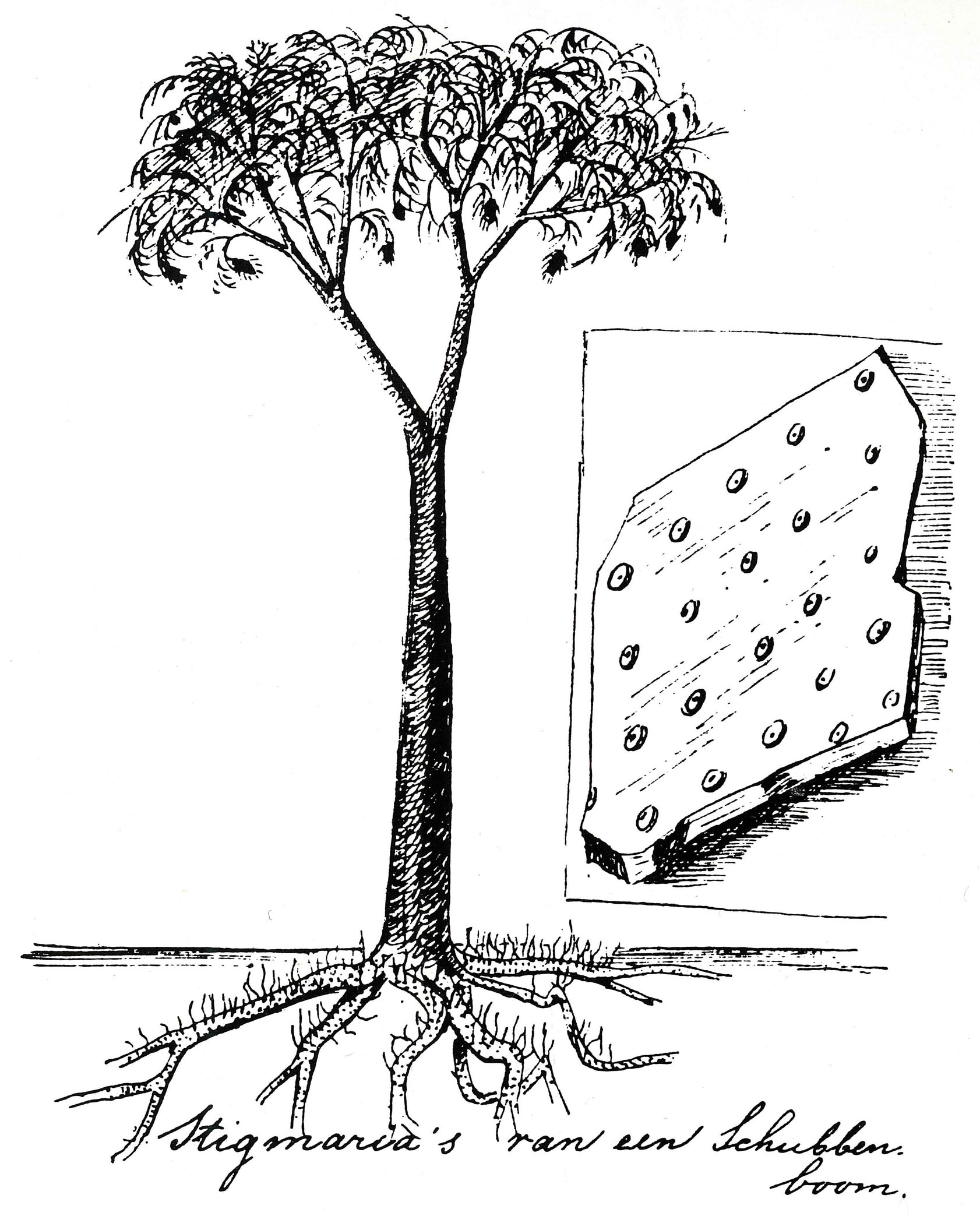
- Restoration of the Carboniferous-Late Triassic club moss relative Lepidodendron. Eli Heimans (1911).
  †Lepidodendron
  - †Lepidodendron aculeatum
  - †Lepidodendron acuminatum
  - †Lepidodendron brittsii – or unidentified comparable form
  - †Lepidodendron clypeatum
  - †Lepidodendron dichotomum – or unidentified comparable form
  - †Lepidodendron lanceolatum
  - †Lepidodendron magnum – or unidentified comparable form
  - †Lepidodendron modulatum
  - †Lepidodendron obovatum
  - †Lepidodendron rushvillense
  - †Lepidodendron selaginoides
  - †Lepidodendron sternbergii
  - †Lepidodendron veltheimianum
- †Lepidodendropsis
  - †Lepidodendropsis scobiniformis
- †Lepidophloios
  - †Lepidophloios laricinus – or unidentified comparable form
- †Lepidophyllum
  - †Lepidophyllum acuminatum
  - †Lepidophyllum brevifolium
  - †Lepidophyllum campbellianum
  - †Lepidophyllum cultriforme – or unidentified comparable form
  - †Lepidophyllum hastatum
  - †Lepidophyllum jenneyi
  - †Lepidophyllum lanceolatum
  - †Lepidophyllum oblongifolium
- †Lepidostrobophyllum
- †Lepidostrobus
  - †Lepidostrobus ornatus
  - †Lepidostrobus salisburyi
  - †Lepidostrobus variabilis
- †Lepocrinites
  - †Lepocrinites gebhardi
- †Leptaena
  - †Leptaena rhomboidalis – report made of unidentified related form or using admittedly obsolete nomenclature
- †Leptodesma
  - †Leptodesma matheri
  - †Leptodesma occidentale – or unidentified related form
  - †Leptodesma pennsylvanica
  - †Leptodesma spinerigum
- †Leptostrophia
  - †Leptostrophia bipartita
  - †Leptostrophia proutyi
- †Lescuropteris
  - †Lescuropteris adiantites
  - †Lescuropteris moorii
- †Levizygopleura
  - †Levizygopleura inornata
- †Limipecten
  - †Limipecten greerensis – type locality for species
- †Limnopus
  - †Limnopus glenshawensis
- †Limnosceloides – type locality for genus
  - †Limnosceloides dunkardensis – type locality for species
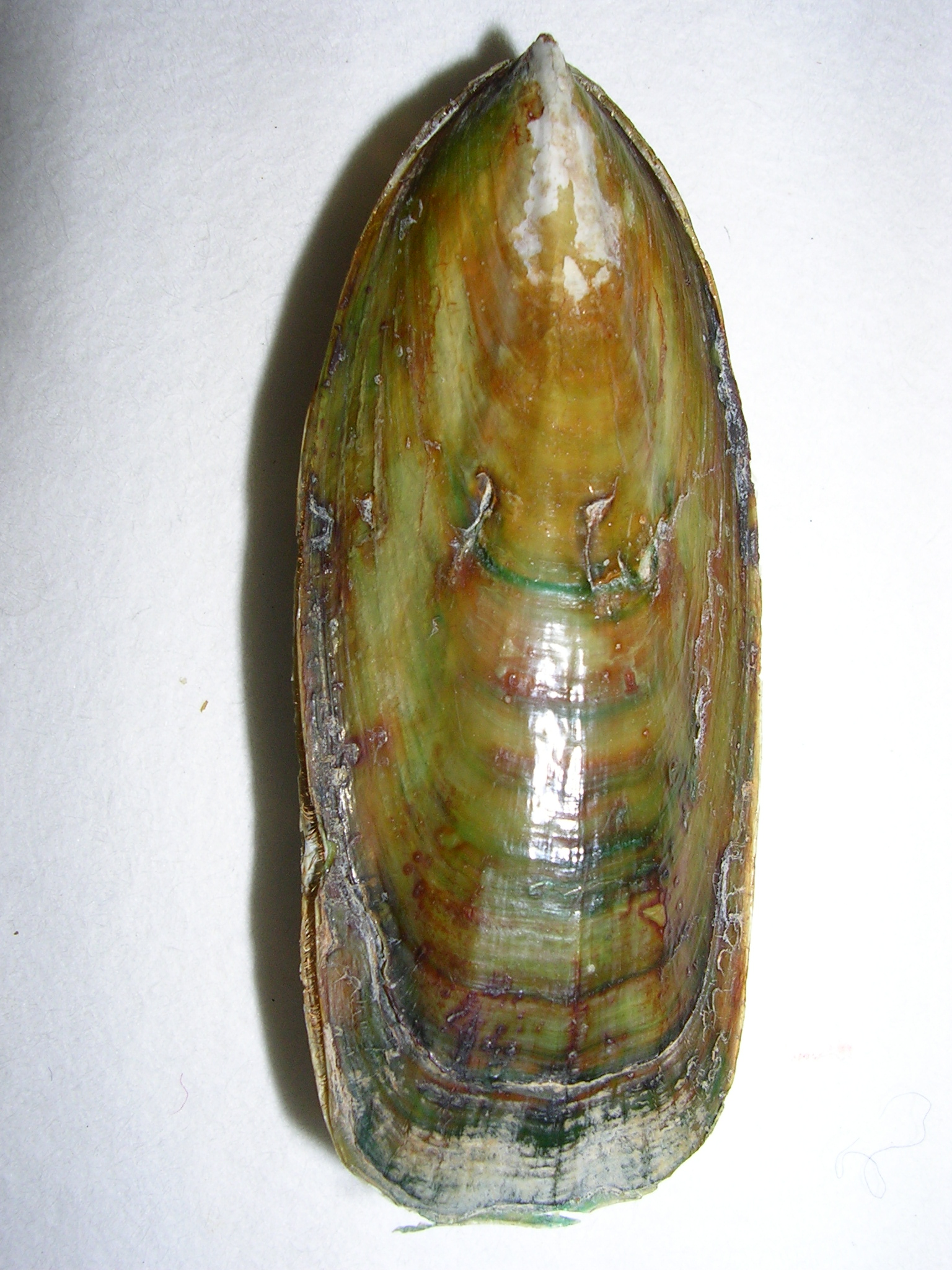
- Shell of the Cambrian-modern brachiopod Lingula
  †Lingula
- †Linopteris
  - †Linopteris neuropteroides
  - †Linopteris obliqua
- †Liocalymene
  - †Liocalymene clintoni
- †Liparoblatta
  - †Liparoblatta ovata – type locality for species
  - †Liparoblatta radiata – type locality for species
- †Lithostrotion
  - †Lithostrotion angustum
- †Lycopodites
  - †Lycopodites meekii
  - †Lycopodites pendulus
  - †Lycopodites simplex
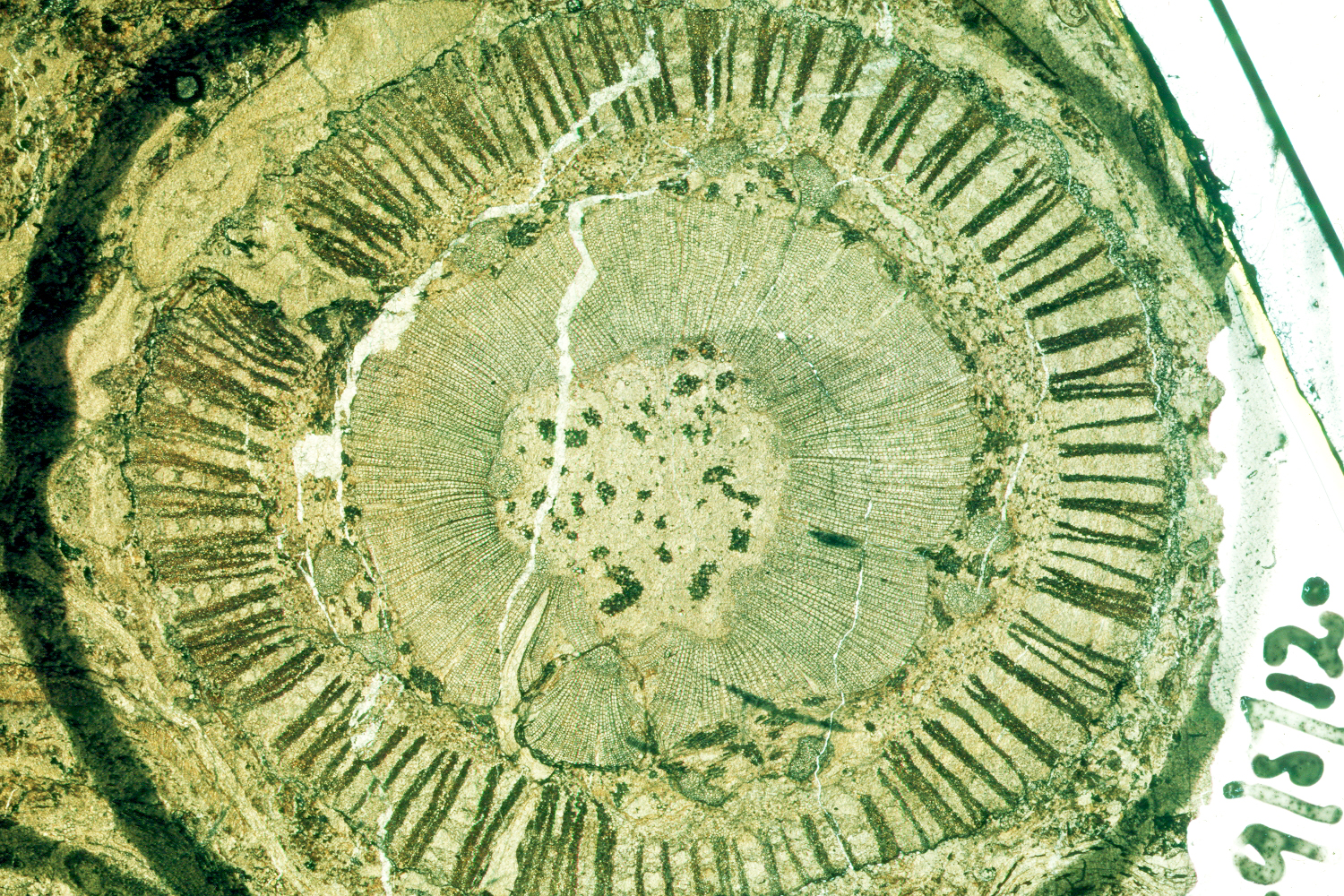
- Fossil in cross section of the Carboniferous seed fern stem Lyginopteris
  †Lyginopteris
  - †Lyginopteris bermudensiformis
  - †Lyginopteris fragilis
  - †Lyginopteris hoeninghausi
  - †Lyginopteris hoeninghausii

== M ==
- †Macrostachya
- †Mariacrinus – report made of unidentified related form or using admittedly obsolete nomenclature
  - †Mariacrinus stoloniferus
- †Mariopteris
  - †Mariopteris andraena
  - †Mariopteris acuta
  - †Mariopteris dimorpha – or unidentified comparable form
  - †Mariopteris inflata
  - †Mariopteris latifolia
  - †Mariopteris muricata
  - †Mariopteris nervosa
  - †Mariopteris newberryi
  - †Mariopteris pottsvillea
  - †Mariopteris pygmaea
  - †Mariopteris sillimanni
  - †Mariopteris sphenopteroides
  - †Mariopteris spinulosa – tentative report
- †Mediospirifer
  - †Mediospirifer audaculus
- †Megakozlowskiella
  - †Megakozlowskiella sculptilis
- †Megalichthyes – or unidentified comparable form
- †Megalopteris
  - †Megalopteris dawsoni – or unidentified comparable form
  - †Megalopteris hartii
  - †Megalopteris sewellensis
- †Metapoblatta – type locality for genus
  - †Metapoblatta microptera – type locality for species
- †Microsphaeridiorhynchus
  - †Microsphaeridiorhynchus litchfieldensis
- †Modiolopsis
  - †Modiolopsis gregarius
- †Modiolus
  - †Modiolus waverliensis – or unidentified comparable form
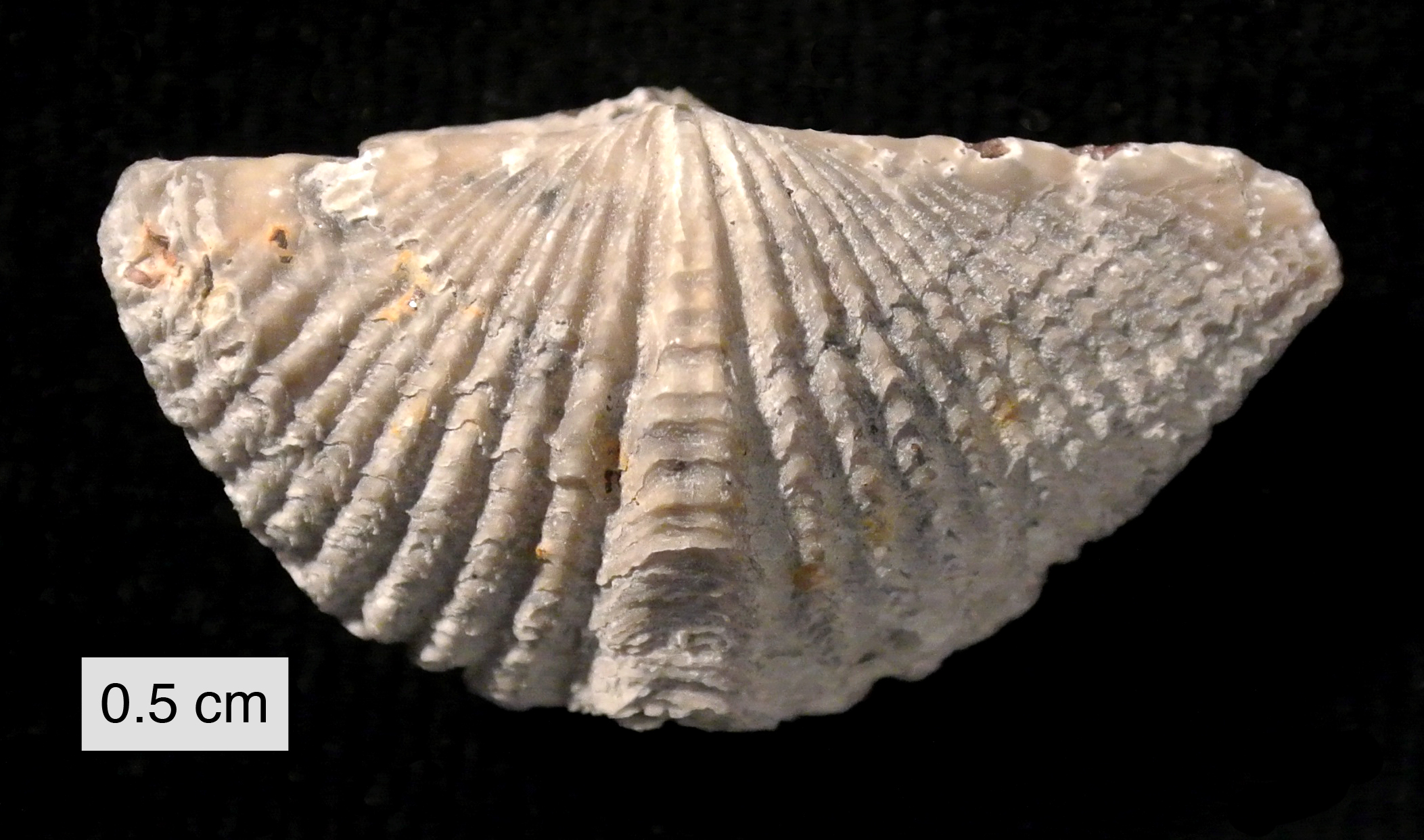
- Fossilized shell of the Devonian brachiopod Mucrospirifer
  †Mucrospirifer
  - †Mucrospirifer mucronatus
- †Murchisonia
  - †Murchisonia minuta
- †Myelodactylus
  - †Myelodactylus keyserensis
- †Mylacris – type locality for genus
  - †Mylacris virginiana – type locality for species

== N ==
- †Naiadites
- †Naticonema
- †Nematophyllum
  - †Nematophyllum angustum
- †Nervostrophia
  - †Nervostrophia nervosa
- †Neuralethopteris
  - †Neuralethopteris pocahontas
  - †Neuralethopteris smithsii
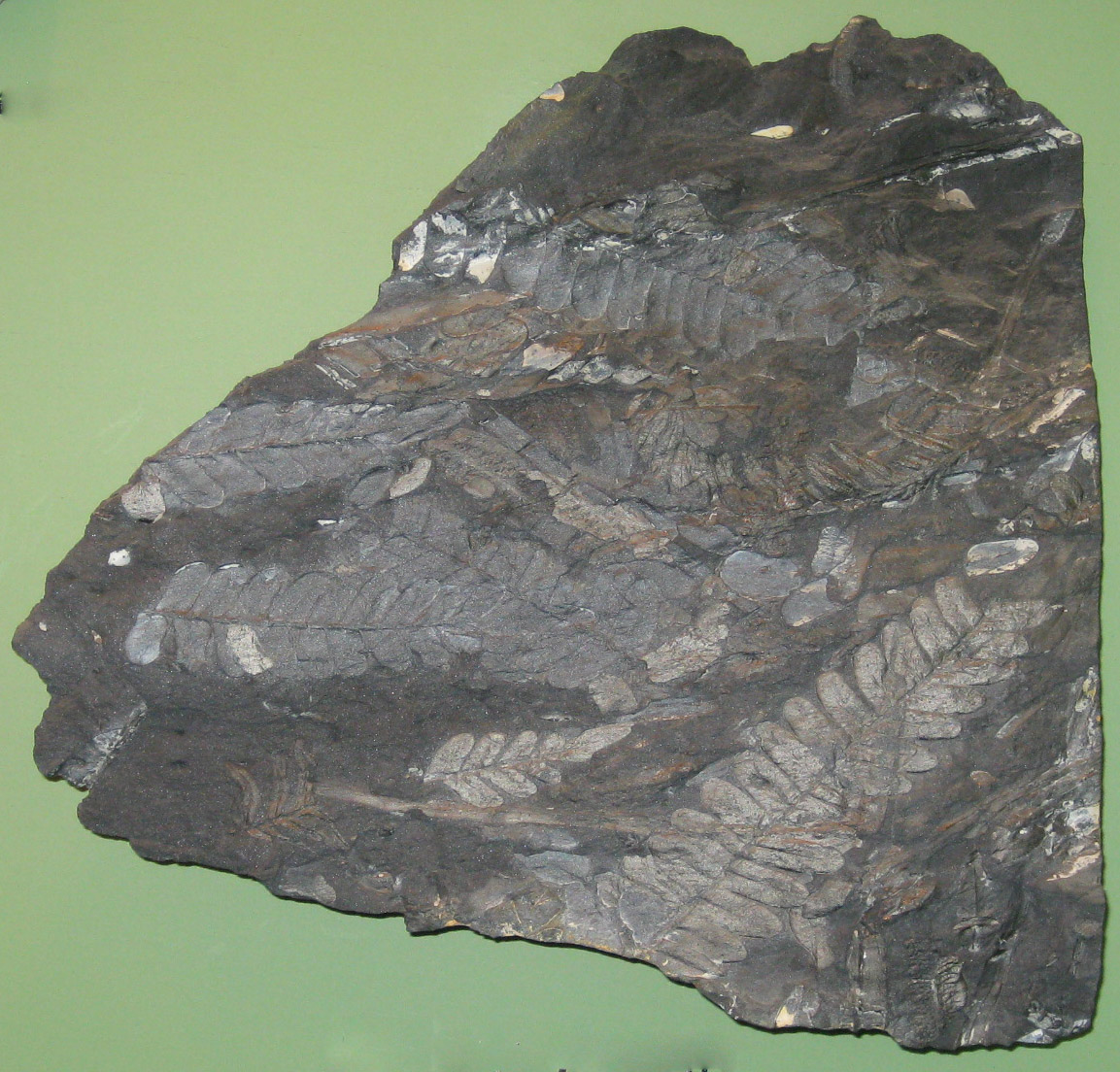
- Fronds of the Carboniferous seed fern Neuropteris
  †Neuropteris
  - †Neuropteris agassizi
  - †Neuropteris auriculata
  - †Neuropteris biformis
  - †Neuropteris callosa
  - †Neuropteris carrii – or unidentified comparable form
  - †Neuropteris cistii
  - †Neuropteris cordata
  - †Neuropteris crenulata
  - †Neuropteris dictyopteroides
  - †Neuropteris elrodi
  - †Neuropteris fimbriata
  - †Neuropteris flexuosa
  - †Neuropteris gigantea
  - †Neuropteris grangeri
  - †Neuropteris heterophylla
  - †Neuropteris lindleyana
  - †Neuropteris loschii
  - †Neuropteris odontopteroides
  - †Neuropteris ovata
  - †Neuropteris planchardi
    - †Neuropteris planchardi var. longifolia
  - †Neuropteris plicata
  - †Neuropteris pocahontas
  - †Neuropteris rarinervis
  - †Neuropteris scheuchzeri
  - †Neuropteris schlehani
  - †Neuropteris smithii
  - †Neuropteris sternberg
  - †Neuropteris tenuifolia
  - †Neuropteris vermicularis
  - †Neuropteris zeilleri – or unidentified comparable form
- †Nuculavus
  - †Nuculavus okawensis
- †Nuculopsis
  - †Nuculopsis rectangula

== O ==
- †Octonaria
  - †Octonaria muricata
- †Odontopteris
  - †Odontopteris aequalis
  - †Odontopteris densifolia
  - †Odontopteris gracillima
  - †Odontopteris neuropteroides
  - †Odontopteris nervosa
  - †Odontopteris newberryi
  - †Odontopteris obtusiloba
    - †Odontopteris obtusiloba var. rarinervis
  - †Odontopteris subcuneata
  - †Odontopteris wortheni
- †Oligocarpia
  - †Oligocarpia alabamensis
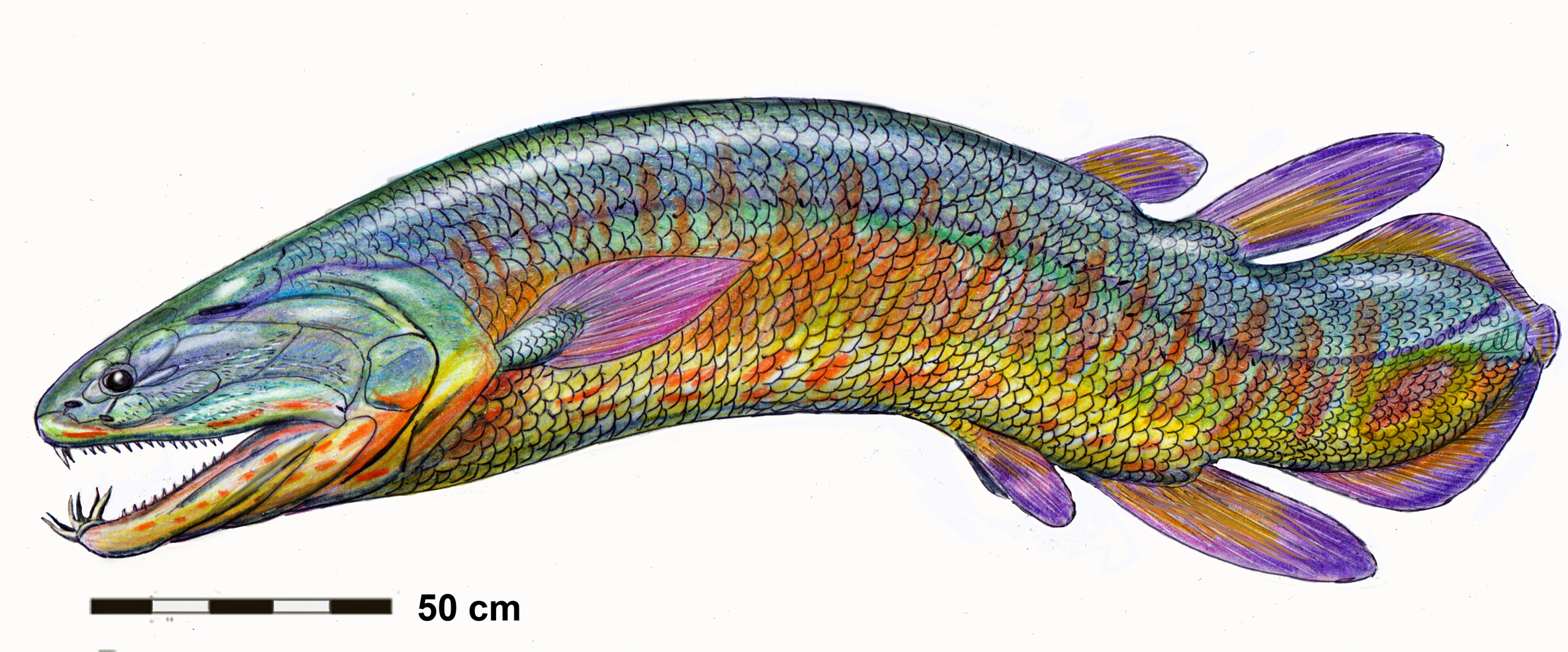
- Life restoration of the Middle-Late Devonian lobe-finned fish Onychodus
  †Onychodus
- †Orthacanthus – or unidentified comparable form
- †Orthoceras – report made of unidentified related form or using admittedly obsolete nomenclature
- †Orthogonophora – type locality for genus
  - †Orthogonophora distincta – type locality for species
- †Orthomylacris
  - †Orthomylacris franklini – type locality for species
- †Orthonychia
  - †Orthonychia tortuosa
- †Oxynoblatta
  - †Oxynoblatta alutacea – type locality for species

== P ==
- †Palaeodictyopteron – report made of unidentified related form or using admittedly obsolete nomenclature
  - †Palaeodictyopteron virginianum – type locality for species
- †Palaeolima
- †Palaeoneilo
  - †Palaeoneilo sera
- †Palaeostylus
  - †Palaeostylus venustus
- †Palaeoxyris
  - †Palaeoxyris appendiculata
- †Paleyoldia
  - †Paleyoldia levistriata
- †Paracyclas
  - †Paracyclas lirata
- †Paraechmina
  - †Paraechmina dubia
- †Parahughmilleria
  - †Parahughmilleria bellistriata
- †Parallelodon
  - †Parallelodon mimina
  - †Parallelodon minima – or unidentified comparable form
- †Pareinoblatta
  - †Pareinoblatta expuncta – type locality for species
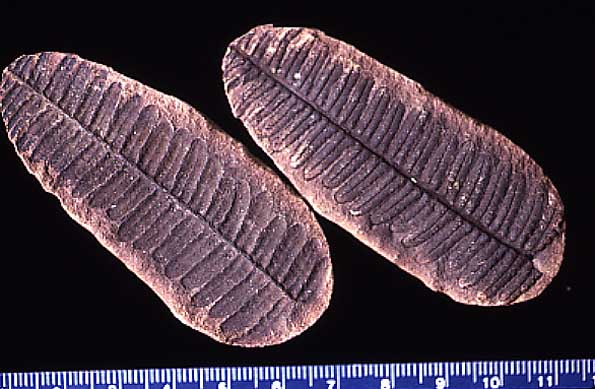
- Fossils of the Late Devonian-Permian fern-like fronds Pecopteris
  †Pecopteris
  - †Pecopteris angustipinna
  - †Pecopteris arborescens
    - †Pecopteris arborescens var. integripinna
  - †Pecopteris arguta
  - †Pecopteris aspera
  - †Pecopteris asplenioides
  - †Pecopteris candolleana
  - †Pecopteris dawsoniana
  - †Pecopteris dentata
    - †Pecopteris dentata var. crenata
    - †Pecopteris dentata var. parva
  - †Pecopteris elegans
  - †Pecopteris elliptica
  - †Pecopteris emarginata
  - †Pecopteris feminaeformis
  - †Pecopteris germari
    - †Pecopteris germari var. crassinervis
    - †Pecopteris germari var. cuspidata
  - †Pecopteris goniopteroides
  - †Pecopteris grandifolia
  - †Pecopteris hemitelioides
  - †Pecopteris hemiteloides
  - †Pecopteris heeriana
  - †Pecopteris imbricata
  - †Pecopteris inclinata
  - †Pecopteris integra – or unidentified comparable form
  - †Pecopteris jenneyi – or unidentified comparable form
  - †Pecopteris lanceolata
  - †Pecopteris latifolia
  - †Pecopteris longifolia
  - †Pecopteris merianiopteroides
  - †Pecopteris microphylla
  - †Pecopteris miltoni
  - †Pecopteris newberryana
  - †Pecopteris nodosa
  - †Pecopteris notata
  - †Pecopteris oblonga
  - †Pecopteris oblongifolia
  - †Pecopteris odontopteroides
  - †Pecopteris oreopteridia
  - †Pecopteris ovoides
  - †Pecopteris pachypteroides
  - †Pecopteris pennaeformis
    - †Pecopteris pennaeformis var. latifolia
  - †Pecopteris platynervis
  - †Pecopteris pluckeneti
    - †Pecopteris pluckeneti var. constricta
  - †Pecopteris plumosa
  - †Pecopteris polymorpha
  - †Pecopteris pteroides
  - †Pecopteris rarinervis
  - †Pecopteris rotundifolia
  - †Pecopteris rotundiloba
  - †Pecopteris schimperiana
  - †Pecopteris serrulata – tentative report
  - †Pecopteris sub-falcata
  - †Pecopteris tenuinervis
  - †Pecopteris unita
  - †Pecopteris vestita
  - †Pecopteris villosa
- †Penetoblatta
  - †Penetoblatta rotundata – type locality for species
  - †Penetoblatta virginiensis – type locality for species
- †Periechocrinus
- †Permophorus
  - †Permophorus octocostatus
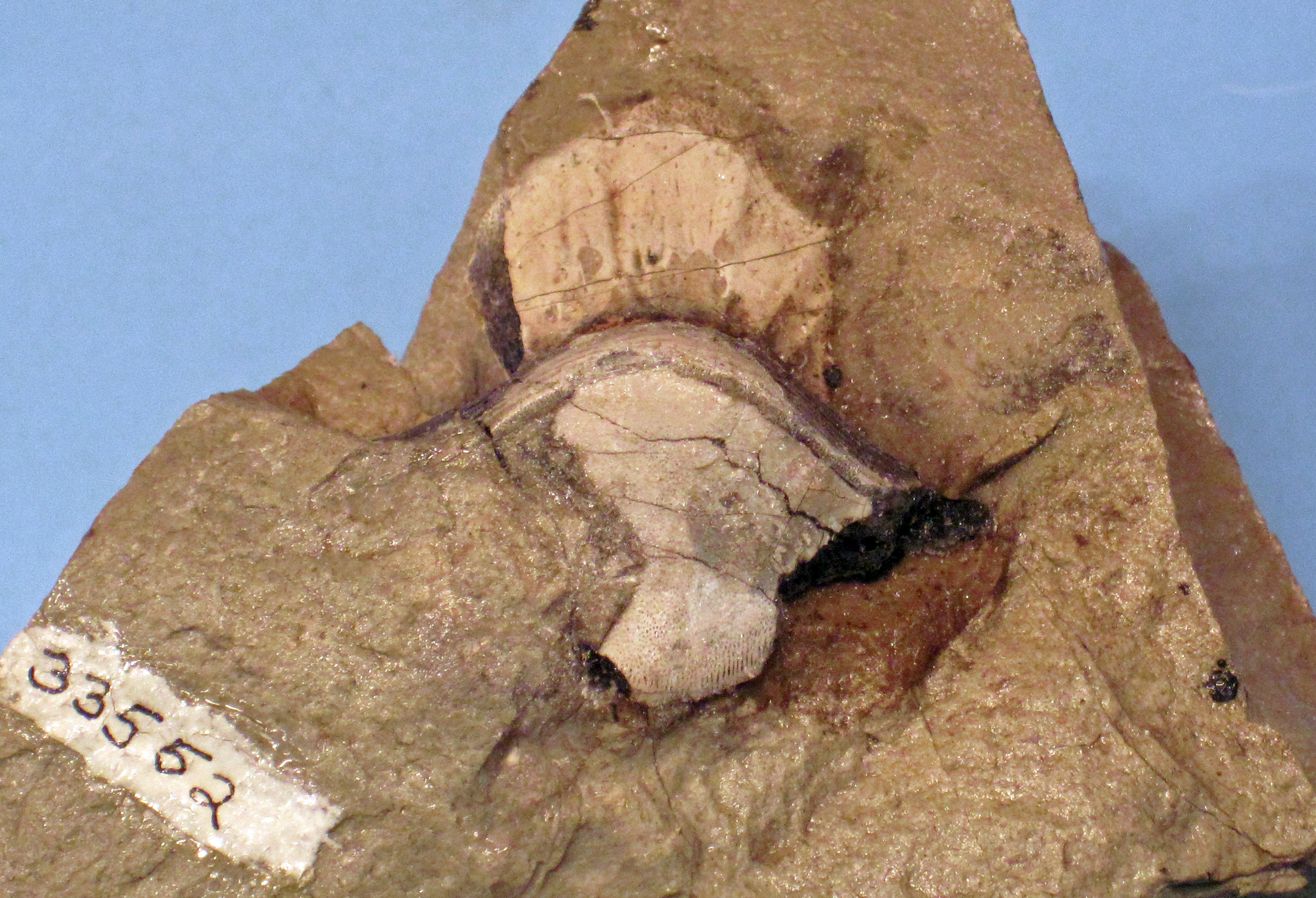
- Fossilized tooth of the Carboniferous-Permian shark Petalodus
  †Petalodus
- †Petrablattina
  - †Petrablattina ovata – type locality for species
- †Phacops
  - †Phacops cristata
- †Phestia
  - †Phestia pandoraeformis
  - †Phestia rugodorsata
- †Phyloblatta
  - †Phyloblatta abbreviata – type locality for species
  - †Phyloblatta abdicata – type locality for species
  - †Phyloblatta accubita – type locality for species
  - †Phyloblatta angusta – type locality for species
  - †Phyloblatta arcuata – type locality for species
  - †Phyloblatta cassvilleana – type locality for species
  - †Phyloblatta communis – type locality for species
  - †Phyloblatta concinna – type locality for species
  - †Phyloblatta debilis – type locality for species
  - †Phyloblatta deducta – type locality for species
  - †Phyloblatta dichotoma – type locality for species
  - †Phyloblatta dimidiata – type locality for species
  - †Phyloblatta elatior – type locality for species
  - †Phyloblatta expugnata – type locality for species
  - †Phyloblatta expulsata – type locality for species
  - †Phyloblatta exsecuta – type locality for species
  - †Phyloblatta fracta – type locality for species
  - †Phyloblatta funeraria – type locality for species
  - †Phyloblatta gratiosa – type locality for species
  - †Phyloblatta immolata – type locality for species
  - †Phyloblatta imperfecta – type locality for species
  - †Phyloblatta lata – type locality for species
  - †Phyloblatta macerata – type locality for species
  - †Phyloblatta macilenta – type locality for species
  - †Phyloblatta macroptera – type locality for species
  - †Phyloblatta mactata – type locality for species
  - †Phyloblatta mortua – type locality for species
  - †Phyloblatta obatra – type locality for species
  - †Phyloblatta praedulcis – type locality for species
  - †Phyloblatta rebaptizata – type locality for species
  - †Phyloblatta regularis – type locality for species
  - †Phyloblatta residua – type locality for species
  - †Phyloblatta rogi – type locality for species
  - †Phyloblatta scudderiana – type locality for species
  - †Phyloblatta secreta – type locality for species
  - †Phyloblatta uniformis – type locality for species
  - †Phyloblatta virginiana – type locality for species
  - †Phyloblatta vulgata – type locality for species
- †Physonemus
- †Pinna
  - †Pinna missouriensis
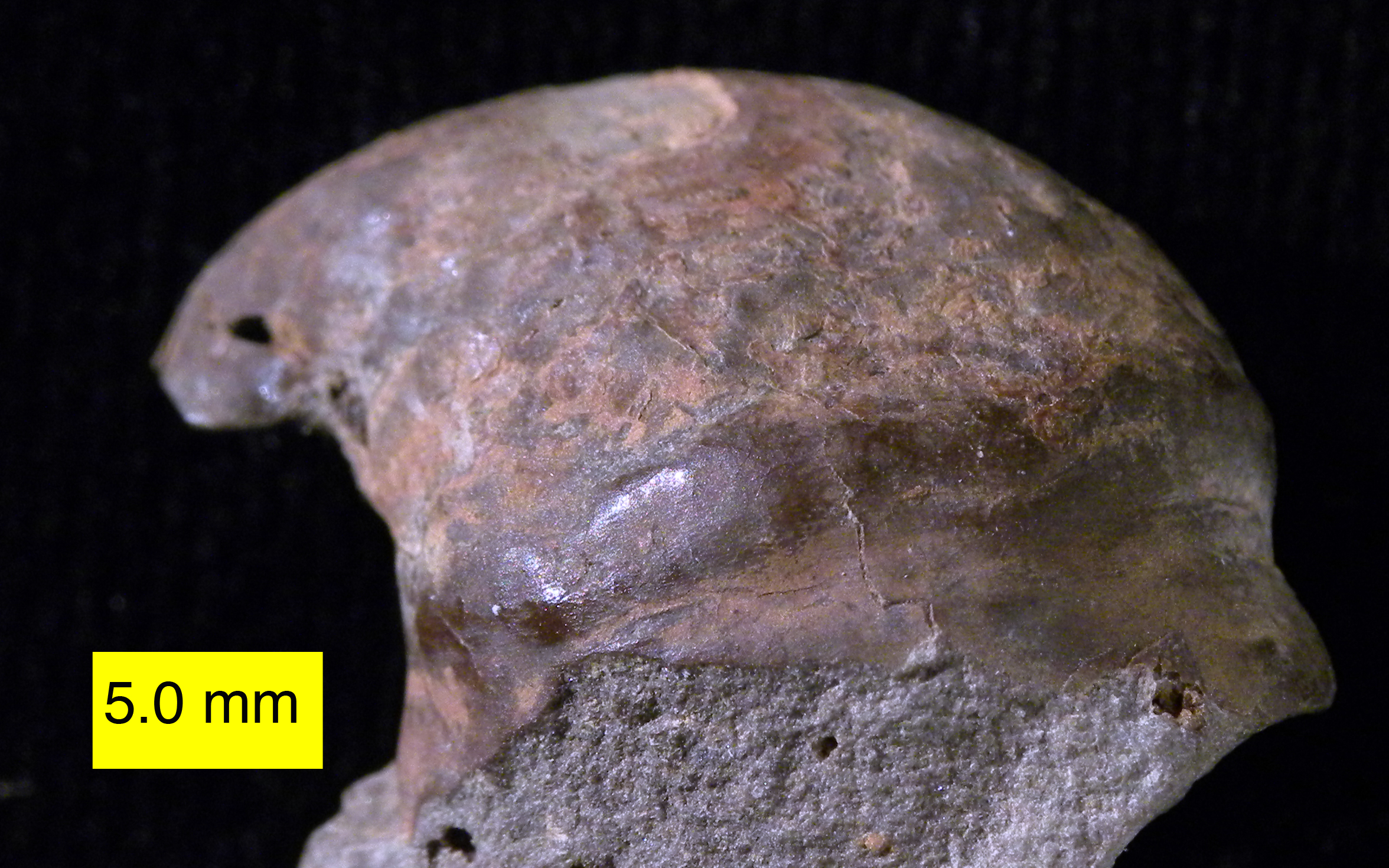
- Fossilized shell of the Silurian-Early Triassic sea snail Platyceras
  †Platyceras
  - †Platyceras gebharti
  - †Platyceras magnificum
- †Plocezyga
  - †Plocezyga acuminata
  - †Plocezyga obscura – type locality for species
  - †Plocezyga subquadrata – type locality for species
  - †Plocezyga turbinata
- †Poacordaites
- †Polidevcia
  - †Polidevcia stevensiana
- †Polyetoblatta – type locality for genus
  - †Polyetoblatta calopteryx – type locality for species
- †Ponderodictya
  - †Ponderodictya favulosa
- †Poroblattina
  - †Poroblattina gratiosa – type locality for species
  - †Poroblattina parvula – type locality for species
- †Productella
  - †Productella rectispina
- †Promytilus
  - †Promytilus illinoisensis
- †Protathyris
  - †Protathyris congregata
- †Protaxocrinus
- †Proterogyrinus
  - †Proterogyrinus scheelei
- †Prothyris
  - †Prothyris acuticarinata – type locality for species
- †Protoleptostrophia
  - †Protoleptostrophia perplana
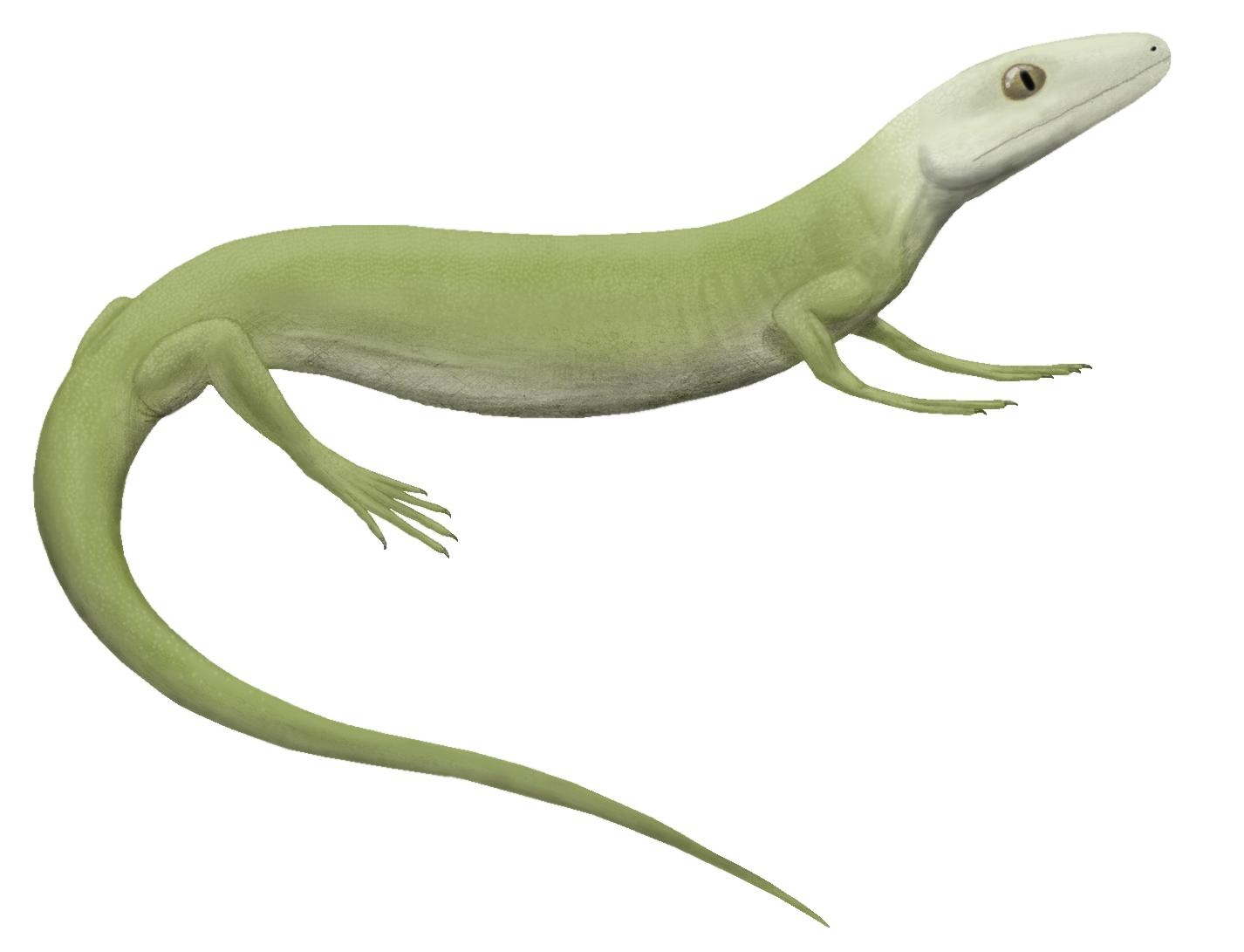
- Life restoration of the Permian reptile Protorothyris
  †Protorothyris – type locality for genus
  - †Protorothyris morani – type locality for species
- †Pseudocrinites
- †Pseudozygopleura
  - †Pseudozygopleura multicostata – or unidentified comparable form
  - †Pseudozygopleura pandus
  - †Pseudozygopleura schucherti – or unidentified comparable form
  - †Pseudozygopleura scitula
  - †Pseudozygopleura tenuivirga
- †Pterinea
  - †Pterinea emacerata – or unidentified comparable form
  - †Pterinea flintstonensis
- †Ptychopteria
  - †Ptychopteria pusilla – type locality for species
- †Pustulatia
  - †Pustulatia pustulosa
- †Pycnosaccus

== R ==
- †Rafinesquina
- †Resserella
  - †Resserella elegantula
- †Rhabdocarpos
  - †Rhabdocarpos amygdalaeformis
  - †Rhabdocarpos bockschianus
  - †Rhabdocarpos multistriatus
  - †Rhabdocarpos oblongatus
  - †Rhabdocarpos sulcatus
  - †Rhabdocarpos tenax
- †Rhacophyton
  - †Rhacophyton ceratangium
- †Rhipidomella
  - †Rhipidomella hybrida
  - †Rhipidomella leucosia – or unidentified comparable form
  - †Rhipidomella penelope – or unidentified comparable form
  - †Rhipidomella vanuxemi
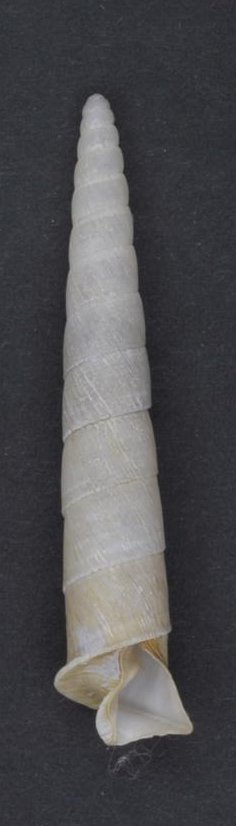
- Shell of a Rhodea land snail
  †Rhodea
  - †Rhodea vepertina – type locality for species
- †Rhynchospirina
  - †Rhynchospirina globosa
- †Rodea (genus)
  - †Rodea vespertina – type locality for species

== S ==
- †Sagenodus – or unidentified comparable form
- †Sanguinolites
  - †Sanguinolites naiadiformis – or unidentified comparable form
  - †Sanguinolites obliquus – or unidentified comparable form
  - †Sanguinolites unioniformis – or unidentified comparable form
- †Saportaea
  - †Saportaea grandifolia
  - †Saportaea salisburioides
- †Schellwienella
  - †Schellwienella elegans
  - †Schellwienella interstriata
  - †Schellwienella rugosa
- †Schizodus
  - †Schizodus chesterensis – or unidentified related form
  - †Schizodus depressus
- †Schizophoria
  - †Schizophoria impressa
- †Schuchertella
  - †Schuchertella deckerensis
  - †Schuchertella variabilis
- †Scudderula
  - †Scudderula arcta – type locality for species
- †Scyphocrinites
- †Sedgwickia – tentative report
- †Septimyalina
- †Shenophyllum
  - †Shenophyllum cunefolium
  - †Shenophyllum tenerrimum
- †Shenopteris
  - †Shenopteris elegans
  - †Shenopteris launoitii
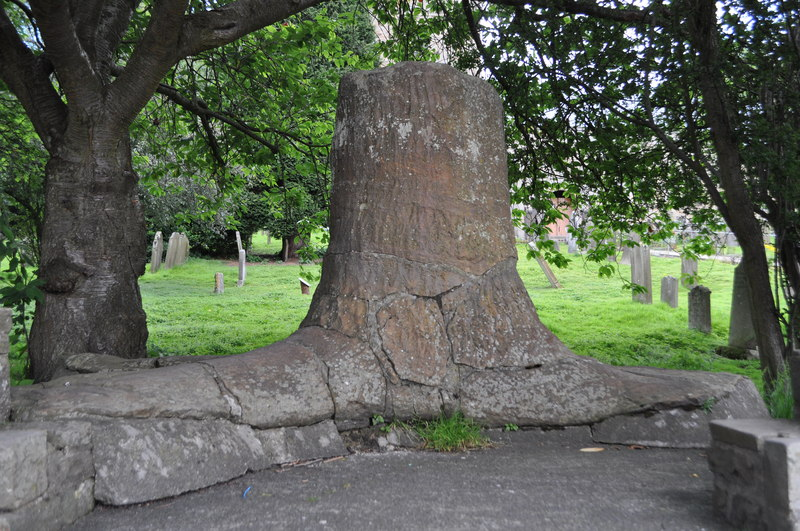
- Fossilized stump of the Carboniferous-Permian club moss relative Sigillaria
  †Sigillaria
  - †Sigillaria approximata
  - †Sigillaria brardii
  - †Sigillaria camptotaenia
  - †Sigillaria dentata – or unidentified comparable form
  - †Sigillaria fissa
  - †Sigillaria ichthyolepis – or unidentified comparable form
  - †Sigillaria reticulata – or unidentified comparable form
  - †Sigillaria menardi
- †Solenomorpha
  - †Solenomorpha nitida
- †Sphaerocystites
- †Sphaerotocrinus
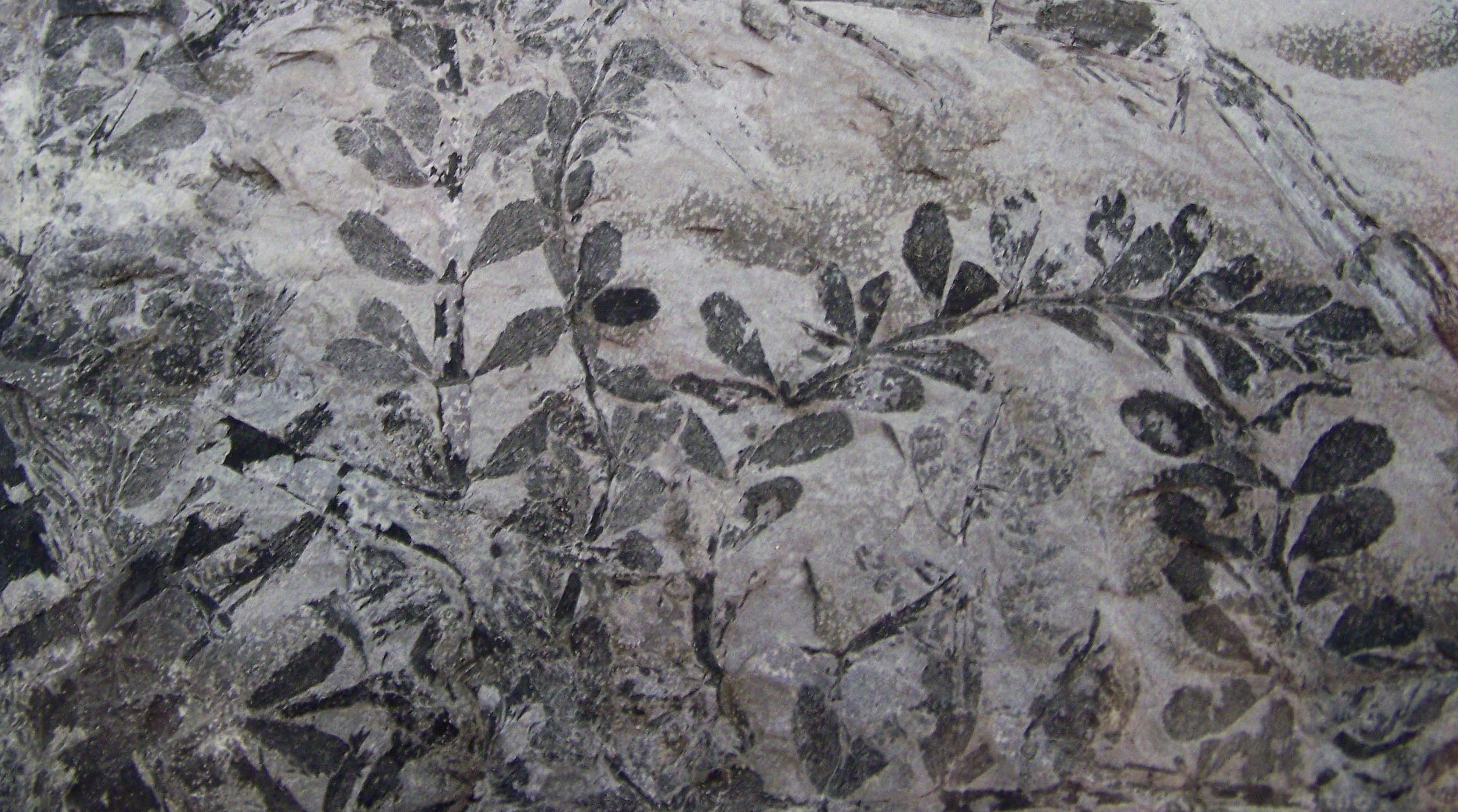
- Fossilized leaves and branches of the Devonian-Triassic horsetail relative Sphenophyllum
  †Sphenophyllum
  - †Sphenophyllum angustifolium
  - †Sphenophyllum antiquum
  - †Sphenophyllum cornutum
  - †Sphenophyllum cuneifolium
  - †Sphenophyllum densifolium
  - †Sphenophyllum emarginatum
  - †Sphenophyllum filiculme
  - †Sphenophyllum fontaineaum
  - †Sphenophyllum furcatum
  - †Sphenophyllum lescurianum
  - †Sphenophyllum longifolium
  - †Sphenophyllum majus
  - †Sphenophyllum oblongifolia
  - †Sphenophyllum oblongifolium
  - †Sphenophyllum subtenerrimmum
  - †Sphenophyllum tenue
  - †Sphenophyllum tenuifolium
- †Sphenopteridium
  - †Sphenopteridium bifidum
  - †Sphenopteridium brooksi – type locality for species
  - †Sphenopteridium girtiyi – type locality for species
  - †Sphenopteridium virginianum
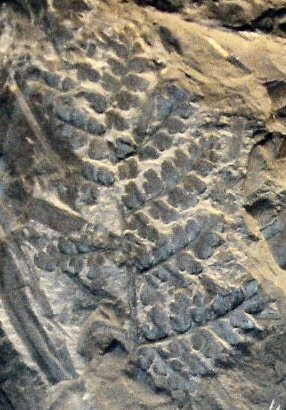
- Fossilized foliage of the Late-Devonian-Cretaceous seed fern Sphenopteris
  †Sphenopteris
  - †Sphenopteris acrocarpa
  - †Sphenopteris auriculata
  - †Sphenopteris breviloba
  - †Sphenopteris broadheadi – or unidentified comparable form
  - †Sphenopteris canneltonensis – or unidentified comparable form
  - †Sphenopteris chaerophylloides
  - †Sphenopteris communis
  - †Sphenopteris deliculata
  - †Sphenopteris dentata
  - †Sphenopteris dicksonioides
  - †Sphenopteris distans
  - †Sphenopteris divaricata
  - †Sphenopteris dubuissonis – or unidentified comparable form
  - †Sphenopteris elegans
  - †Sphenopteris flexicaulis
  - †Sphenopteris foliosa
  - †Sphenopteris formosa
  - †Sphenopteris furcata
  - †Sphenopteris goepperti – or unidentified comparable form
  - †Sphenopteris hastata
  - †Sphenopteris hymenophylloides
  - †Sphenopteris hoeninghausii
  - †Sphenopteris karwinensis
  - †Sphenopteris larischii – or unidentified comparable form
  - †Sphenopteris lescuriana
  - †Sphenopteris linearis – or unidentified comparable form
  - †Sphenopteris linkii
  - †Sphenopteris lobata
  - †Sphenopteris microcarpa
  - †Sphenopteris minuti-secta
  - †Sphenopteris mixta
  - †Sphenopteris obtusiloba
  - †Sphenopteris ophioglossoides
  - †Sphenopteris pachynervis
  - †Sphenopteris patentissima
  - †Sphenopteris pinnatifida
  - †Sphenopteris rarinervis
  - †Sphenopteris royi – or unidentified comparable form
  - †Sphenopteris schatzlarensis
  - †Sphenopteris spinosa
  - †Sphenopteris stipulata – or unidentified comparable form
  - †Sphenopteris subgeniculata
  - †Sphenopteris tenella
  - †Sphenopteris tracyana
  - †Sphenopteris trichomanoides – or unidentified comparable form
- †Sphenotus
  - †Sphenotus aeolus – tentative report
  - †Sphenotus monroensis
  - †Sphenotus pisinnus – tentative report
  - †Sphenotus washingtonensis – or unidentified comparable form
- †Spinatrypa
  - †Spinatrypa hystrix
- †Spinocyrtia
  - †Spinocyrtia granulosa
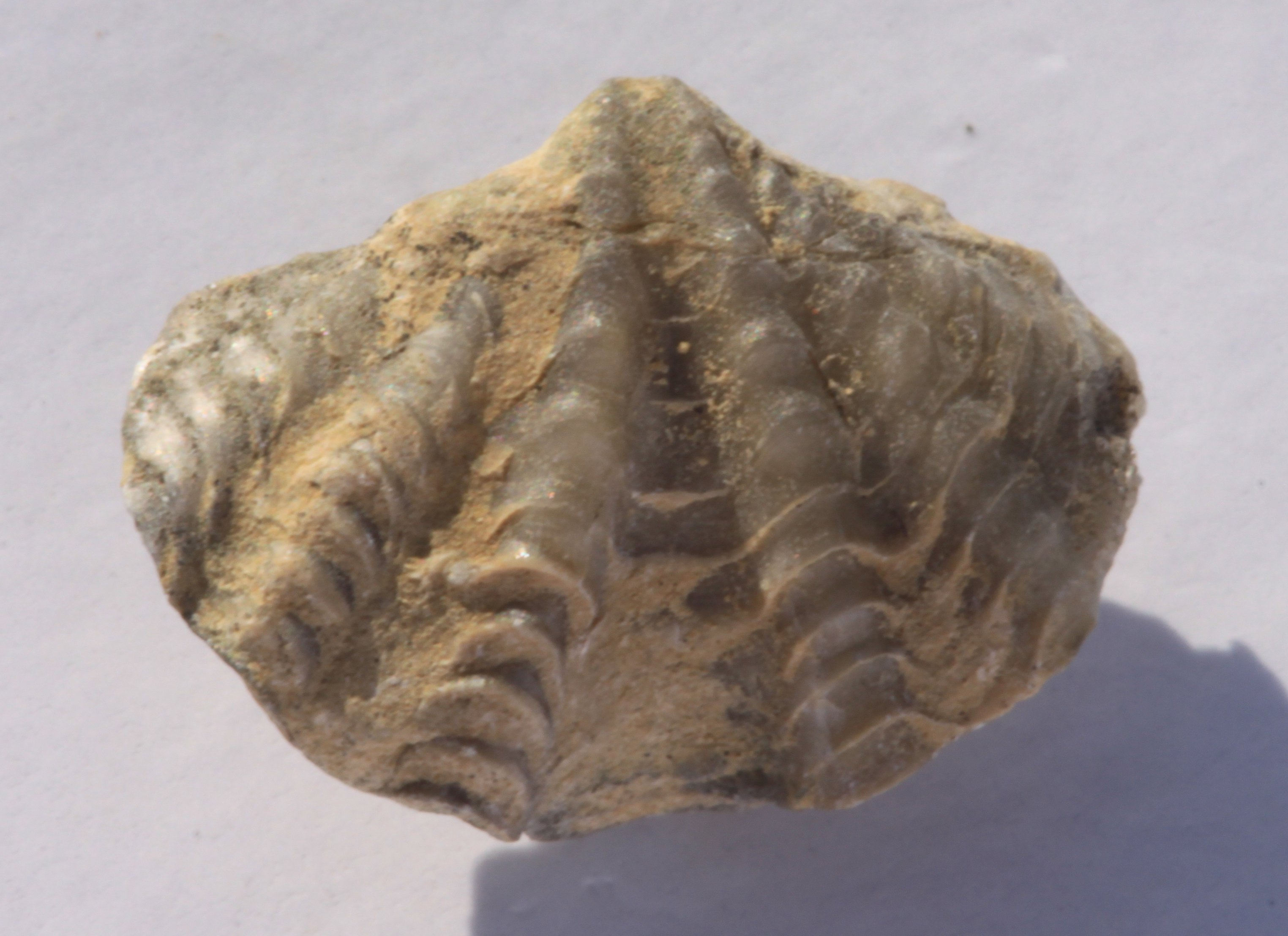
- Fossilized shell of the Late Ordovician-Late Triassic brachiopod Spirifer
  †Spirifer – report made of unidentified related form or using admittedly obsolete nomenclature
  - †Spirifer corallinensis
  - †Spirifer keyserensis
  - †Spirifer mackenzicus
  - †Spirifer vanuxemi
- †Stegerhynchus
  - †Stegerhynchus neglectum
- †Stenochisma
  - †Stenochisma lamellata
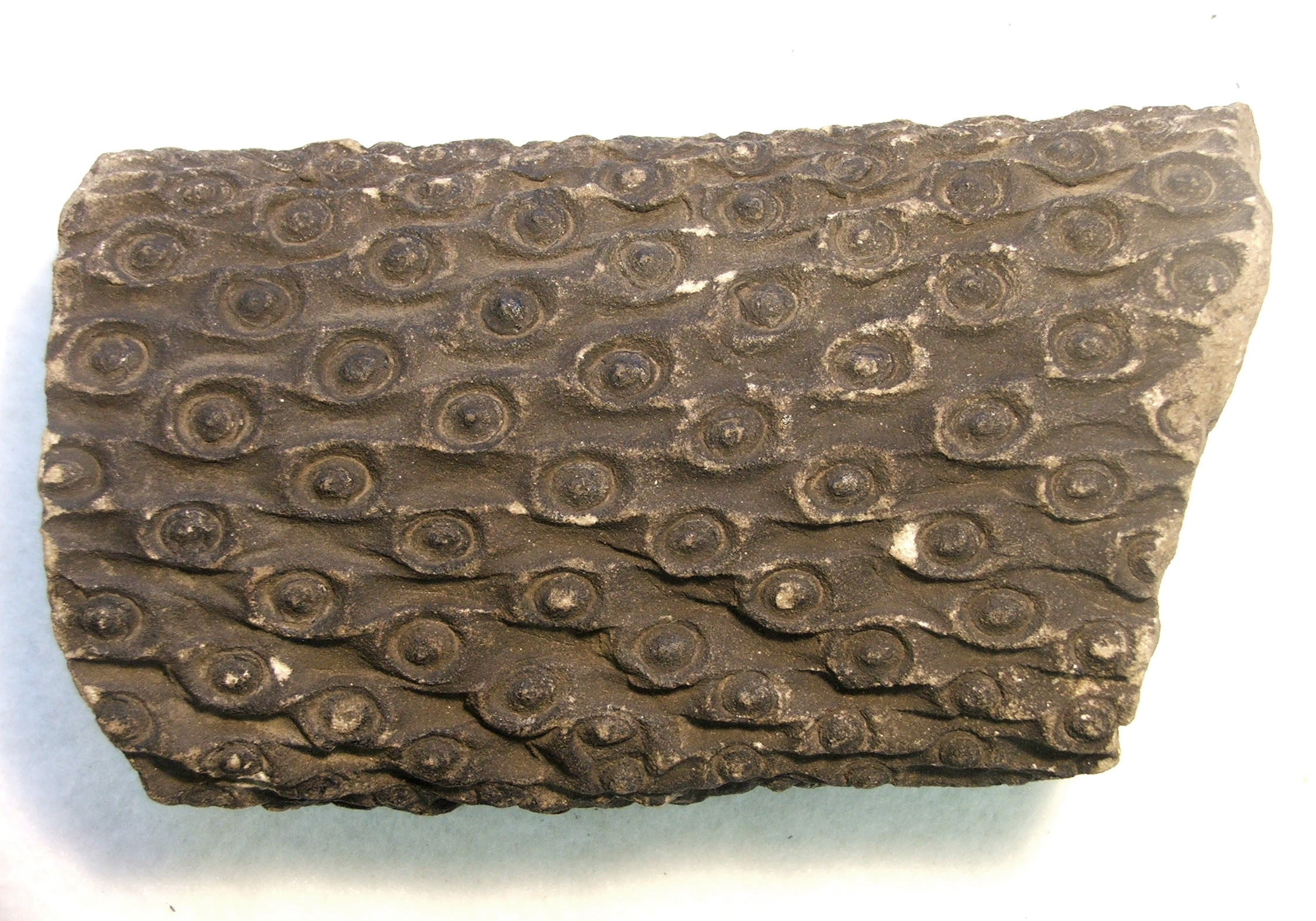
- Fossil of the Carboniferous-Permian tree-like club moss relative rhizome Stigmaria
  †Stigmaria
  - †Stigmaria ficoides
  - †Stigmaria stellata
- †Streblochondria
  - †Streblochondria girtyi
  - †Streblochondria mutata – type locality for species
  - †Streblochondria tiltoni – type locality for species
- †Streblopteria
  - †Streblopteria girtyi – type locality for species
- †Stromatopora
  - †Stromatopora constellata
- †Symphyoblatta
  - †Symphyoblatta debilis – type locality for species
- †Synchirocrinus
  - †Synchirocrinus keyserensis
- †Sysciophlebia
  - †Sysciophlebia balteata – type locality for species
  - †Sysciophlebia invisa – type locality for species
  - †Sysciophlebia patiens – type locality for species
  - †Sysciophlebia recidiva – type locality for species

== T ==
- †Taeniopteris
  - †Taeniopteris lescuriana
  - †Taeniopteris newberriana
    - †Taeniopteris newberriana var. angusta
- †Tanypterichthys – type locality for genus
  - †Tanypterichthys pridensis – type locality for species
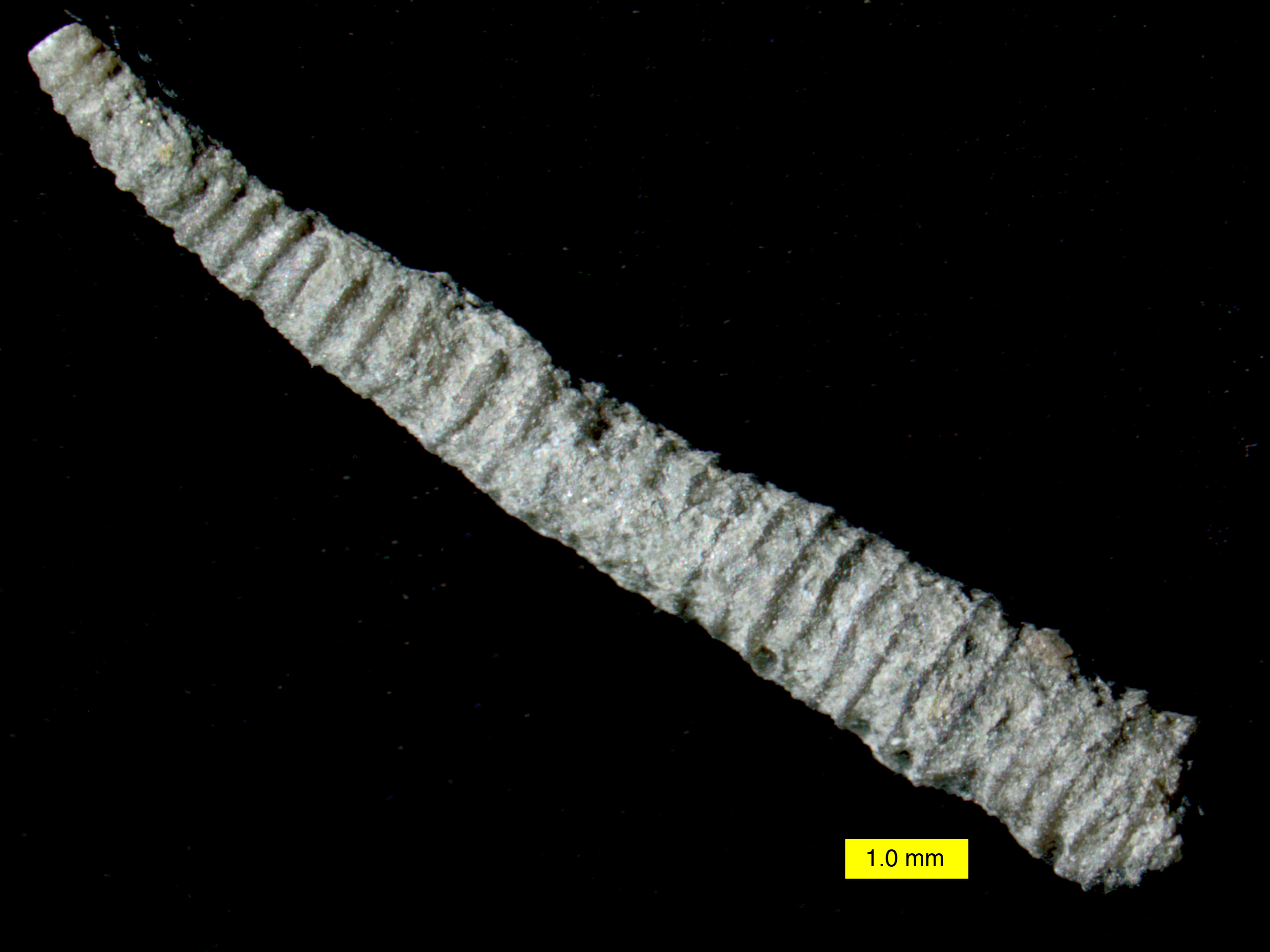
- Fossilized shell of the Early Ordovician-Late Devonian probable mollusc Tentaculites
  †Tentaculites
  - †Tentaculites gyracanthus
  - †Tentaculites minutus
- †Tetracystis
- †Tetrameroceras
  - †Tetrameroceras cumberlandicum
- †Thlipsura
  - †Thlipsura ultimata
- †Thlipsurella
  - †Thlipsurella semipunctata
- †Tradonis
  - †Tradonis castrensis
- †Trigonocarpum
  - †Trigonocarpum ampullaeforme
  - †Trigonocarpum clavatum
  - †Trigonocarpum noeggerathii
  - †Trigonocarpum oliviaeforme
  - †Trigonocarpum trioculare
- †Trigonocarpus
- †Triletes
- †Trimerus
  - †Trimerus delphinocephalus
- †Triphyllopteris
  - †Triphyllopteris latilobata – type locality for species
  - †Triphyllopteris rarinervis – type locality for species
- †Tropidoleptus
  - †Tropidoleptus carinatus
- †Truncatiramus – now regarded as a jr. synonym of Erettopterus
  - †Truncatiramus exopthalmus
- †Tylothyris
  - †Tylothyris mesacostalis

== U ==
- †Ulodendron
  - †Ulodendron majus
- †Uncinulus
  - †Uncinulus convexorus
  - †Uncinulus marylandicus
  - †Uncinulus obtusiplicatus
- †Unicinulus
  - †Unicinulus marylandicus
- †Unklesbayella
  - †Unklesbayella geinitzi

== W ==
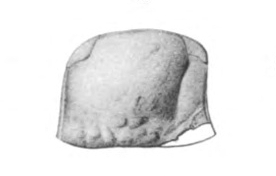
- Fossilized head of the Silurian eurypterid ("sea scorpion") Waeringopterus
  †Waeringopterus
  - †Waeringopterus cumberlandicus
- †Wardia
  - †Wardia fertilis – Later reclassified as †Aneimites fertilis
- †Welleria
  - †Welleria obliqua
- †Whitfieldella
  - †Whitfieldella marylandica
- †Whittleseya
  - †Whittleseya elegans
- †Wilkingia
  - †Wilkingia andrewsi
  - †Wilkingia neglecta – or unidentified related form
  - †Wilkingia walkeri
- †Wurmiella
  - †Wurmiella excavata

== X ==
- †Xenotheca

== Z ==
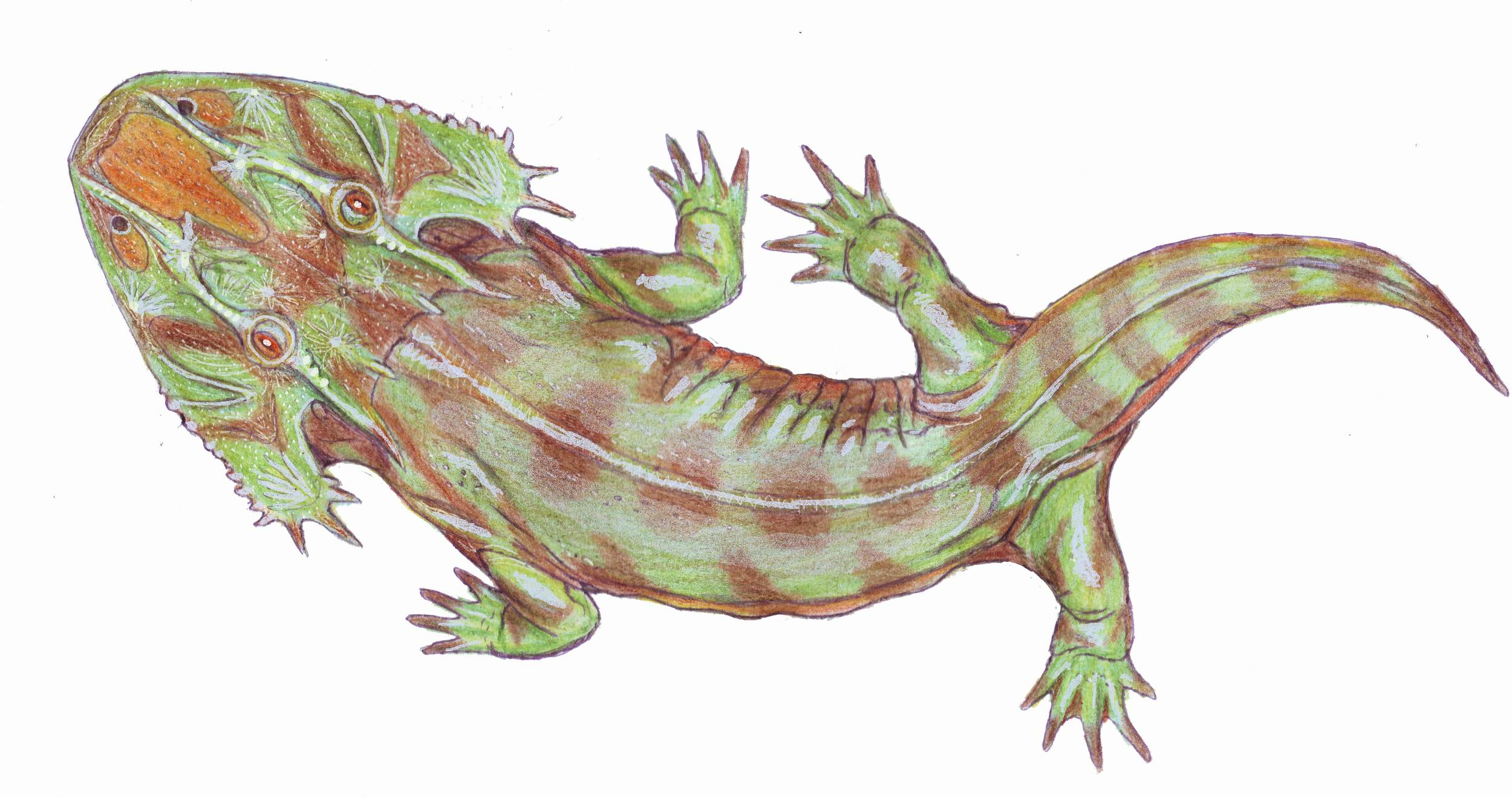
- Life restoration of the Permian amphibian Zatrachys
  †Zatrachys
  - †Zatrachys serratus
- †Zygobeyrichia
  - †Zygobeyrichia incipiens
  - †Zygobeyrichia tonolowayensis
  - †Zygobeyrichia ventricornis
  - †Zygobeyrichia ventripunctata
  - †Zygobeyrichia virginia
- †Zygosella
  - †Zygosella vallata
