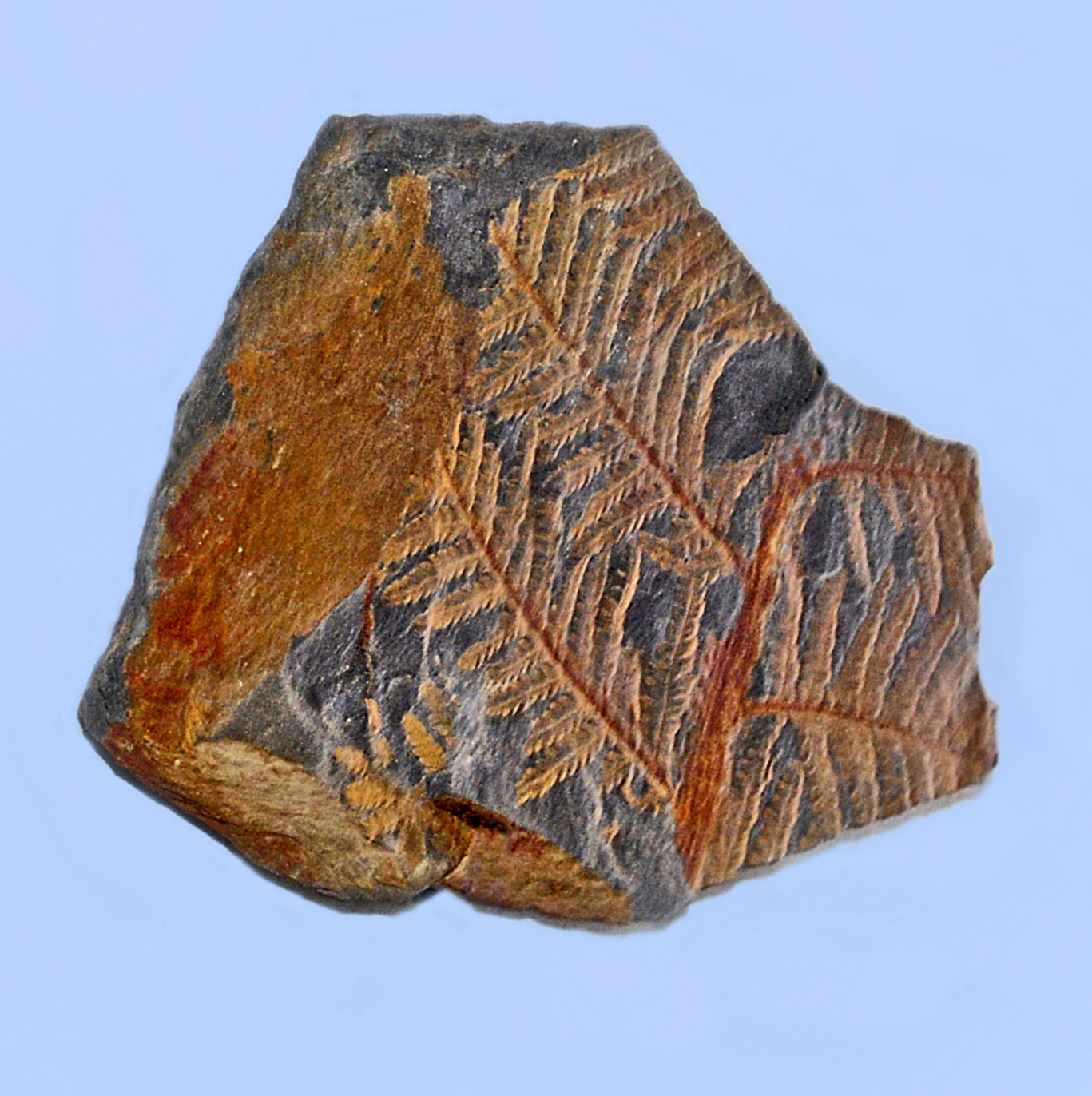
- Fossil of Callipteridium species

Scientific classification
- Kingdom: Plantae
- Clade: Tracheophytes
- Division: †Pteridospermatophyta
- Order: †Medullosales
- Family: †Cyclopteridaceae
- Genus: †Callipteridium; Weiss, 1870

= Callipteridium =

Callipteridium Temporal range: Carboniferous

Extinct genus of plants

Callipteridium is an extinct genus of pteridospermous seed ferns belonging to the family Cyclopteridaceae. These ferns existed in the Carboniferous period.
