= List of the prehistoric life of West Virginia =

This list of the prehistoric life of West Virginia contains the various prehistoric life-forms whose fossilized remains have been reported from within the US state of West Virginia.

== Precambrian ==
The Paleobiology Database records no known occurrences of Precambrian fossils in West Virginia.

== Paleozoic ==
=== Selected Paleozoic taxa of West Virginia ===
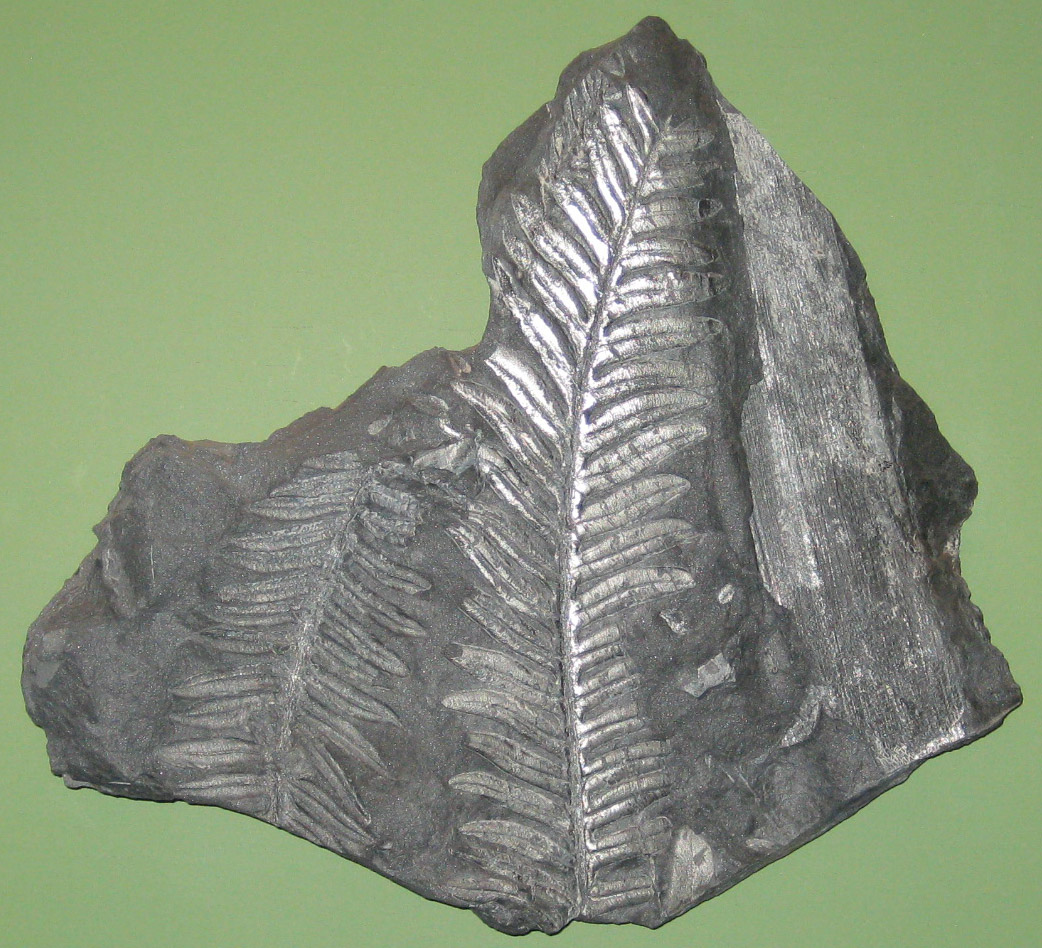
- Fossilized fronds of the Carboniferous-Early Cretaceous seed fern Alethopteris
  †Alethopteris
  - †Alethopteris decurrens
  - †Alethopteris gigas
  - †Alethopteris grandini
  - †Alethopteris parva
  - †Alethopteris serlii
  - †Alethopteris sternberg
  - †Alethopteris virginiana
- †Aneurophyton – or unidentified related form
- †Annularia
  - †Annularia asteris
  - †Annularia galoides
  - †Annularia mucronata
  - †Annularia radiata
  - †Annularia sphenophylloides
  - †Annularia stellata
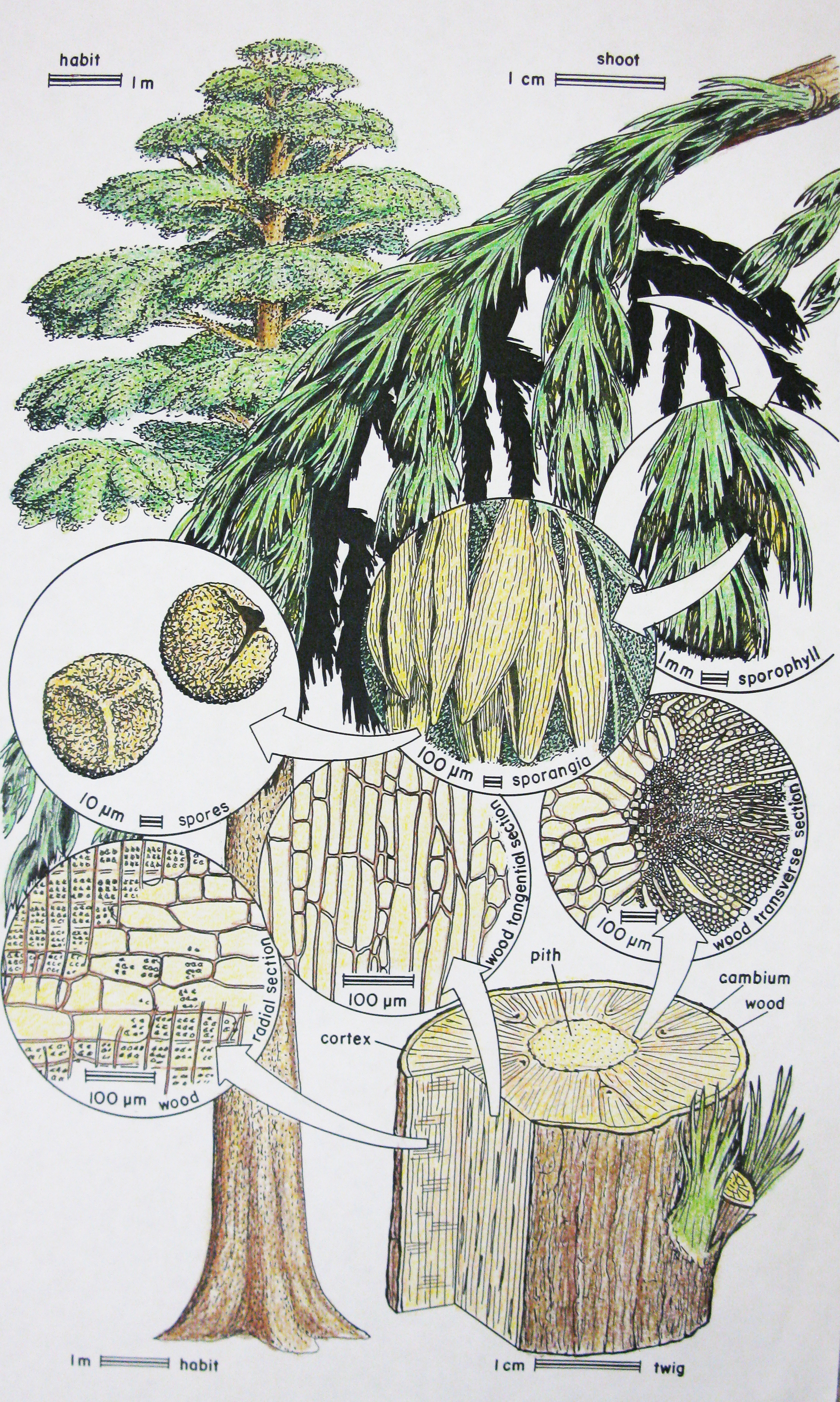
- Restoration of the Late Devonian-Carboniferous tree Archaeopteris with insets detailing its anatomy
  †Archaeopteris
  - †Archaeopteris halliana
  - †Archaeopteris hibernica
  - †Archaeopteris macilenta
  - †Archaeopteris obusa
  - †Archaeopteris sphenophyllifolia
- †Artisia
- †Athyris
- †Atrypa
  - †Atrypa reticularis – report made of unidentified related form or using admittedly obsolete nomenclature
- †Aulopora
- †Aviculopecten
  - †Aviculopecten batesvillensis
  - †Aviculopecten crenistriatus – or unidentified comparable form
- †Baiera
- †Barinophyton
- †Bassipterus
- †Calamites
  - †Calamites cistii
  - †Calamites suckowi
  - †Calamites suckowii
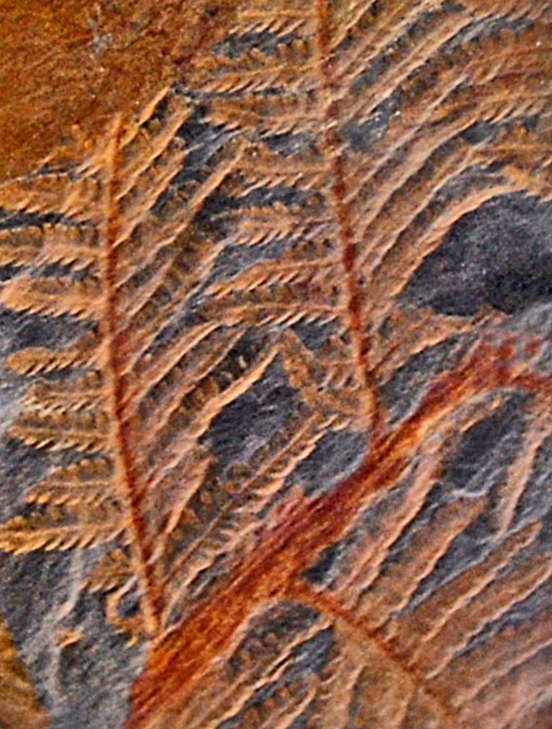
- Fossilized fronds of the Carboniferous seed fern Callipteridium
  †Callipteridium
  - †Callipteridium dawsonianum
  - †Callipteridium grandifolium
  - †Callipteridium oblongifolium
  - †Callipteridium odontopteroides
  - †Callipteridium unitum
- †Callipteris
  - †Callipteris conferta
  - †Callipteris currettiensis
  - †Callipteris diabolica
  - †Callipteris lyratifolia
- †Callixylon
  - †Callixylon erianum
- †Calymene
  - †Calymene camerata
  - †Calymene cresapensis
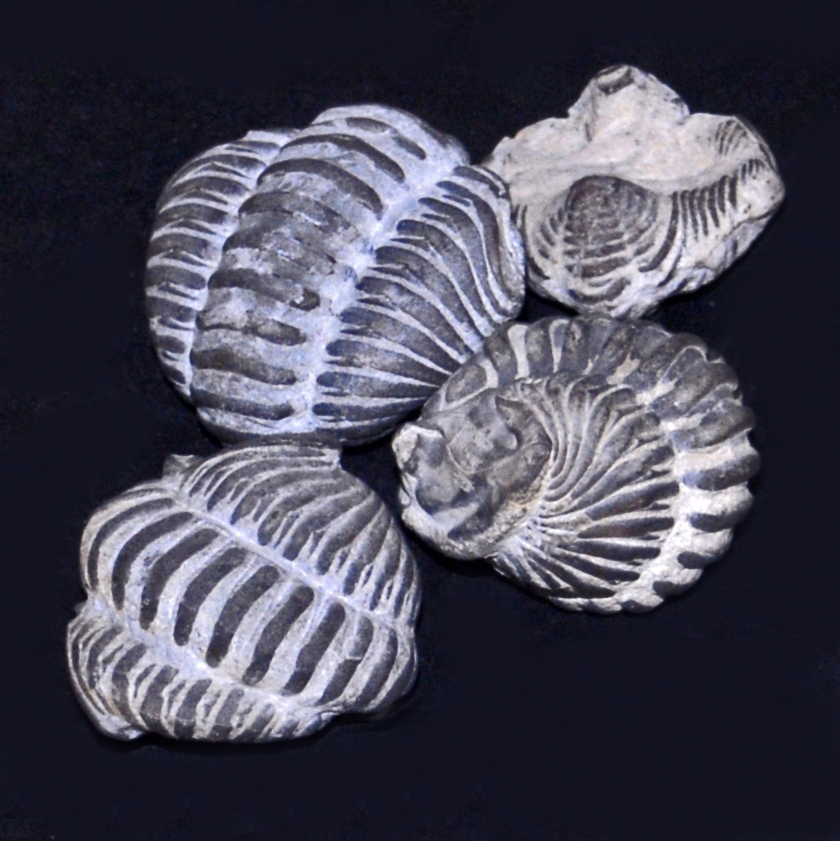
  - Fossils in enrolled posture of the Silurian trilobite Calymene niagarensis
    †Calymene niagarensis
- †Camarotoechia
  - †Camarotoechia andrewsi
  - †Camarotoechia limitare
  - †Camarotoechia litchfieldensis
  - †Camarotoechia tonolowayensis
- †Cardiocarpus
- †Carniodus
- †Chonetes
  - †Chonetes novascoticus
- †Cordaites
  - †Cordaites principalis
- †Cornulites
- †Crassigyrinus
- †Cyclopteris
- †Dalmanites
  - †Dalmanites limulurus
- †Diploceraspis
  - †Diploceraspis burkei
- †Distomodus
- †Drepanopterus
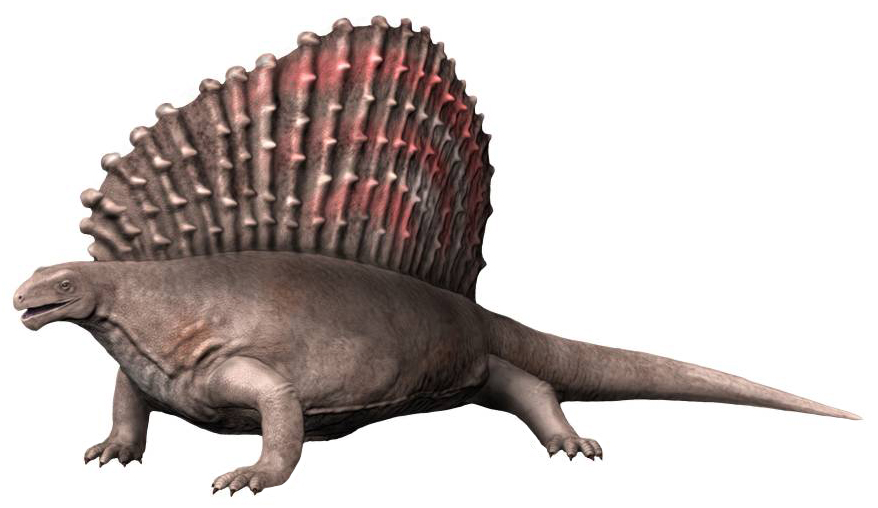
- Life restoration of the Permian synapsid (mammal precursor) Edaphosaurus
  †Edaphosaurus
  - †Edaphosaurus colohistion – type locality for species
- †Edmondia
- †Eucalyptocrinites
- †Eurypterus
- †Favosites
- †Greererpeton
  - †Greererpeton burkemorani
- †Gyracanthus
- †Holopea
- †Hughmilleria
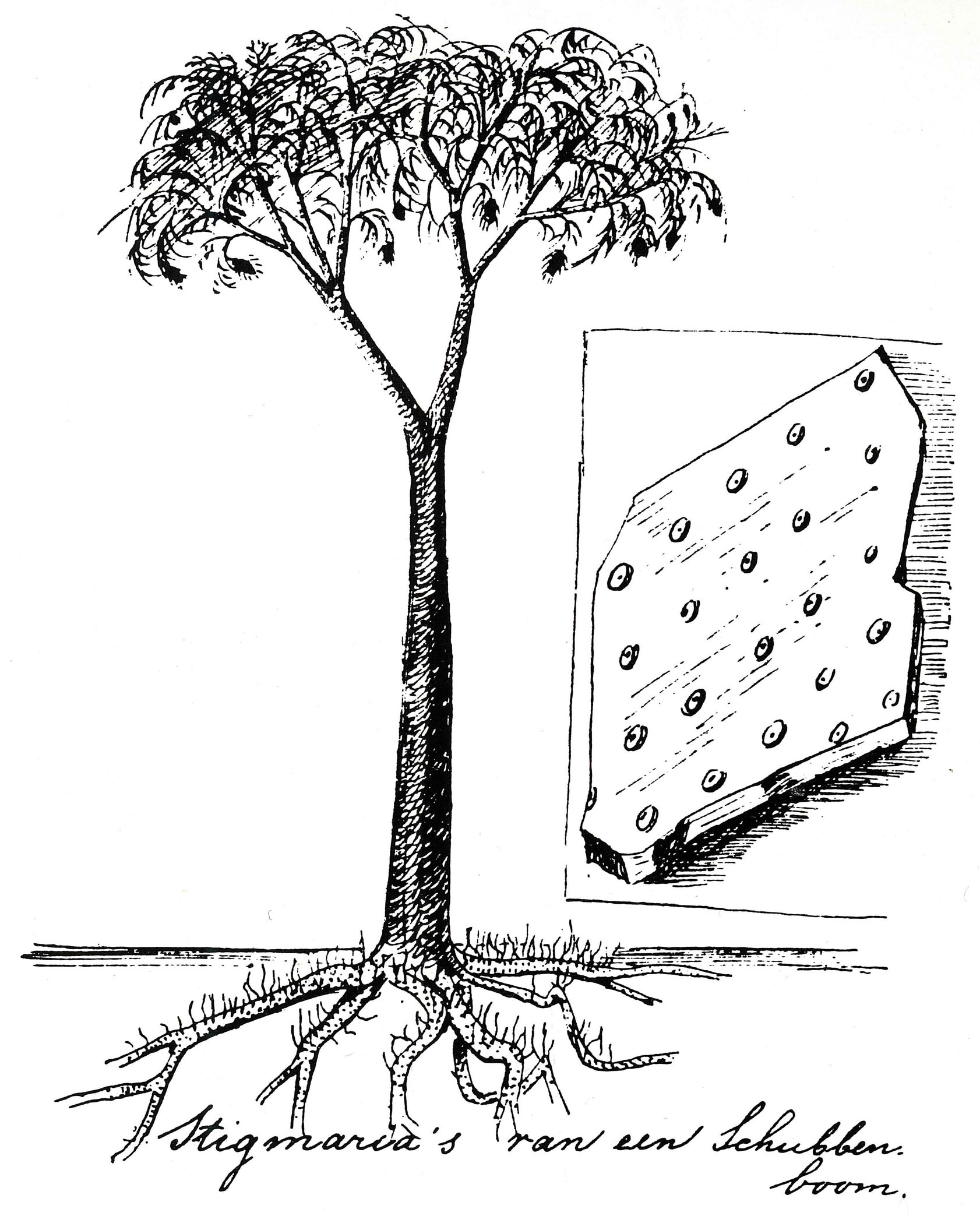
- Restoration of the Carboniferous-Late Triassic club moss relative Lepidodendron. Eli Heimans (1911).
  †Lepidodendron
  - †Lepidodendron aculeatum
  - †Lepidodendron dichotomum
  - †Lepidodendron obovatum
- †Limnopus
  - †Limnopus glenshawensis
- †Lingula
- †Lithostrotion
- †Lyginopteris
  - †Lyginopteris bermudensiformis
  - †Lyginopteris fragilis
  - †Lyginopteris hoeninghausi
- †Modiolus
- †Mucrospirifer
  - †Mucrospirifer mucronatus
- †Murchisonia
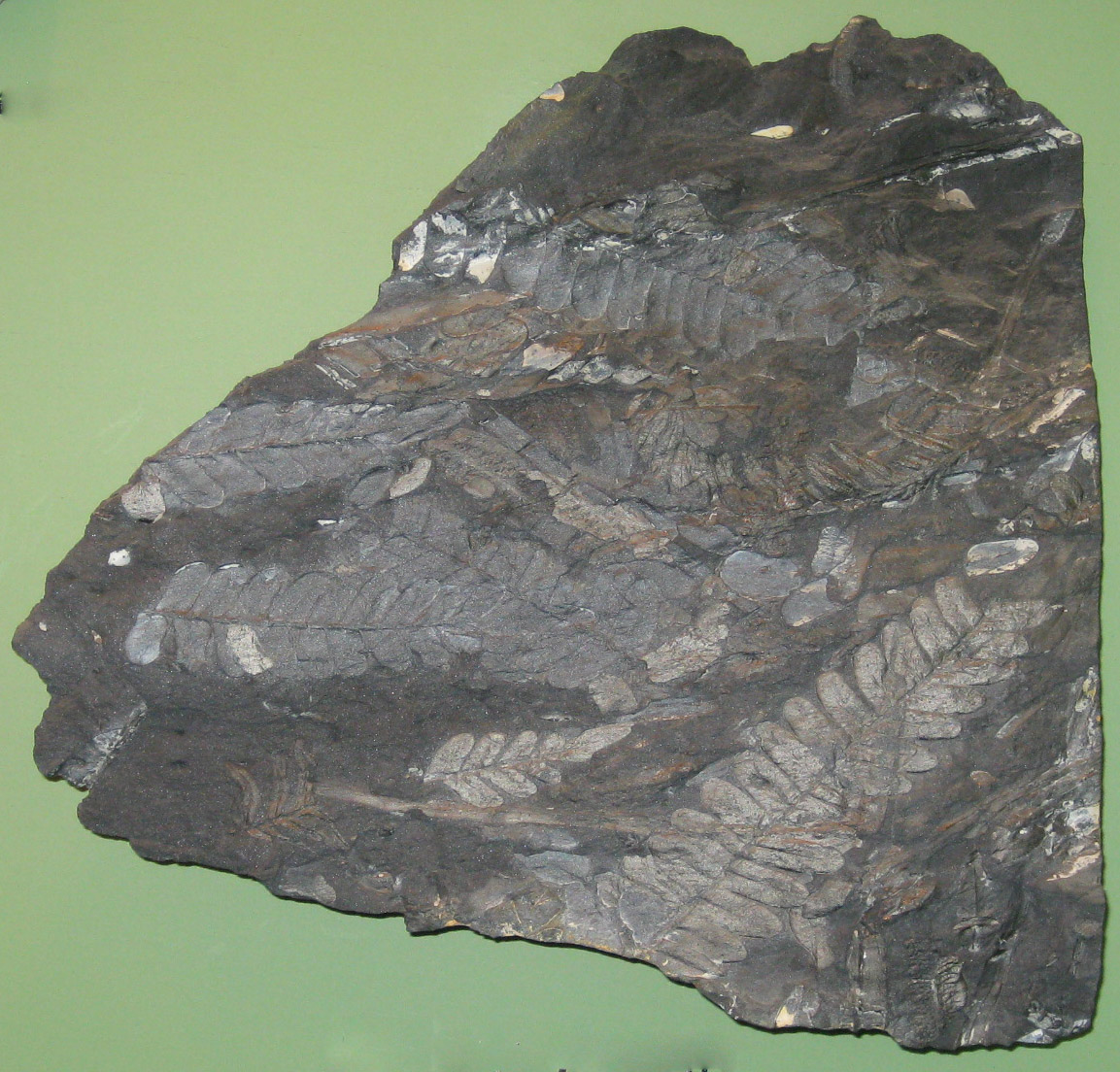
- Fronds of the Carboniferous seed fern Neuropteris
  †Neuropteris
  - †Neuropteris auriculata
  - †Neuropteris cordata
  - †Neuropteris fimbriata
  - †Neuropteris flexuosa
  - †Neuropteris gigantea
  - †Neuropteris heterophylla
  - †Neuropteris hirsuta
  - †Neuropteris loschii
  - †Neuropteris odontopteroides
  - †Neuropteris ovata
  - †Neuropteris scheuchzeri
  - †Neuropteris sternberg
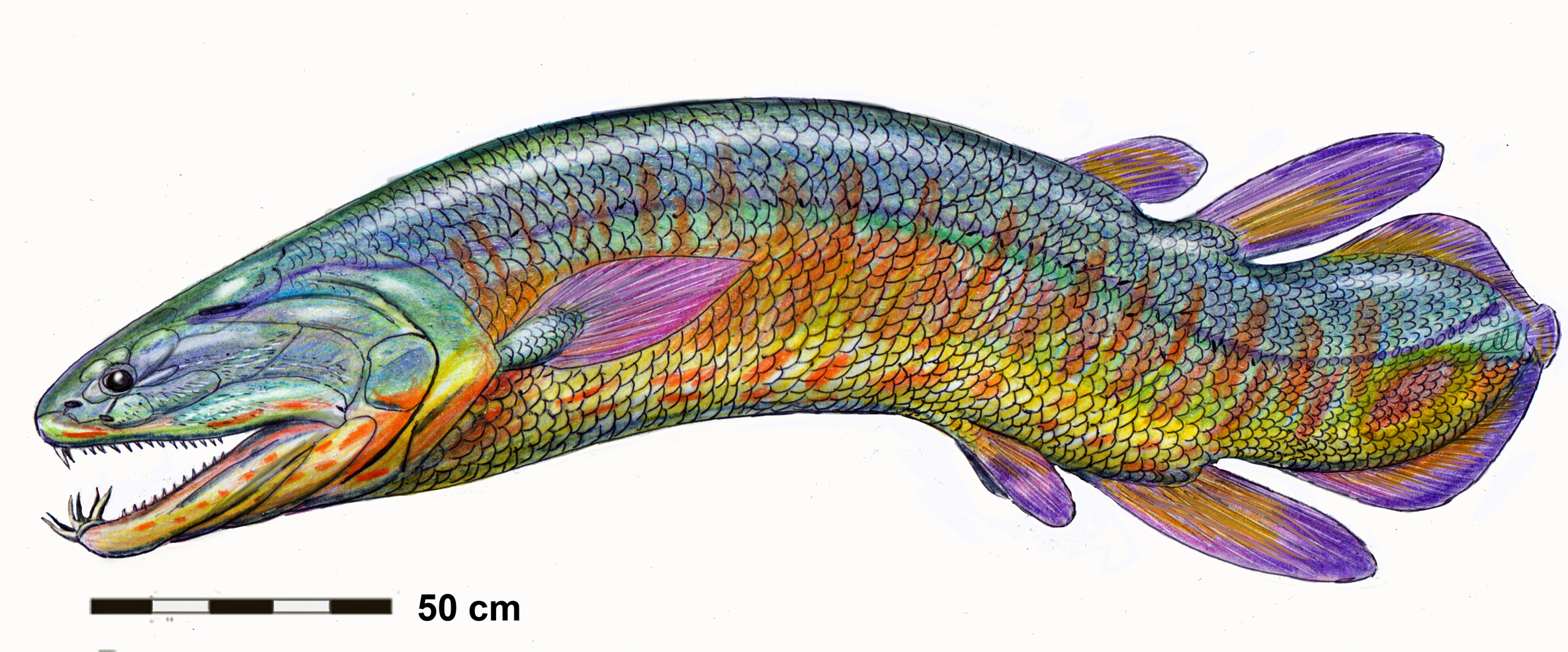
- Life restoration of the Middle-Late Devonian lobe-finned fish Onychodus
  †Onychodus
- †Orthacanthus – or unidentified comparable form
- †Orthoceras – report made of unidentified related form or using admittedly obsolete nomenclature
- †Parahughmilleria
- †Pecopteris
  - †Pecopteris arborescens
  - †Pecopteris elliptica
  - †Pecopteris feminaeformis
  - †Pecopteris hemitelioides
  - †Pecopteris hemiteloides
  - †Pecopteris pennaeformis – or unidentified comparable form
  - †Pecopteris unita
- †Periechocrinus
- †Petalodus
- †Phacops
  - †Phacops cristata
- †Pinna
- †Platyceras
  - †Platyceras gebharti
  - †Platyceras magnificum
- †Proterogyrinus
  - †Proterogyrinus scheelei
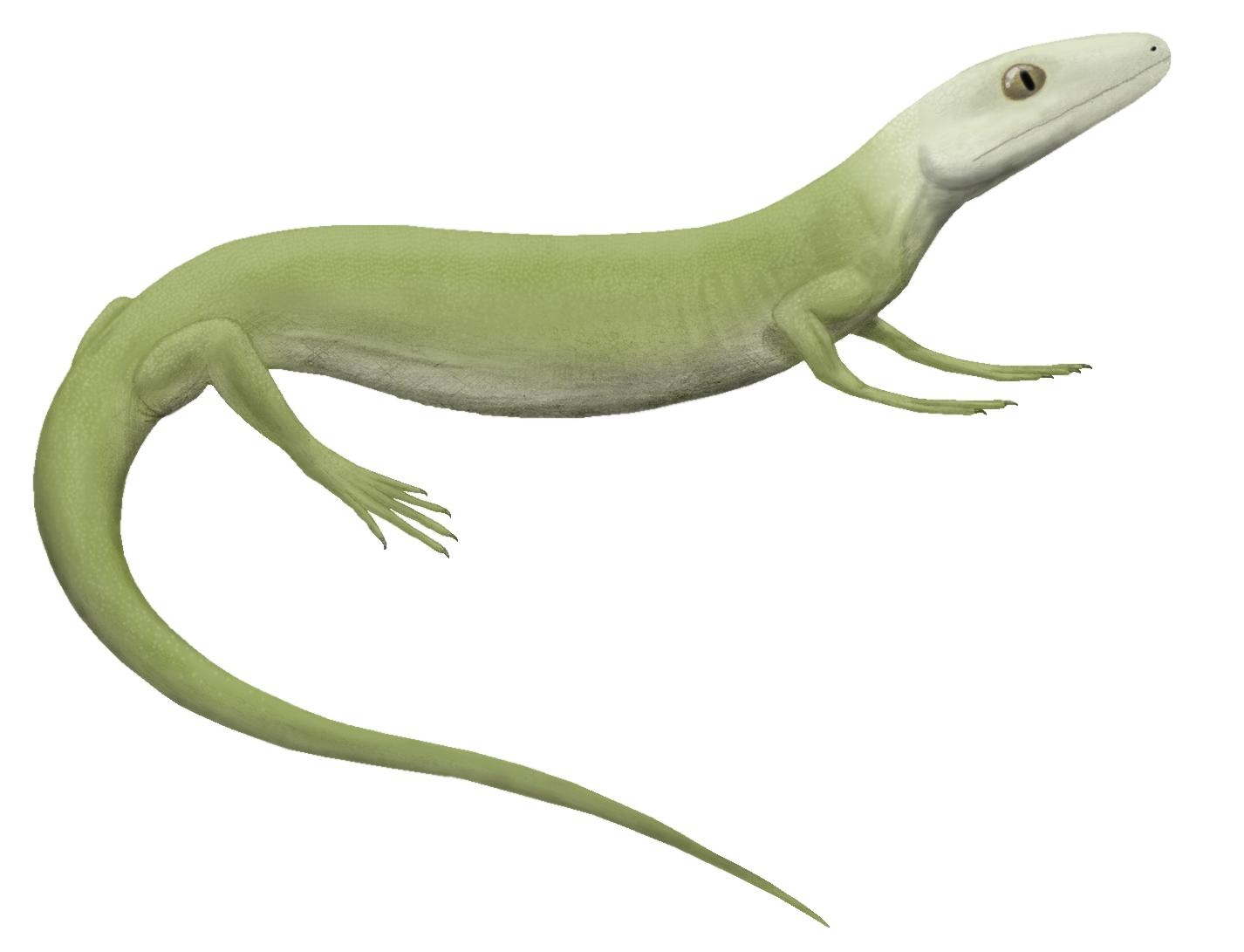
- Life restoration of the Permian reptile Protorothyris
  †Protorothyris – type locality for genus
  - †Protorothyris morani – type locality for species
- †Rhodea
- †Sagenodus – or unidentified comparable form
- †Sigillaria
  - †Sigillaria approximata
  - †Sigillaria brardii
- †Solenomorpha
- †Sphenophyllum
  - †Sphenophyllum angustifolium
  - †Sphenophyllum cornutum
  - †Sphenophyllum cuneifolium
  - †Sphenophyllum emarginatum
  - †Sphenophyllum majus
  - †Sphenophyllum oblongifolia
  - †Sphenophyllum subtenerrimmum
  - †Sphenophyllum tenuifolium
- †Sphenopteris
  - †Sphenopteris coriacea
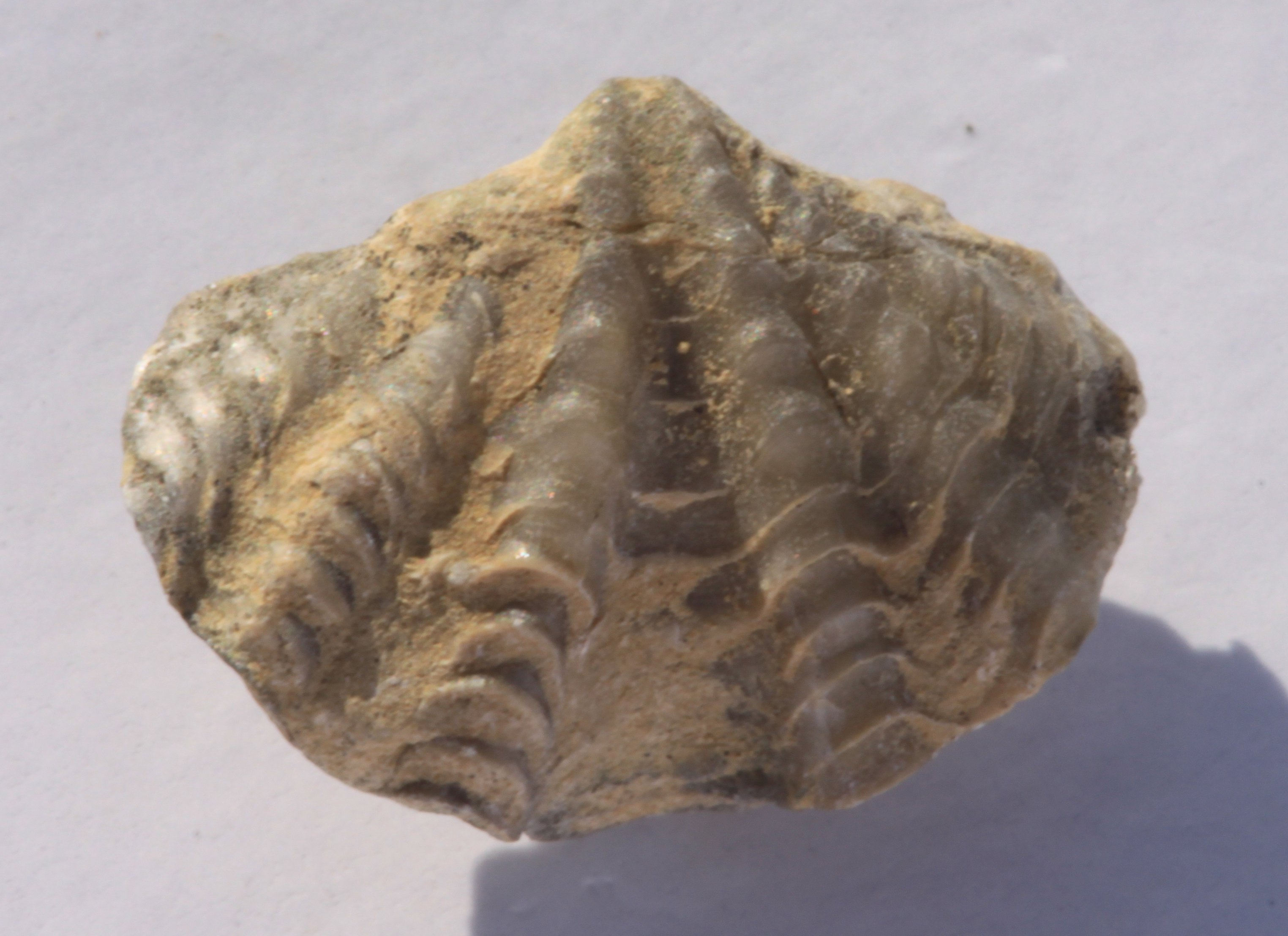
- Fossilized shell of the Late Ordovician-Late Triassic brachiopod Spirifer
  †Spirifer – report made of unidentified related form or using admittedly obsolete nomenclature
  - †Spirifer corallinensis
  - †Spirifer keyserensis
  - †Spirifer mackenzicus
  - †Spirifer vanuxemi
- †Stigmaria
- †Tentaculites
- †Tetracystis
- †Tetrameroceras
- †Trimerus
- †Waeringopterus
- †Wilkingia
- †Wurmiella
  - †Wurmiella excavata
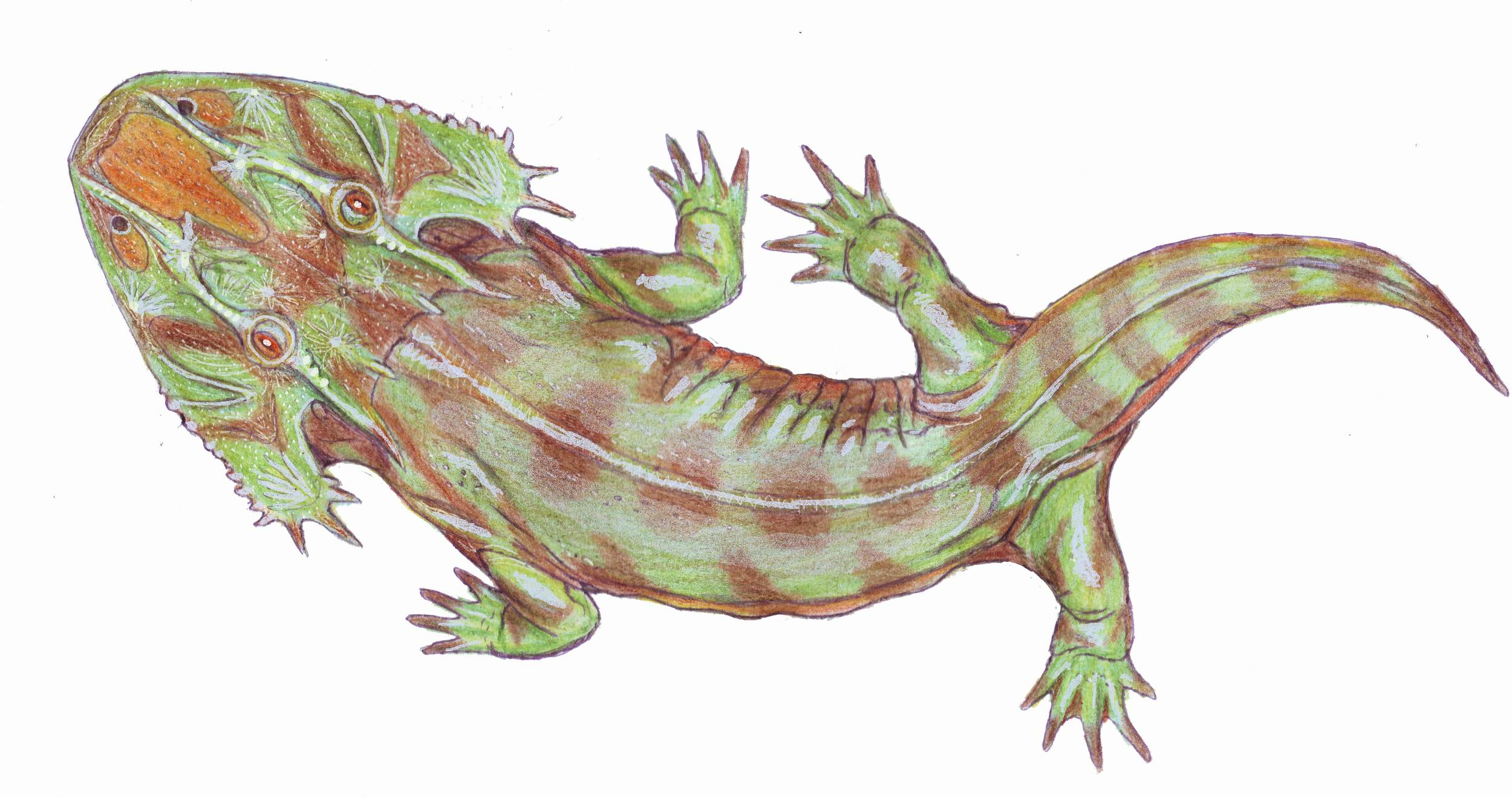
- Life restoration of the Permian amphibian Zatrachys
  †Zatrachys

== Mesozoic ==
The Paleobiology Database records no known occurrences of Mesozoic fossils in West Virginia.

== Cenozoic ==
- Agkistrodon
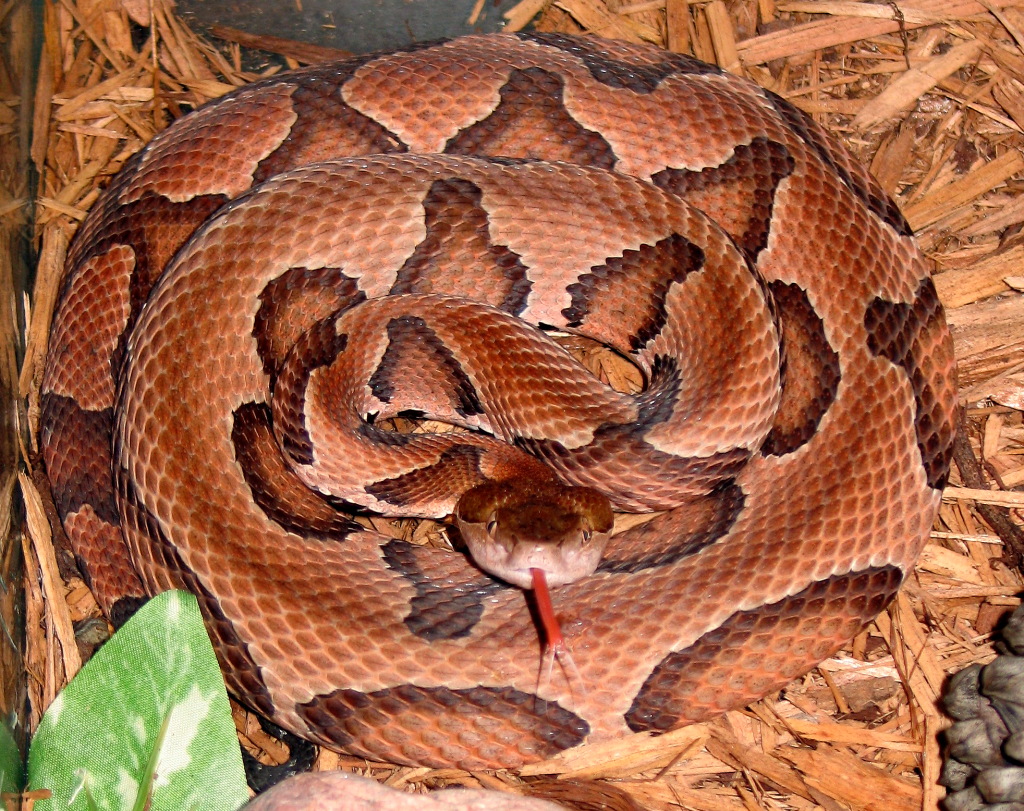
  - A living Agkistrodon contortrix, or copperhead
    †Agkistrodon contortrix
- †Allophaiomys
  - †Allophaiomys pliocaenicus
- †Ambystoma
  - †Ambystoma jeffersonianum
  - †Ambystoma maculatum
  - †Ambystoma tigrinum
- †Atopomys
  - †Atopomys texensis
- Blarina
  - †Blarina bravicauda
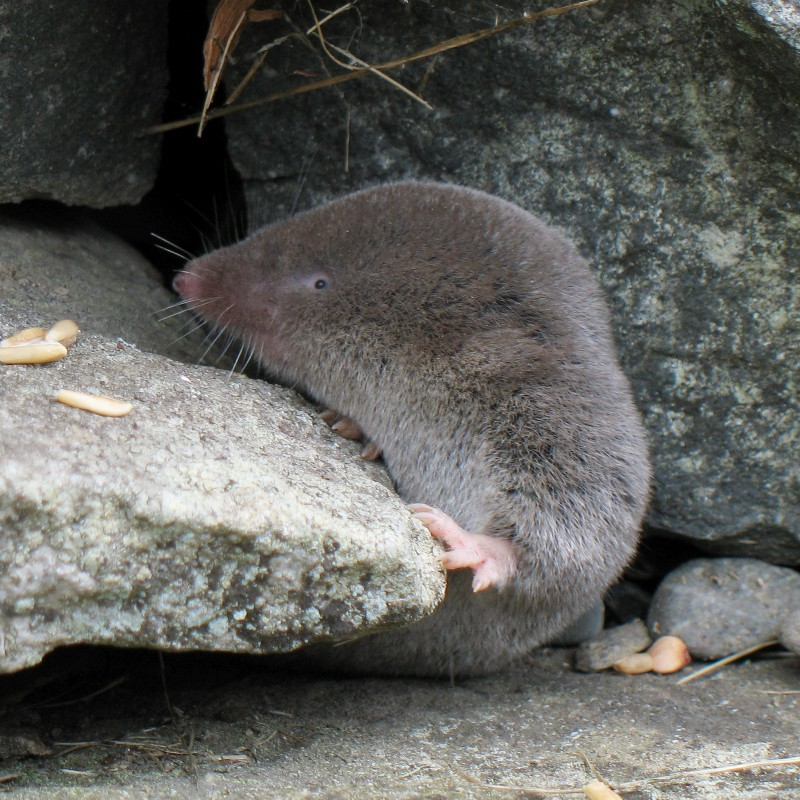
  - A living Blarina brevicauda, or northern short-tailed shrew
    †Blarina brevicauda
  - †Blarina brevicuda
- †Blarine
  - †Blarine brevicauda
- †Bootherium
  - †Bootherium bombifrons
- †Brachyprotoma
  - †Brachyprotoma obtusata
- Bufo
  - †Bufo americanus
  - †Bufo woodhousei
- Canis
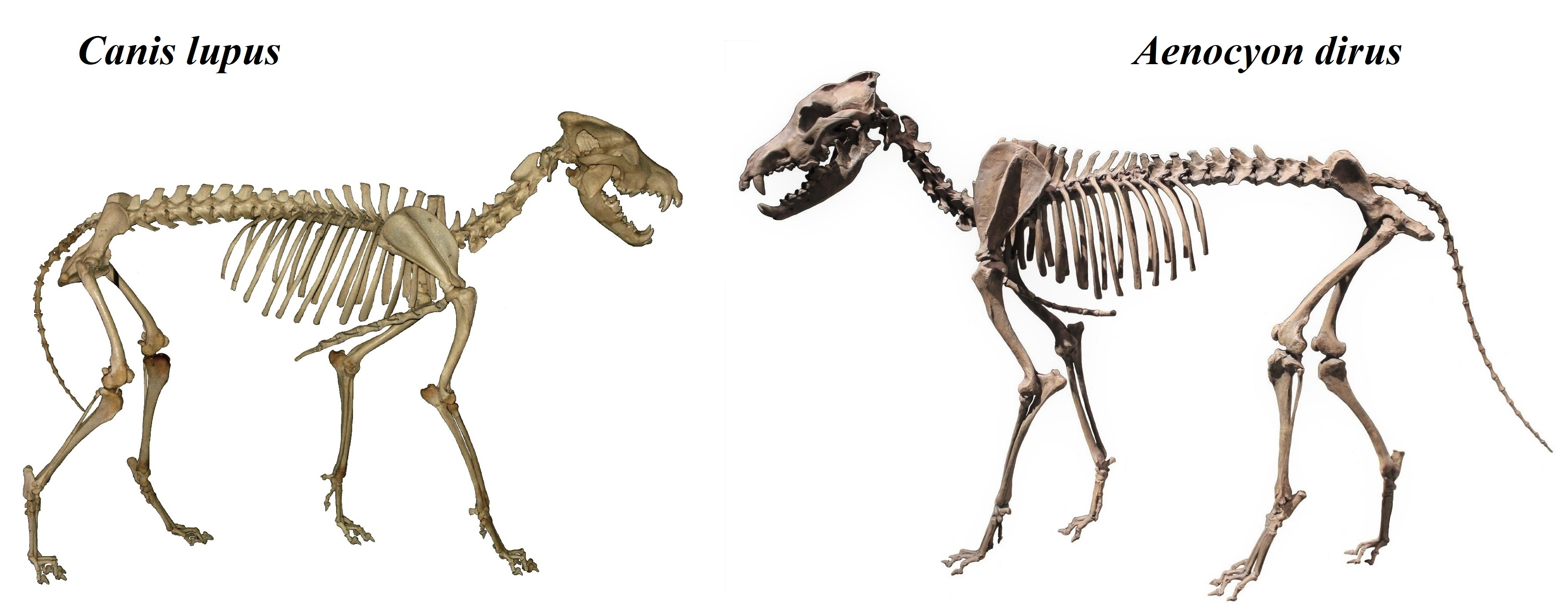
  - Modern mounted skeleton of Canis lupus, the grey wolf, to scale with a fossilized skeleton of the Pleistocene wolf Canis dirus, or dire wolf
    †Canis dirus
  - †Canis latrans
- Carphophis
  - †Carphophis amoenus
- Castor
  - †Castor canadensis
- †Cenis
  - †Cenis latrans
- Cervus
  - †Cervus elaphus
- Clethrionomys
  - †Clethrionomys gapperi
- Coluber
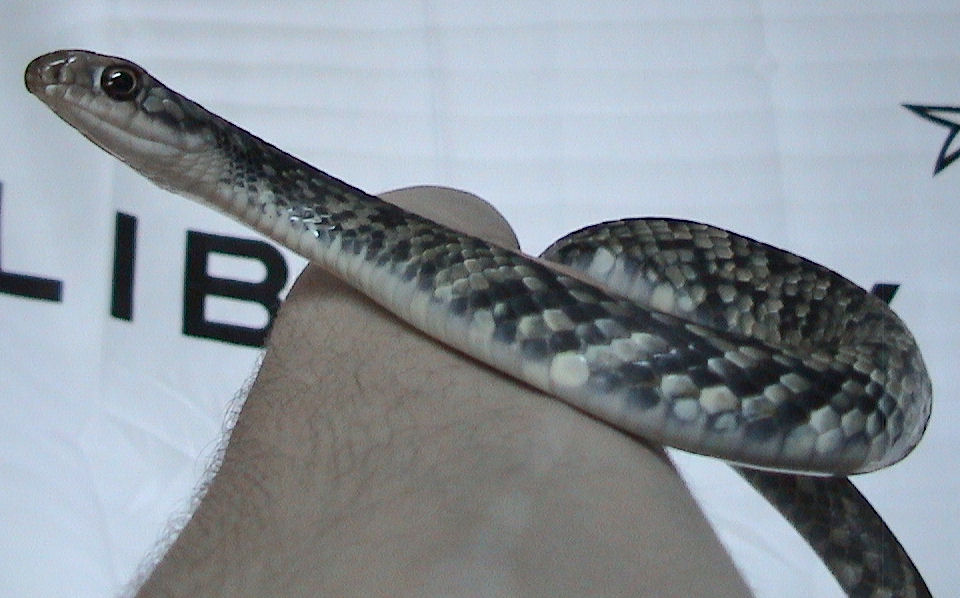
  - A living Coluber constrictor, or eastern racer
    †Coluber constrictor
- Condylura
  - †Condylura cristata
  - †Condylura crystata
- Crotalus
  - †Crotalus horridus
- Cryptobranchus
  - †Cryptobranchus alleganiensis
  - †Cryptobranchus guildayi
- Cryptotis
  - †Cryptotis parva
  - †Cryptotis pava
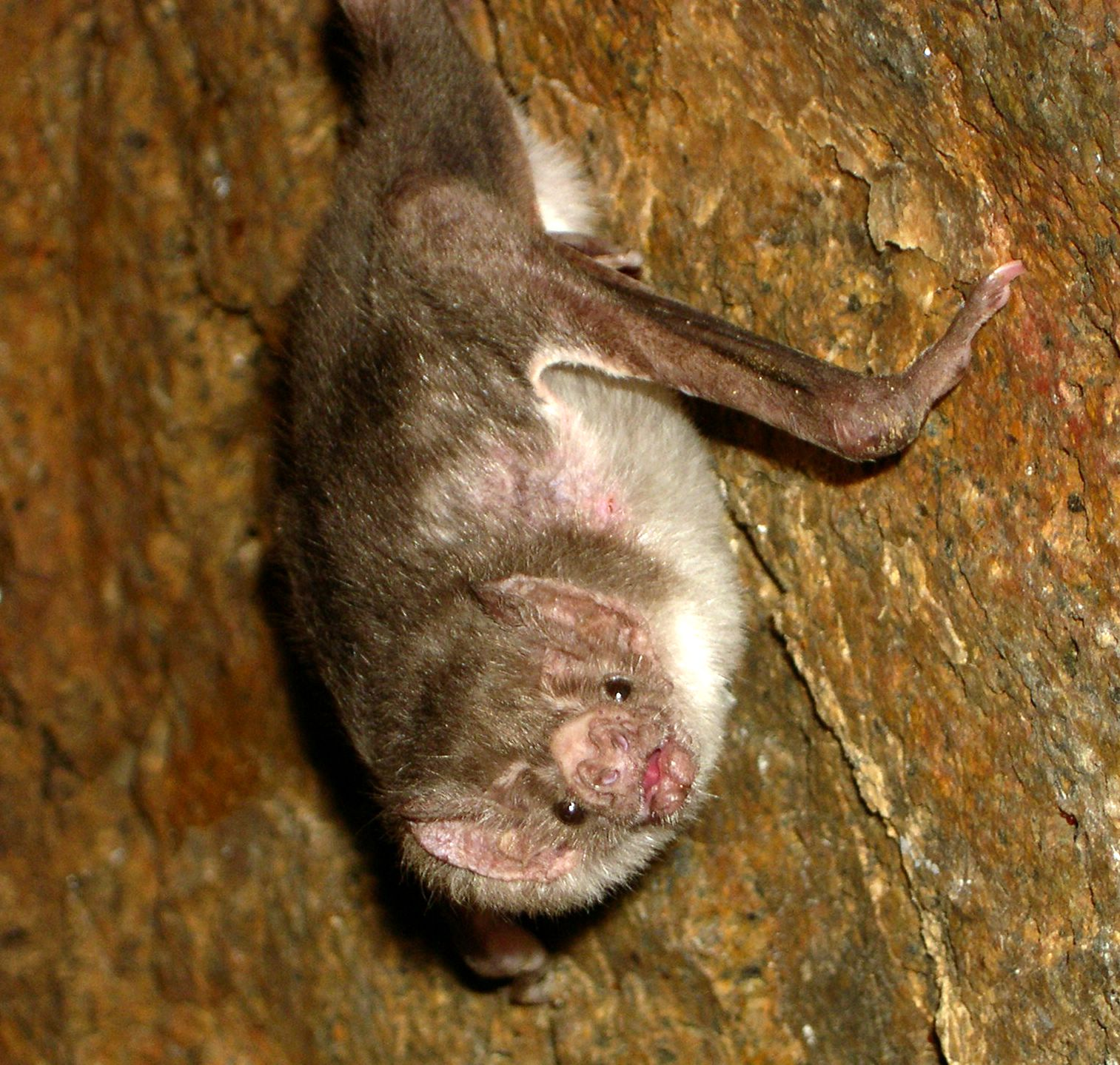
- A living Desmodus, or vampire bat
  Desmodus
  - †Desmodus stocki
- Desmognathus
  - †Desmognathus fuscus
  - †Desmognathus monticola
  - †Desmognathus ochrophaeus
- Dicrostonyx
  - †Dicrostonyx hudsonius
- †Dipoides
- †Ectopistes
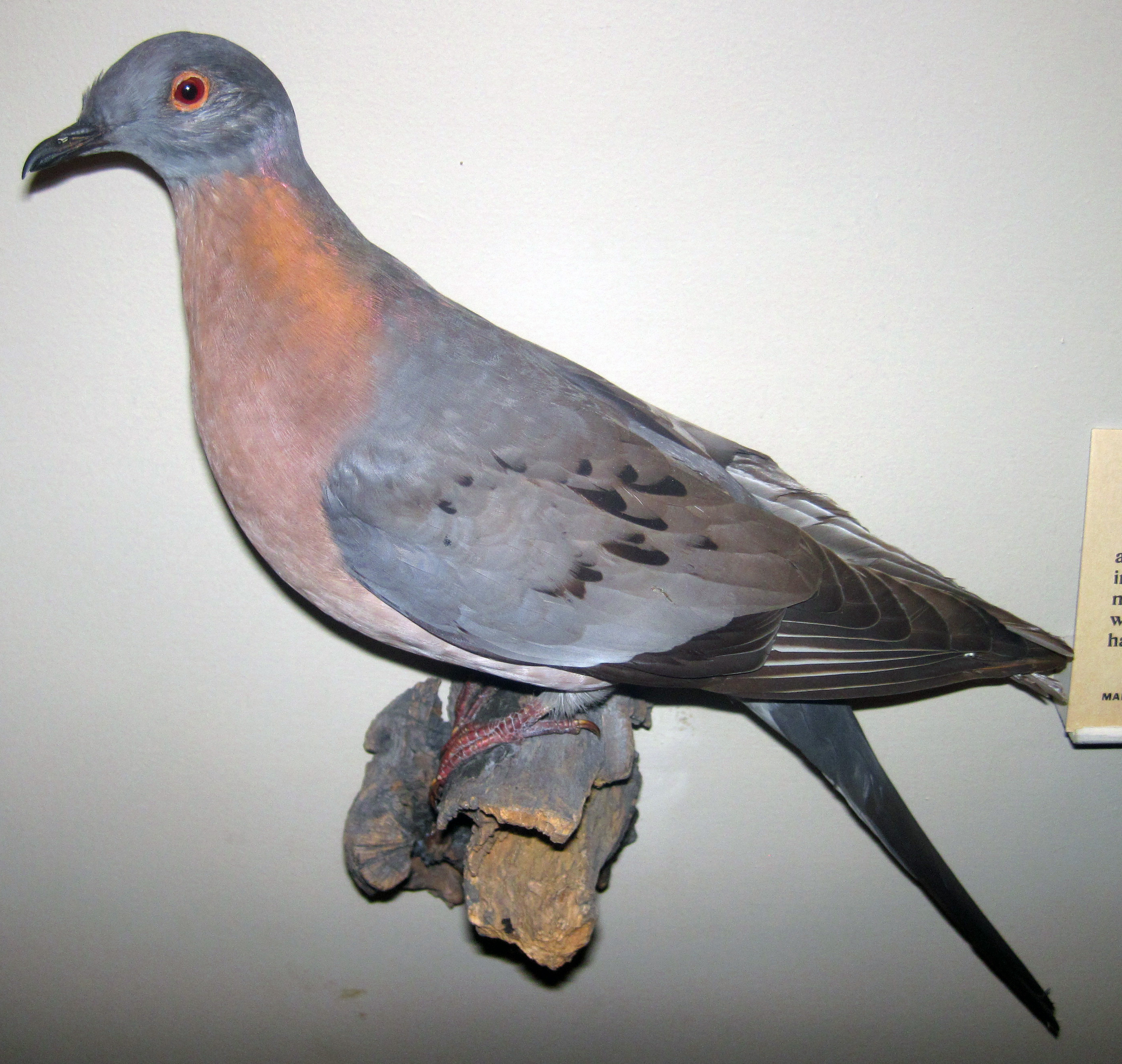
  - Taxidermied male Ectopistes migratorius, or passenger pigeon
    †Ectopistes migratorius
- Elaphe
  - †Elaphe vulpina
- Eptesicus
  - †Eptesicus fuscus
- Equus
- Erethizon
  - †Erethizon dorsatum
- Eumeces
  - †Eumeces fasciatus
  - †Eumeces laticeps
- Eutamias
  - †Eutamias minimus – or unidentified comparable form
- Geomys
  - †Geomys bursarius – or unidentified comparable form
- Glaucomys
  - †Glaucomys sabrinus
- Gyrinophilus
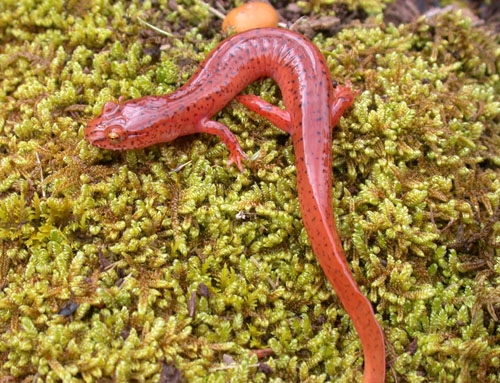
  - A living Gyrinophilus porphyriticus, or Spring salamander
    †Gyrinophilus porphyriticus
- Heterodon
  - †Heterodon platyrhinos
- Hyla
  - †Hyla chrysoscelis
  - †Hyla crucifer
- Ictalurus
- Lampropeltis
  - †Lampropeltis triangulum
- Lasiopodomys
  - †Lasiopodomys deceitensis
- Lasiurus
  - †Lasiurus borealis
- Lepus
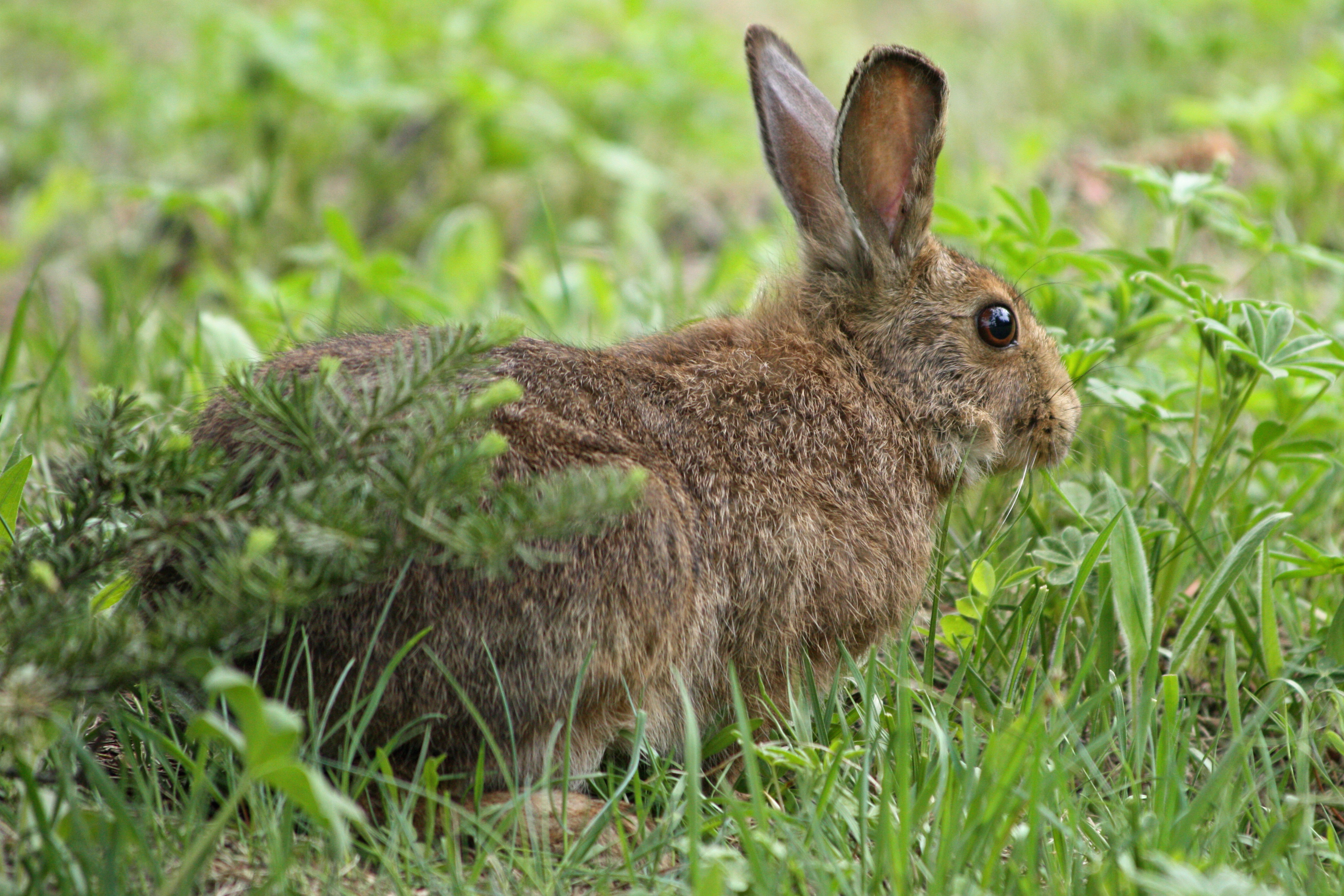
  - A living Lepus americanus, or snowshoe hare
    †Lepus americanus
- Lynx
  - †Lynx rufus
- †Mammut
  - †Mammut americanum
- †Mammuthus
- Marmota
  - †Marmota monax
- †Megalonyx
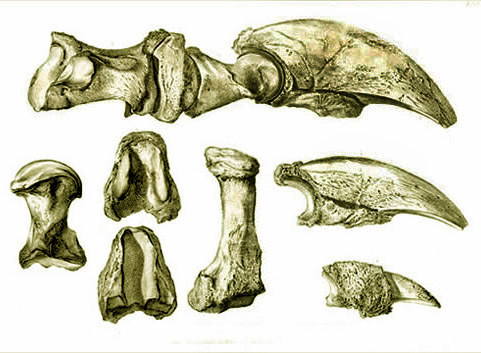
  - Claws of M. jeffersonii
    †Megalonyx jeffersonii
  - †Megalonyx jerrersonii – or unidentified comparable form
- Mephitis
  - †Mephitis mephitis
- Microtus
  - †Microtus chrotorrhinus
  - †Microtus hibbardi
  - †Microtus llanensis
  - †Microtus ochrogaster – or unidentified comparable form
  - †Microtus paroperarius
  - †Microtus pennsylvanicus
  - †Microtus pinetorum
  - †Microtus xanthognathus
- Mictomys
  - †Mictomys borealis
- †Mimomys
  - †Mimomys virginianus
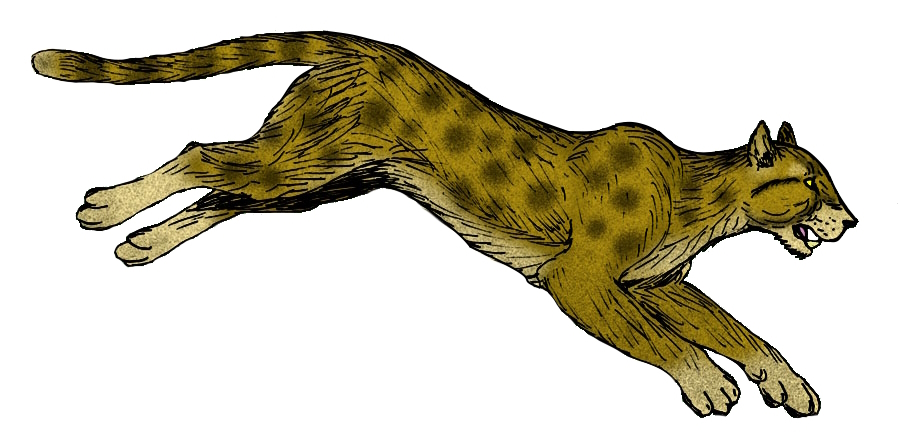
- Restoration of the Pliocene-Pleistocene Miracinonyx, or American cheetah
  †Miracinonyx
  - †Miracinonyx inexpectatus
- Mustela
  - †Mustela americana
  - †Mustela armines
  - †Mustela fenata – or unidentified comparable form
  - †Mustela frenata – or unidentified comparable form
  - †Mustela nivalis
  - †Mustela vison
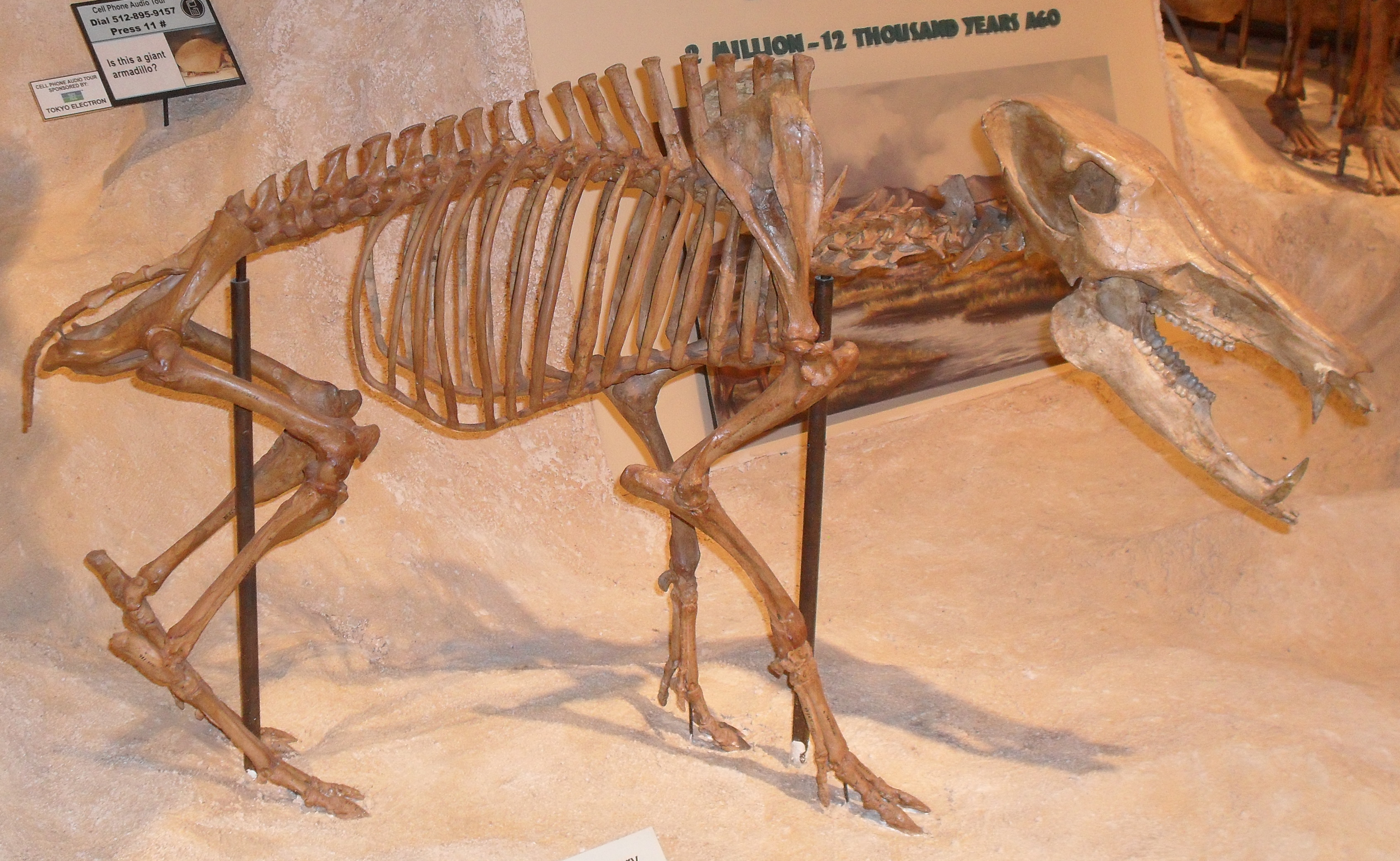
- Fossilized skeleton of the Pliocene-Holocene peccary Mylohyus
  †Mylohyus
  - †Mylohyus fossilis
- Myotis
  - †Myotis grisescens – tentative report
  - †Myotis keeni
  - †Myotis keenii
  - †Myotis leibi
  - †Myotis leibii
- Napaeozapus
  - †Napaeozapus insignis
- Neofiber
  - †Neofiber alleni – or unidentified comparable form
  - †Neofiber leonardi
- Neotoma
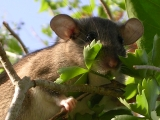
  - Close-up of a Neotoma floridana, or eastern woodrat
    †Neotoma floridana
  - †Neotoma spelaea
- Nerodia
  - †Nerodia sipedon
- Notophthalmus
  - †Notophthalmus viridescens
- Ochotona
- †Ochotone
- Odocoileus
  - †Odocoileus virginianus
- †Ondarta
  - †Ondarta ziebethicus
- Ondatra
  - †Ondatra annectens
  - †Ondatra zibethicus
- Opheodrys
  - †Opheodrys vernalis
- Panthera
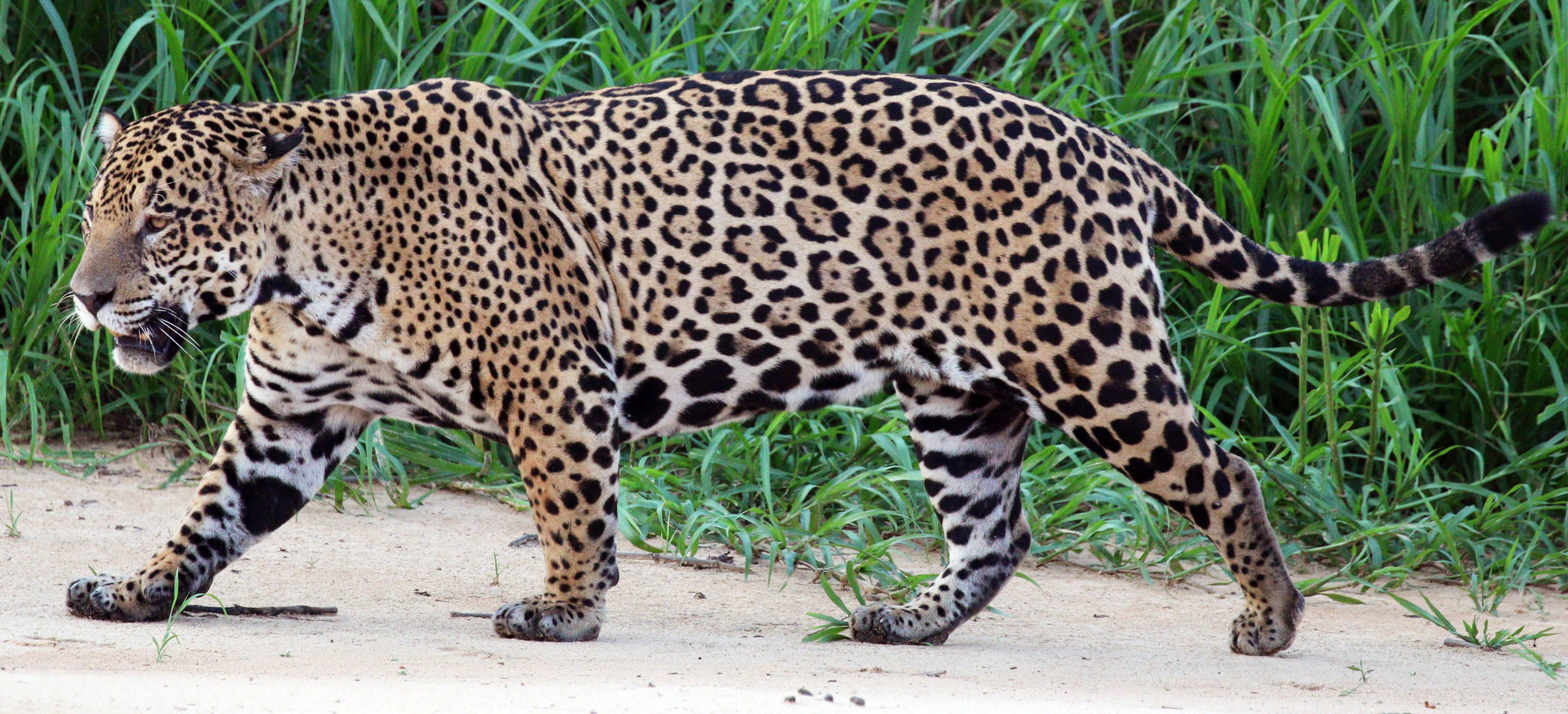
  - A living Panthera onca, or jaguar
    †Panthera onca
- †Parascalopis
  - †Parascalopis breweri
- Parascalops
  - †Parascalops breweri
- †Parascalopuis
  - †Parascalopuis breweri
- Pekania
  - †Pekania pennanti
- Peromyscus
  - †Peromyscus cumberlandensis
  - †Peromyscus maniculatus – or unidentified comparable form
- Phenacomys
  - †Phenacomys brachyodus
  - †Phenacomys intermedis
  - †Phenacomys intermedius
- Pipistrellus
  - †Pipistrellus subflavus
- Pitymys
  - †Pitymys cumberlandensis
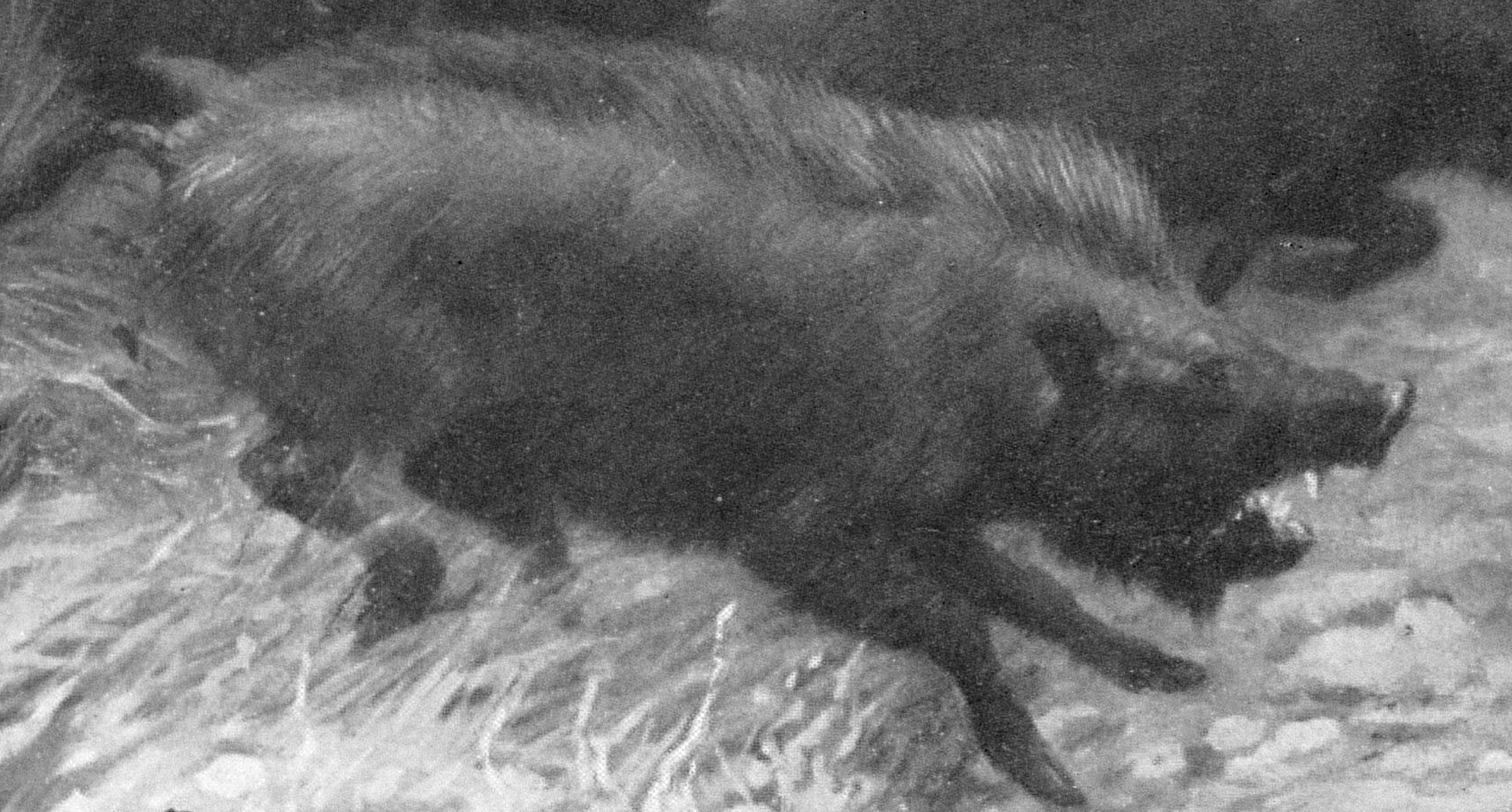
- Restoration of a herd of alarmed Miocene-Pleistocene peccaries of the genus Platygonus. Charles R. Knight (1922).
  †Platygonus
  - †Platygonus compressus
  - †Platygonus vetus
- Plecotus
- †Plesiothomomys
- Procyon
  - †Procyon lotor
- †Rana
  - †Rana catesbeina
  - †Rana clamitans
  - †Rana pipiens
  - †Rana sylvatica
- Rangifer
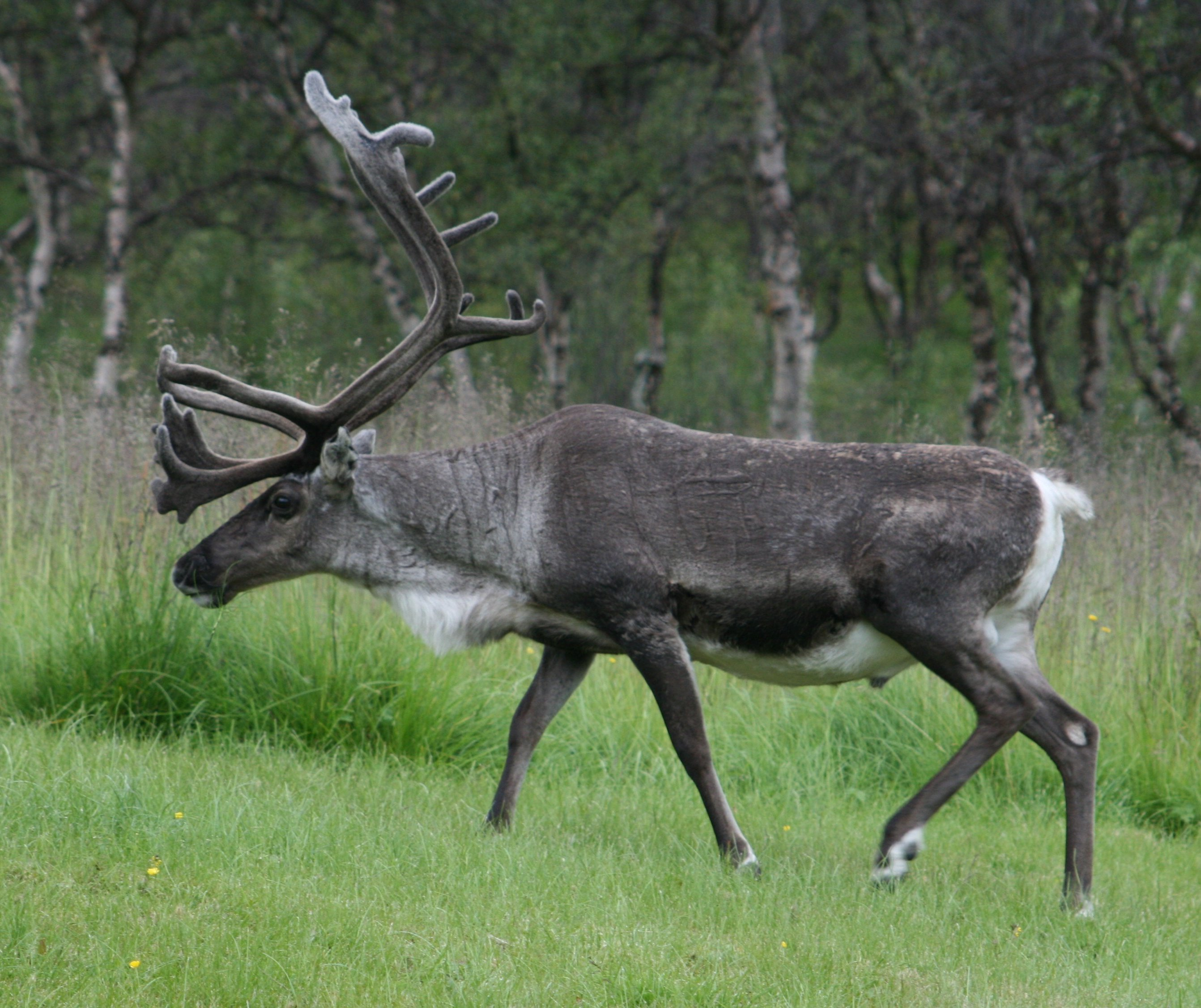
  - A living Rangifer tarandus, or reindeer
    †Rangifer tarandus
- Salamandra
  - †Salamandra opaca
- Sceloporus
  - †Sceloporus undulatus
- Sciuropterus
  - †Sciuropterus volans
- Sciurus
  - †Sciurus carolinensis – or unidentified comparable form
  - †Sciurus carolinensus
  - †Sciurus corolinensis
- Sistrurus
  - †Sistrurus catenatus
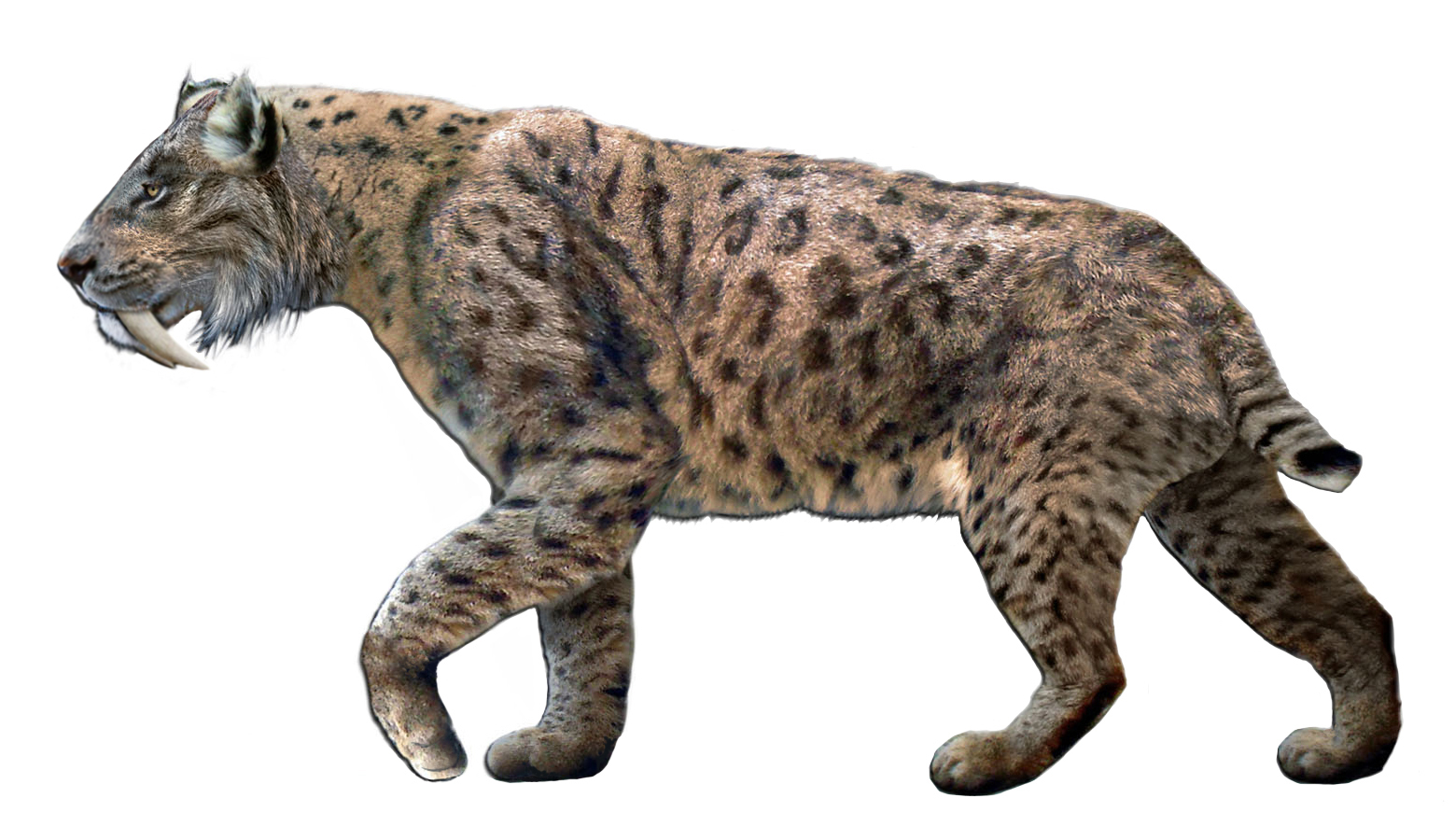
- Life restoration of the Pleistocene-Holocene saber-tooth cat Smilodon
  †Smilodon
  - †Smilodon fatalis
  - †Smilodon gracilis
- Sorex
  - †Sorex arcticus
  - †Sorex cinereus
  - †Sorex cinerus
  - †Sorex dispar
  - †Sorex fumeus
  - †Sorex hoyi
  - †Sorex palustris
- Spermophilus
  - †Spermophilus tridecemlineatus
- Spilogale
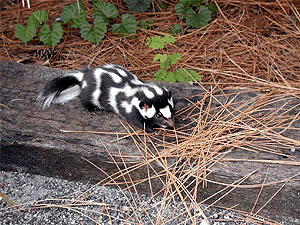
  - A living Spilogale putorius, or eastern spotted skunk
    †Spilogale putorius – or unidentified comparable form
- Storeria
- Sylvilagus
- †Sylvilegus – or unidentified comparable form
- Synaptomys
  - †Synaptomys cooperi
- Tadarida
  - †Tadarida brasiliensis – or unidentified comparable form
- Tamias
  - †Tamias striatus
- Tamiasciurus
  - †Tamiasciurus hudsonicus
- †Tamies
  - †Tamies striatus
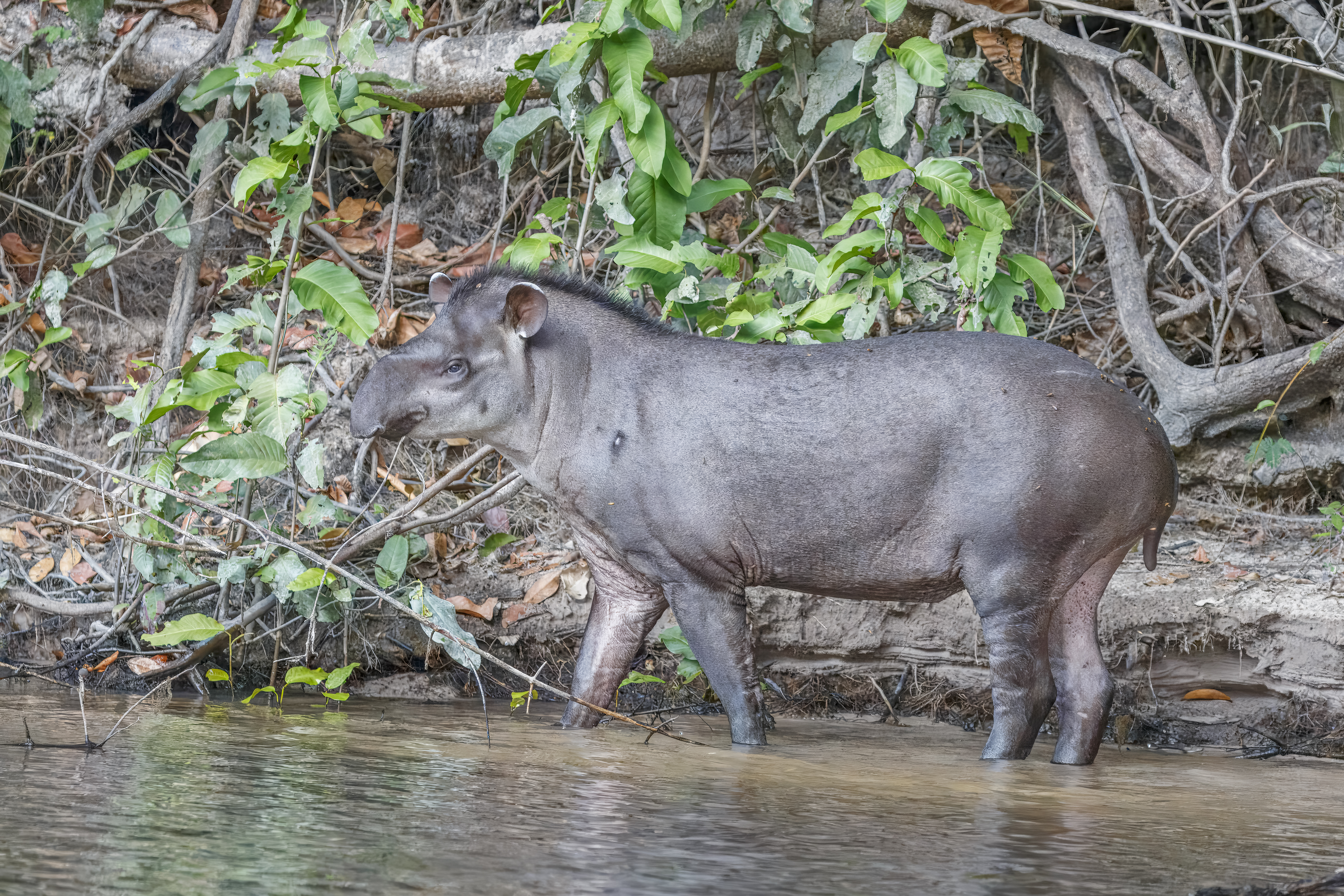
- A living Tapirus, or tapir
  Tapirus
- Taxidea
  - †Taxidea taxus
- Thamnophis
- Thomomys
  - †Thomomys potomacensis
- Urocyon
  - †Urocyon cinereoargenteus
- Ursus
  - †Ursus americanus
- Vulpes
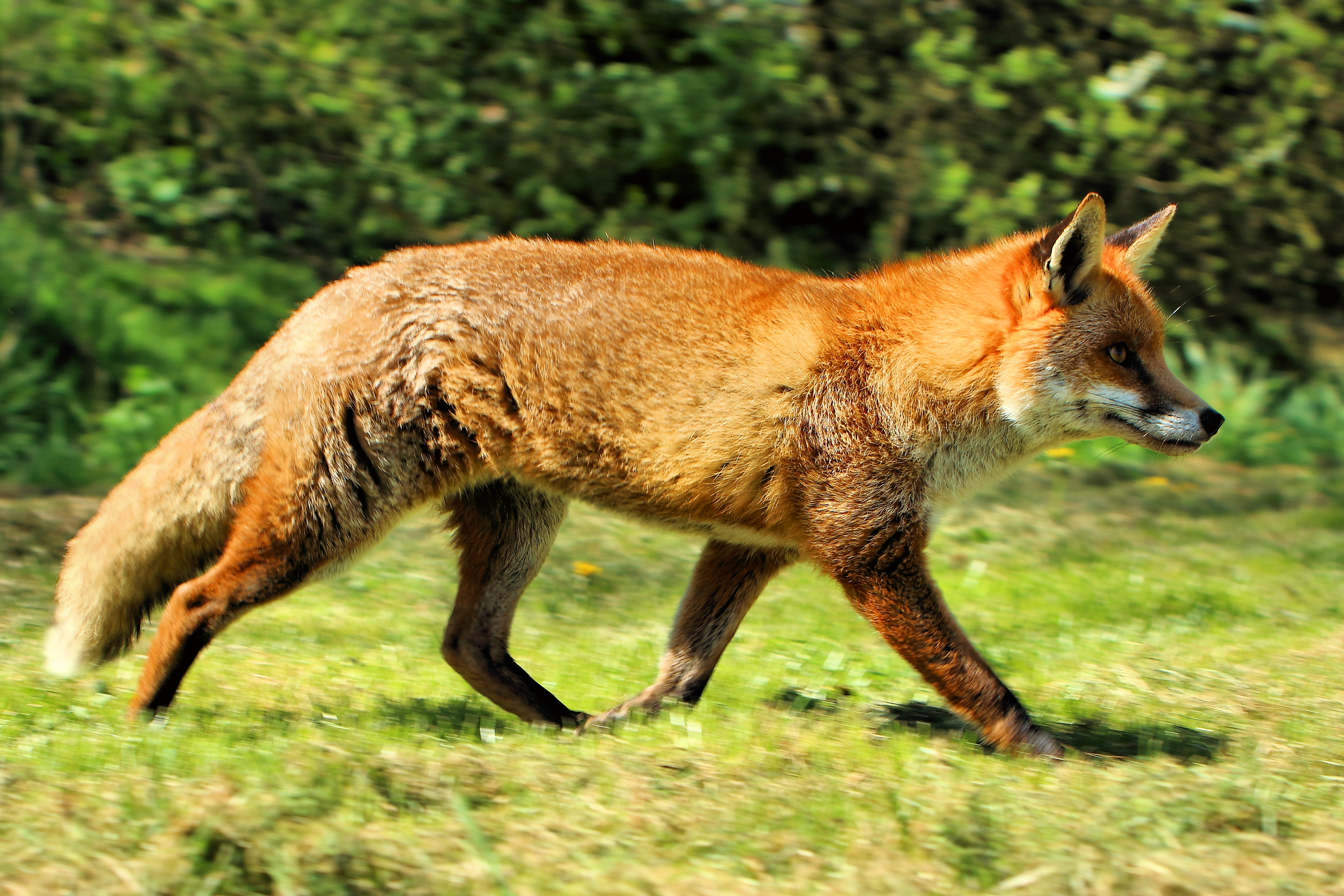
  - A living Vulpes vulpes, or red fox
    †Vulpes vulpes
- Zapus
  - †Zapus hudsonius
