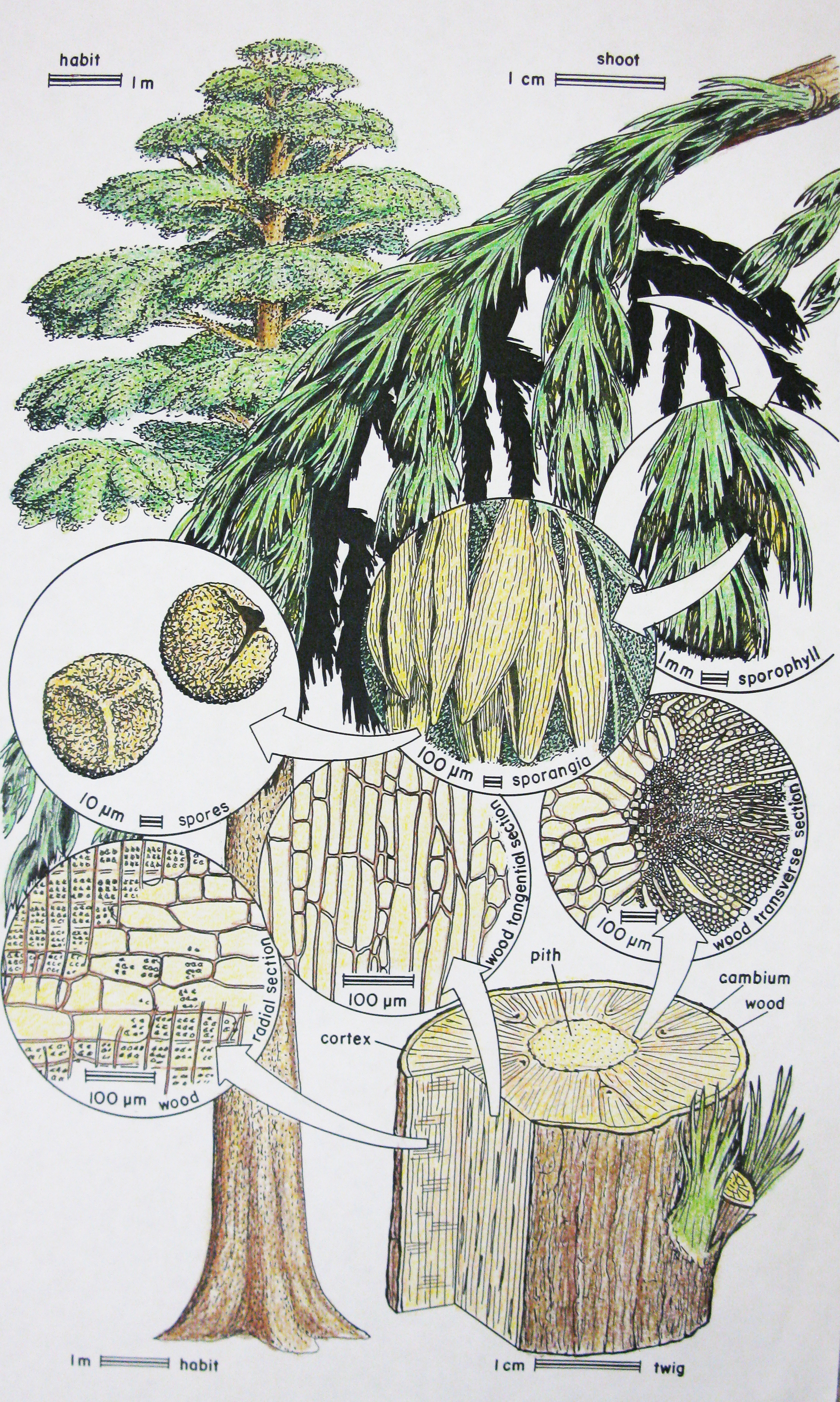
- Reconstruction of Archaeopteris macilenta from the Late Devonian Walton Formation, Hancock New York

Scientific classification
- Kingdom: Plantae
- Clade: Tracheophytes
- Class: †Progymnospermopsida
- Order: †Archaeopteridales
- Family: †Archaeopteridaceae
- Genus: †Archaeopteris
- Species: †A. macilenta

Binomial name
- †Archaeopteris macilenta Lesq.

= Archaeopteris macilenta =

Archaeopteris macilenta Temporal range: Late Devonian–Early Carboniferous

Extinct species of Devonian plant

Archaeopteris macilenta is distinguished from other species of the genus by leaves which are divided into narrow segments at their tips. Sporangia were borne on different parts of the branches with ordinary foliage leaves. Archaeopteris macilenta leaves and fertile shoots are attached to wood which when permineralized is called Callixylon newberryi. Archaeopteris is retained in the class Progymnospermopsida which includes plants with gymnospermous anatomy and pteridophytic reproduction.

== History ==
Fossilized remains of the Archaeopteris macilenta were initially discovered in 1958 the continental beds from the upper Devonian in eastern New York and have since been located in other floodplain localities from the Catskill Delta. It is often referred to as one of the earliest true ferns which bears significance. Archaeopteris made up 90% of the forests during the late Devonian which accelerated the increase of oxygen during the last 15 million years of the Devonian. They were also the first long lived perennial plants.

== Description ==
The trunk of Archaeopteris macilenta has been found to have a diameter of 1 m and an estimated height of 30 m, which may have attributed to its early success. Root systems rarely went deeper than 10 to 20 cm but depths in excess of 1 m have been reported for this tree. Moreover, its root exhibited perennial root growth and the repeated production of lateral rootlets. The enhanced penetration of soils by its root system appears to have had a profound impact on pedogenesis (the development of soils) during the Late Devonian.

Despite being a fern with sporangia, the Archaeopteris resembled modern conifers and has been found to grow similarly with woody strength built in rings to support weight and height, protective bark that shields the xylem, and extra wood at the base of the branch to prevent breakage. Carluccio, Hueber, and Banks (1966) concluded, on the basis of internal structure, that the laminar appendages of the 'fronds' were helically arranged. They showed further that the vascular system of the main axis was radially symmetrical like that of a stem. These results led them to conclude that the 'fronds' of Archaeopteris macilenta are, in fact, not compound leaves, but rather, flattened lateral branch systems bearing simple leaves. Much lateral branch systems would, indeed, be very similar to those of conifers. Leaf and branch trace formation-The protoxylem regions are radially elongate, and except in regions just above levels of leaf trace divergence consist of two protoxylem poles connected by a sheet of protoxylem tracheids mixed, apparently, with parenchyma. Upon the separation of a trace, the outer pole is reconstituted within a longitudinal distance of 2 or 3 mm, and the protoxylem poles again begin their radial separation which will culminate in the divergence of another leaf trace at a higher level.

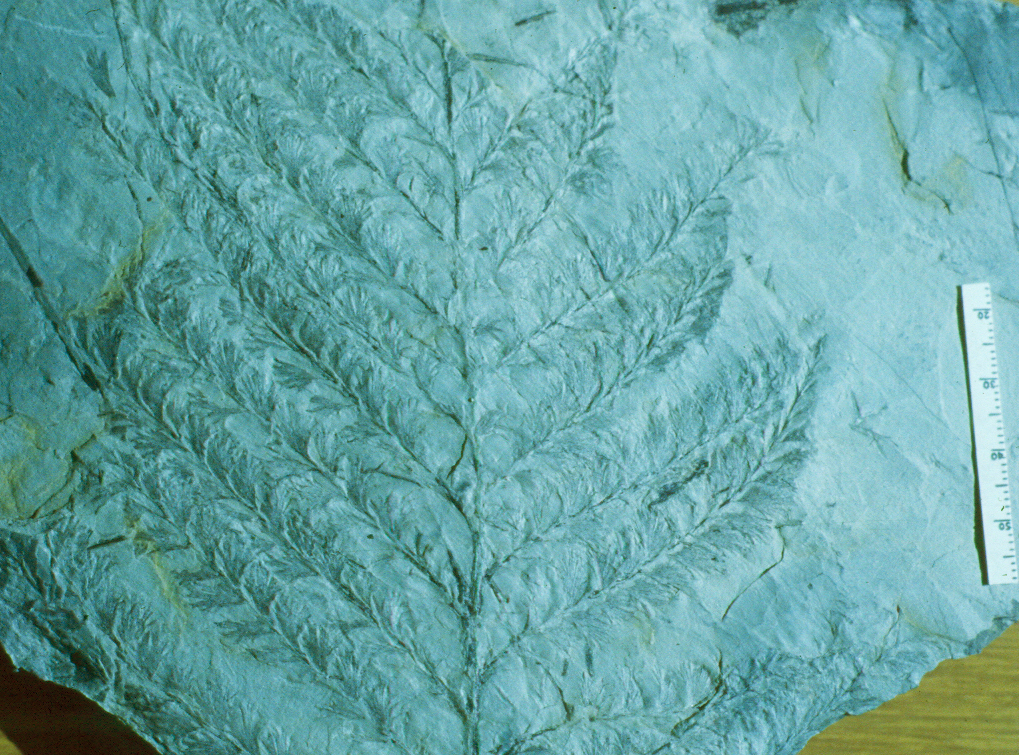
A sterile specimen of Archaeopteris macilenta from the Late Devonian, Walton Formation of Deposit, New York

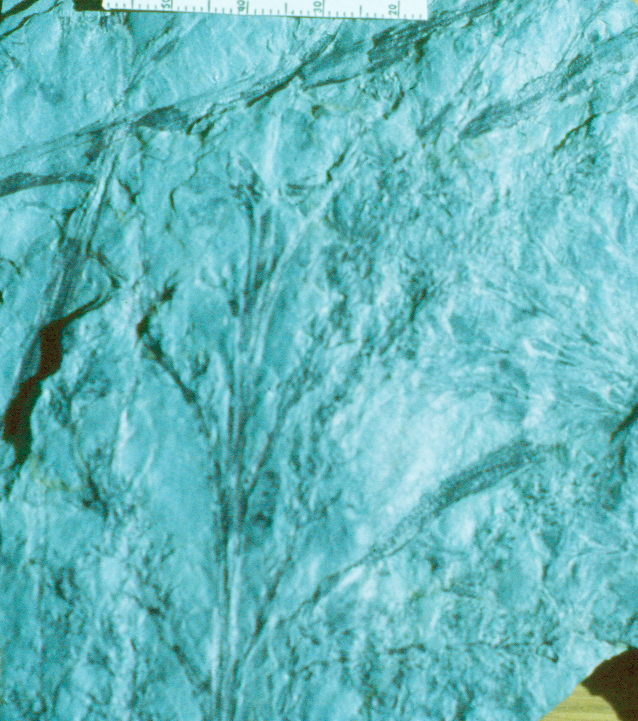
A fertile specimen of Archaeopteris macilenta from the Late Devonian Walton Formation of deposit, New York
