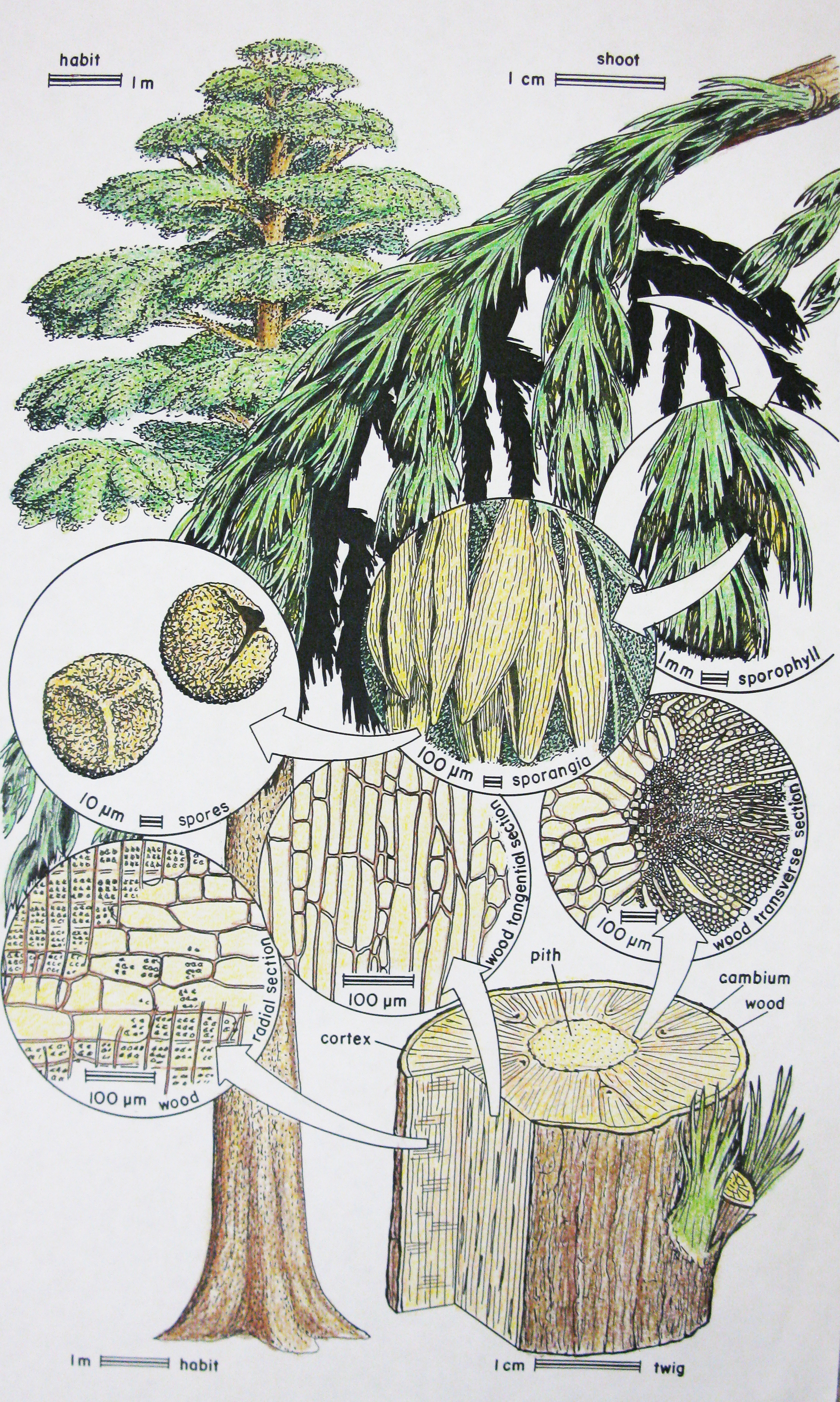
- Reconstruction of the extinct progymnosperm plant Archaeopteris macilenta based on fossils from the Catskill Mountains of New York.

Scientific classification
- Kingdom: Plantae
- Clade: Tracheophytes
- Class: †Progymnospermopsida
- Order: †Archaeopteridales
- Family: †Archaeopteridaceae

Genera
- †Archaeopteris leafy and fertile shoots; †Svalbardia leafy and fertile shoots; †Callixylon permineralized wood

= Archaeopteridaceae =

Archaeopteridaceae Temporal range: Middle Devonian–Late Devonian

Extinct family of trees

The Archaeopteridaceae are an extinct family of plants belonging to Progymnospermae, and were dominant forest trees of the Late Devonian.
