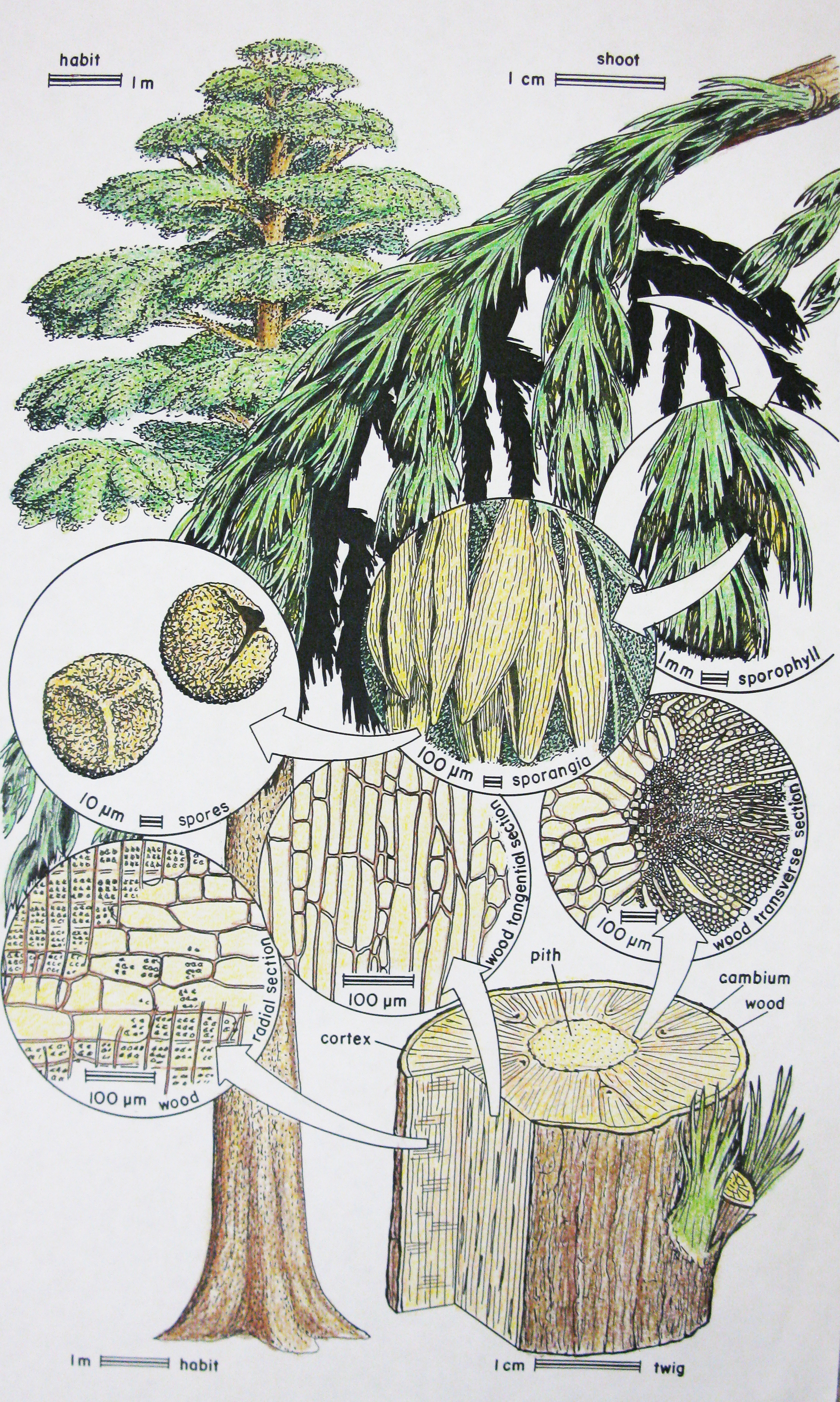
- Reconstruction of the extinct progymnosperm plant Archaeopteris macilenta based on fossils from the Catskill Mountains of New York.

Scientific classification
- Kingdom: Plantae
- Clade: Tracheophytes
- Class: †Progymnospermopsida
- Order: †Archaeopteridales

Families
- †Archaeopteridaceae

= Archaeopteridales =

Archaeopteridales Temporal range: Middle Devonian–Late Devonian

Extinct order of trees

The Archaeopteridales are an extinct order of plants belonging to Progymnospermae, and dominant forest trees of the Late Devonian. They reproduced with spores rather than seeds. They were the evolutionary precursors of the conifers of gymnosperms which also include cycads and ginkgo.
