= Montceau-les-Mines lagerstätte =

Carboniferous lagerstätte in France

The Montceau-les-Mines lagerstätte is a Carboniferous lagerstätte named after and located within the town of Montceau-les-Mines, France. It preserves numerous flora and fauna similar to those of the Mazon Creek fossil beds in the United States, such as temnospondyls, velvet worms, arachnids and more.

== Paleobiota ==
Color key: Taxon / Reclassified taxon / Taxon falsely reported as present / Dubious taxon or junior synonym / Ichnotaxon / Ootaxon / Morphotaxon

Notes
Uncertain or tentative taxa are in small text
~~crossed out~~ taxa are discredited.

=== Panarthropods ===
==== Lobopodians ====
Lobopodia
Genus	Species	Higher taxon	Notes	Images
Antennipatus	A. montceauensis	Indeterminate Onychophora	Earliest known definite onychophoran known from three specimens. Likely terrestrial or at least semi-aquatic.	Part and counterpart of Antennipatus specimen
Palaeocampa	P. anthrax	Aysheaiidae	First known freshwater and poisonous lobopodian	French specimen of Palaeocampa anthrax

==== Arthropods ====
Arthropoda
Genus	Species	Higher taxon	Notes	Images
Alanops = Liomesaspis birtwelli	A. magnificus	Xiphosura Bellinuridae	Likely capable of volvation	Alanops reconstruction
Ameticos	A. scolos	Opiliones Dyspnoi	Very similar to modern harvestmen	
Macrogyion	M. cronus	Opiliones Eupnoi	Very similar to modern harvestmen	
Hastocularis	H. argus	Opiliones Tetrophthalmi	A basal harvestman	Hastocularis argus reconstruction
Aphantomartus	A. areolatus	Trigonotarbida		
Trigonotarbus	T. sp	Trigonotarbida		
Idmonarachne	I. brasieri	Serikodiastida	Similar to spiders, but lacked spinnerets	Idmonarachne reconstruction
Palaeothele	P. montceauensis	Araneae Mesothelae	First mesothele spider known, previously named "Eothele"	
Allobuthus	A. pescei	ScorpionesAnthracoscorpionidae		
Coseleyscorpio	C. lanceolatus	Scorpiones		
Schramixerxes	S. gerem	Euthycarcinoidea	Redescribed in 2008	
Sottyxerxes	S. multiplex	Euthycarcinoidea	Redescribed in 2008	Reconstruction of Sottyxerxes
Amynilyspes	A. fatimae	Oniscomorpha	One of the rarest components of the fauna; only five found in over 20,000 concretions	A. crescens fossil
Blanziulus	B. parriati	Xyloiulidae	Likely terrestrial in nature	
Arthropleura	A. sp	Arthropleuridea	Specimens from Montceau preserve the first known head anatomy of the genus	Reconstruction of Arthropleura Fossil of Arthropleura sp.
Sottyella	S. montceauensis	Phreatoicidea	Found while searching for myriapods	
Chabardella	C. spinosa	Gorgonophontidae	Bears spines on its segment margins	
Palaeocrangon?	cf. P. sp	Phreatoicidea	Very fragmentary, may not belong to the genus	
Palaeocaris	P. secretae P. typus P. retractata	Syncarida	Known from thousands of specimens	
Montcestheria	M. orri	Spinicaudata	Relatively large spinicaudatan, reached around 2 cm length	
Euestheria	E. feysi	Spinicaudata	Much smaller than Montcestheria	
Carbonita	C. ?salteriana	Podocopida	Unclear whether it belongs to the genus	
Anebos	A. phrixos	Pterygota	Interpreted as a stem-orthopteran, yet bears similarities to some megasecopteran larvae?	Fossil of Anebos
Phenopterum	P. briggsi	Grylloblattodea	Redescribed alongside a Permian species in the same genus	
Montceaupterum	M. baillyi	Grylloblattodea	Oldest member of its family (Euryptilonidae)	

=== Mollusks ===
Mollusca
Genus	Species	Higher taxon	Notes	Images
Anthraconaia	A. lusitanica			

=== Vertebrates ===
Vertebrates
Montcellia	M. longidentata	Nectridea Urocordylidae	Formerly classed within Sauropleura	
Sauravus	S. costei; S. spinosus			
Montceaubatrachus	M. platyrhynchus	Temnospondyli Amphibamiformes	Bears similarities to Gerobatrachus	
Actinodon	A. sp			
Micromelerpeton	M. boyi	TemnospondyliMicromelerpetidae		
Nyranerpeton	N. montceauense	TemnospondyliMicromelerpetidae	Another species known from the Kladno Formation	
Indeterminate		Temnospondyli Archegosauridae?	Originally described as Actinodon	
Branchiosaurus	B. petrolei	Temnospondyli Branchiosauridae		
Bourbonnella	B. sottyi B. fourrieri	Aeduellidae	Likely lived across the tropics during the latest Carboniferous	B. sottyi fossil
Igornella	I. montcellensis	Igornichthyidae		
Platysella	P. descusi	Aeduellidae		
Myxineidus	M. gonorum	Cyclostomi	Debated as to whether the genus is a hagfish or lamprey	M. gonorum fossil
Expleuracanthus	E. sp.	Xenacanthiformes	A freshwater xenacanth shark, known from dorsal spines from the "Fish Shale Bed"	A xenacanthid spine from Montceau-Les-Mines
Sagenodus	S. sp.	Dipnoi	A fragmentary lungfish probably within the genus Sagenodus	Skull roof of Sagenodus copeanus
Acanthodes	A. sp.	Acanthodidae	Fragmentary remains of Acanthodes are known from the "Fish Shale Bed" and some nodules	Reconstruction of Acanthodes lopatini
Phlegethontia	P. sp.	Aistopoda	A snake-like lepospondyl tetrapod	Reconstruction of Phlegethontia as a terrestrial animal
Stereorachis?	S.? blanziacensis	Ophiacodontidae	Unnumbered specimen consisting of mandible and skull fragments	Reconstruction of Stereorachis

=== Plants ===
==== Ferns (Polypodiopsida) ====
Genus	Species	Higher taxon	Notes	Images
Annularia	A. mucronata A. sphenophylloides A. spicata A. stellata	Calamitaceae	A form taxon assigned to the leaves of Calamites.	Annularia stellata
Asterophyllites	A. equisetiformis	Calamitaceae		
Calamites	C. cistii C. cruciatus C. sp.	Calamitaceae	A genus of tree-like horsetail closely related to the modern Equisetum.	Fossil stems of Calamites
Calamostachys	C. tuberculata	Calamitaceae		
Sphenophyllostachys	S. sp.	Sphenophyllales		
Sphenophyllum	S. angustifolium S. longifolium S. oblongifolium	Sphenophyllales		Sphenophyllum miravallis
Pecopteris	P. cyathea P. feminaeformis P. hemitelioides P. lepidorachis P. miltoni P. platonii P. polymorpha P. pseudo-oreopteridia P. unita P. aff. affinis P. aff. elaverica P. aff. launayi P. sp.	Marattiaceae	A common form of fern leaf	Pecopteris palacea

==== Seed ferns (Pteridospermatophyta) ====
Genus	Species	Higher taxon	Notes	Images
Sphenopteris	S. cristata S. leptophylla S. aff. picandeti S. sp.	Lyginopteridaceae		Sphenopteris fossil from France
Alethopteris	A. zeilleri A. sp.	Alethopteridaceae		Alethopteris fossil
Callipteridium	C. costei	Cyclopteridaceae		Callipteridium gigas
Dicksonites	D. pluckenetii D. sterzelii	Callistophytales		
Linopterus	L. sp.			
Neuropteris	N. cordata N. planchardi N. sp.	Neurodontopteridaceae		Neuropteris fossil
Odontopteris	O. minor O. reichiana O. subcrenulata	Pteridospermophyta		Odontopteris minor
Pseudomariopteris	P. sp.	Pteridospermophyta		

==== Conifers (Gymnospermae) ====
Genus	Species	Higher taxon	Notes	Images
Taeniopteris	T. jejunata	Cycadophyta		Taeniopteris jejunata
Cordaitanthus	C. aff. baccifer C. sp.	Cordaitales		
Cordaites	C. sp.	Cordaitales		Cordaites lungatus
