= Igornella =

Igornella Temporal range: Early Gzhelian–Asselian

Scientific classification
- Kingdom: Animalia
- Phylum: Chordata
- Class: Actinopterygii
- Family: †Igornichthyidae
- Genus: †Igornella; Heyler, 1969

Type species
- †Igornella comblei Heyler, 1969

Other species
- †I. montcellensis Heyler & Poplin, 1994

Extinct genus of fishes

Igornella is an extinct genus of prehistoric freshwater ray-finned fish known from the late Carboniferous and early Permian of Europe.

The following species are known:

- I. comblei Heyler, 1969 - Late Carboniferous/earliest Permian (Gzhelian or Asselian) of France (Igornay Formation)
- I. montcellensis Heyler & Poplin, 1994 - Gzhelian of France (Montceau-les-Mines lagerstätte)

Some studies have suggested that this genus is doubtfully distinct from the co-occurring Igornichthys, but more recent studies have found them to be distinct.

== See also ==
- Prehistoric fish
- List of prehistoric bony fish
