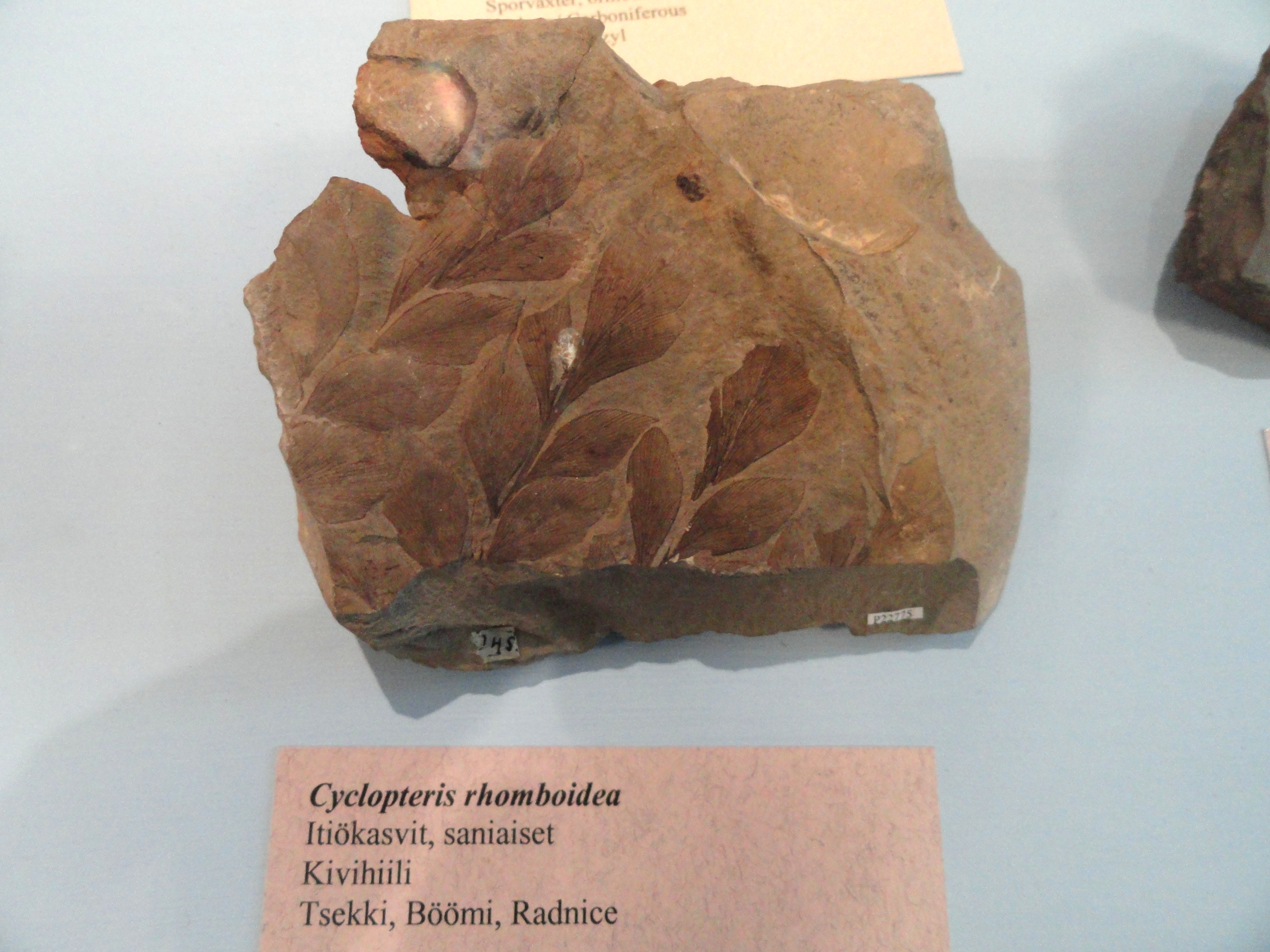
- Cyclopteris rhomboidea - Exhibit in the Arppeanum, Helsinki, Finland.

Scientific classification
- Kingdom: Plantae
- Division: †Pteridospermatophyta
- Order: †Medullosales
- Family: †Cyclopteridaceae
- Genus: †Cyclopteris Brongniart, 1828

Species
- Cyclopteris rhomboidea and see text

= Cyclopteris =

Cyclopteris Temporal range: 360.7–0.012 Ma

Extinct genus of ferns

Cyclopteris is an extinct genus of seed ferns in the extinct family †Cyclopteridaceae. It has several assigned species

- Cyclopteris elegans
- Cyclopteris lobata
- Cyclopteris moquensis
- Cyclopteris orbicularis
- Cyclopteris primordialis
- Cyclopteris reniformis (type)
- Cyclopteris rhomboidea
