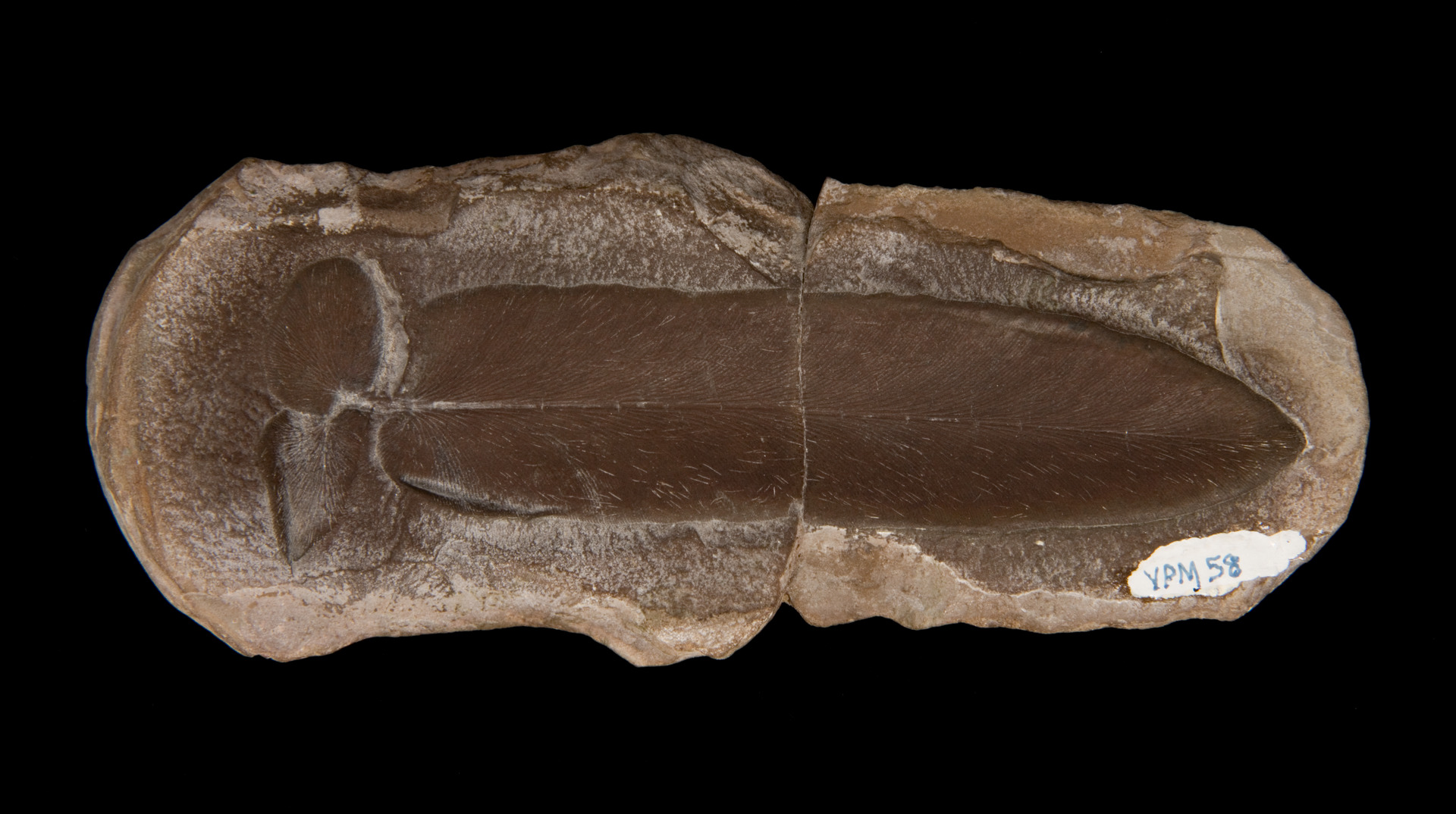
- Macroneuropteris scheuchzeri, specimen from Mazon Creek fossil beds in the collection at the Yale Peabody Museum of Natural History

Scientific classification
- Kingdom: Plantae
- Clade: Tracheophytes
- Division: †Pteridospermatophyta
- Order: †Medullosales
- Family: †Neurodontopteridaceae
- Genus: †Macroneuropteris; Cleal et al., 1990

Species
- M. scheuchzeri; M. macrophylla; M. britannica; M. subauriculata

= Macroneuropteris =

Macroneuropteris Temporal range: Carboniferous

Extinct genus of plants

Macroneuropteris is a genus of Carboniferous seed plants in the order Medullosales. The genus is best known for the species Macroneuropteris scheuchzeri, a medium-size tree that was common throughout the late Carboniferous Euramerica. Three similar species, M. macrophylla, M. britannica and M. subauriculata are also included in the genus.

== Taxonomic history ==
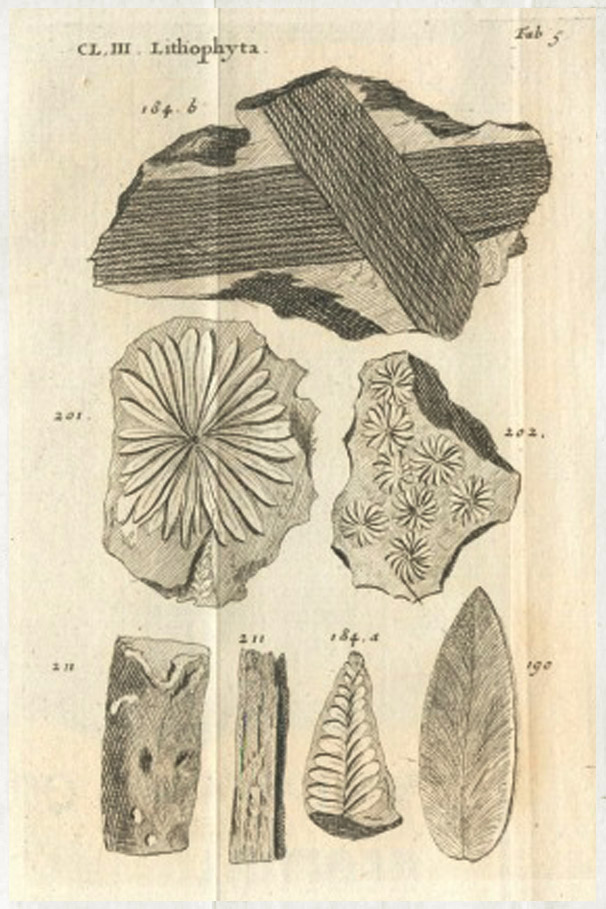
This 1699 illustration is the first depiction of Macroneuropteris (lower right).

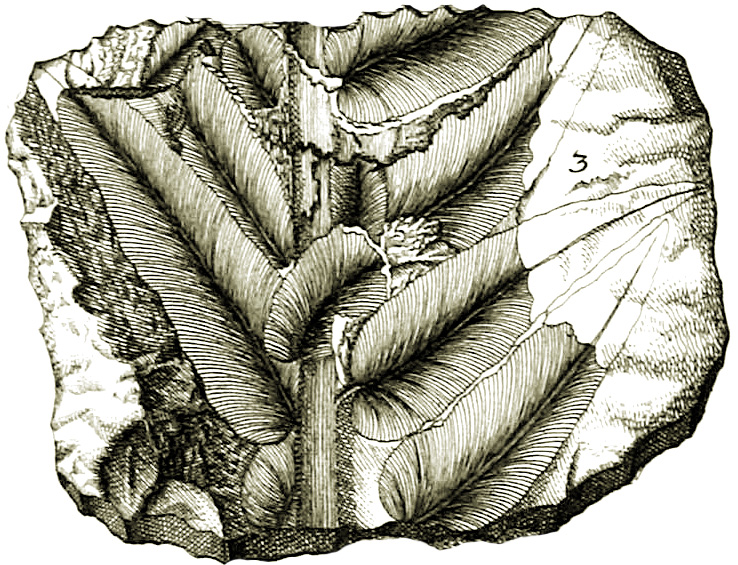
An illustration of Phyllites mineralis (now Macroneuropteris scheuchzeri) in Herbarium Diluvianum by Johann Jakob Scheuchzer, 1723.

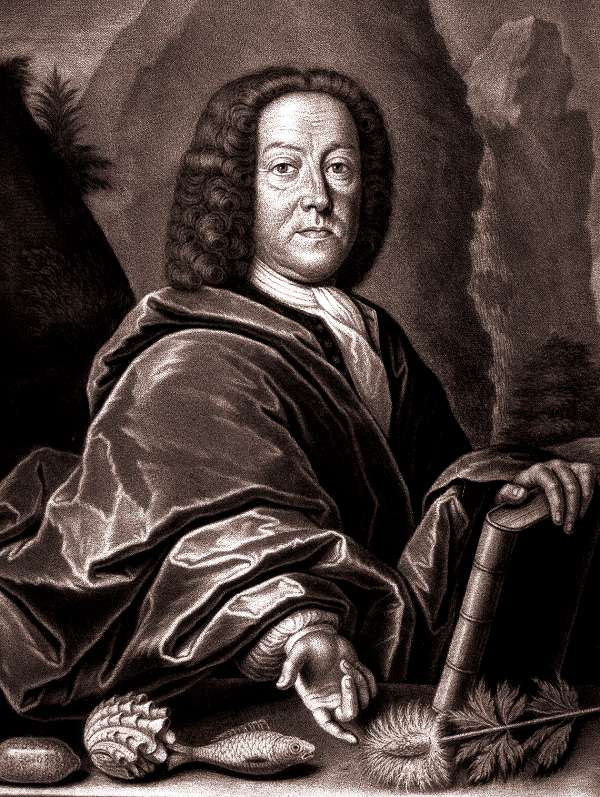
The most common species of the genus is named after Johann Jakob Scheuchzer.

The most abundant species of this genus, Macroneuropteris scheuchzeri, has had a long taxonomic history since it was first recognized in fossils found near Oxford, England by Edward Lhuyd in 1669. He referred to these leaves as Phyllites mineralis. It is illustrated and noted in Lhuyd's Lythophylacii Britannici Ichnographia, an early manuscript on English fossils published in 1699 with the financial help of Isaac Newton. The species was further described in the Herbarium Diluvianum written in 1723 by the botanist Johann Jakob Scheuchzer. Nearly hundred years after Scheuchzer's death, the species was renamed Neuropteris scheuchzeri by professor Hoffmann in Christian Keferstein's 1826 atlas of German Geology, Deutschland, geognostisch-geologisch dargestellt. In the 1800s, similar fossilized foliage was found in North America. The names Neuropteris cordata var. angustifolia, Neuropteris angustifolia, Neuropteris acutifolia, Neuropteris hirsuta, Neuropteris decipiens, and Odontopteris subcuneata were used for these but are now all considered to be forms of Macroneuropteris scheuchzeri. The genus was taxonomically refined in 1989 through epidermal research led by C. J. Cleal. Based on that work, the genus Neuropteris was divided into four genera, Neuropteris, Macroneuropteris, Neurocallipteris, and Laveineopteris.

== Description ==
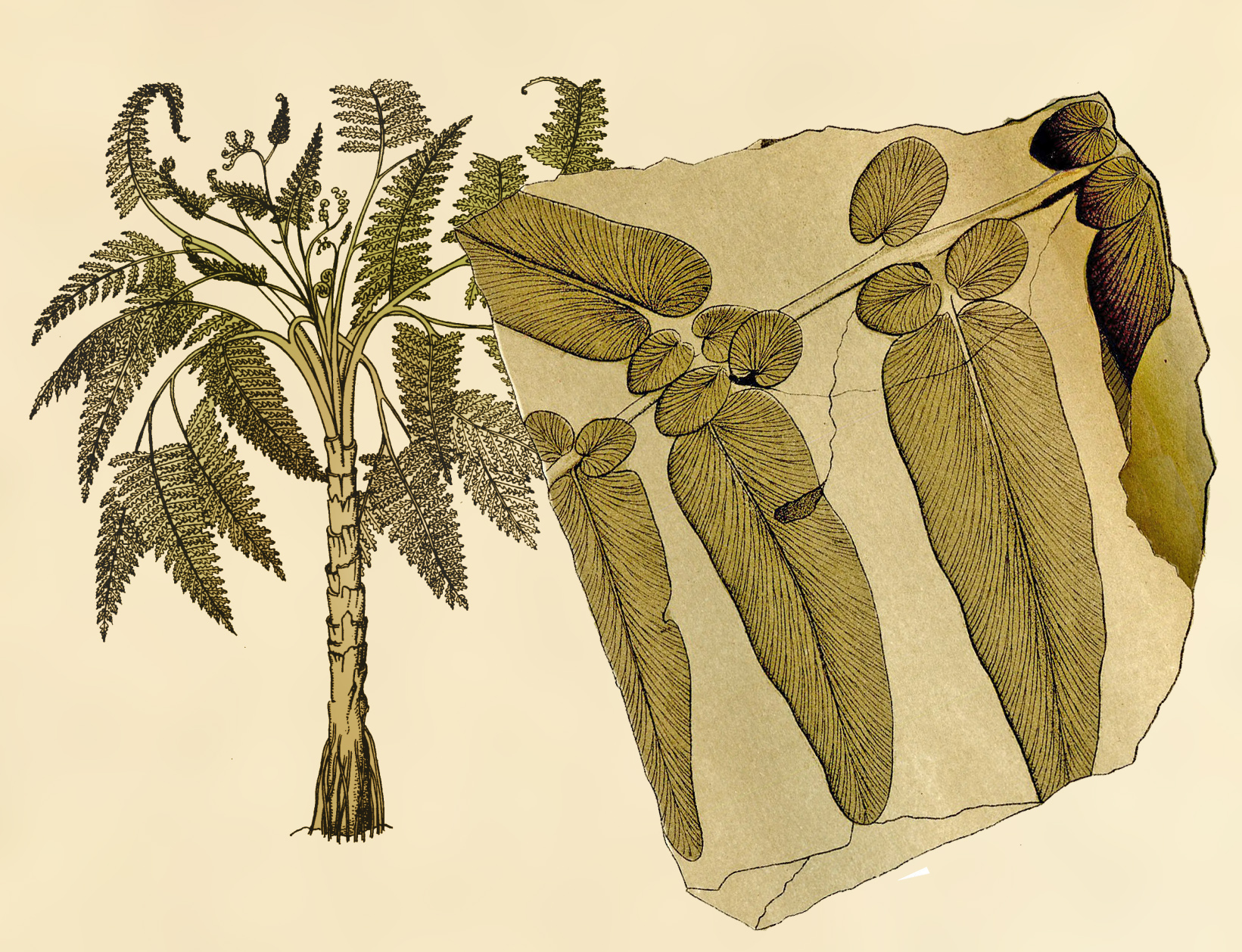
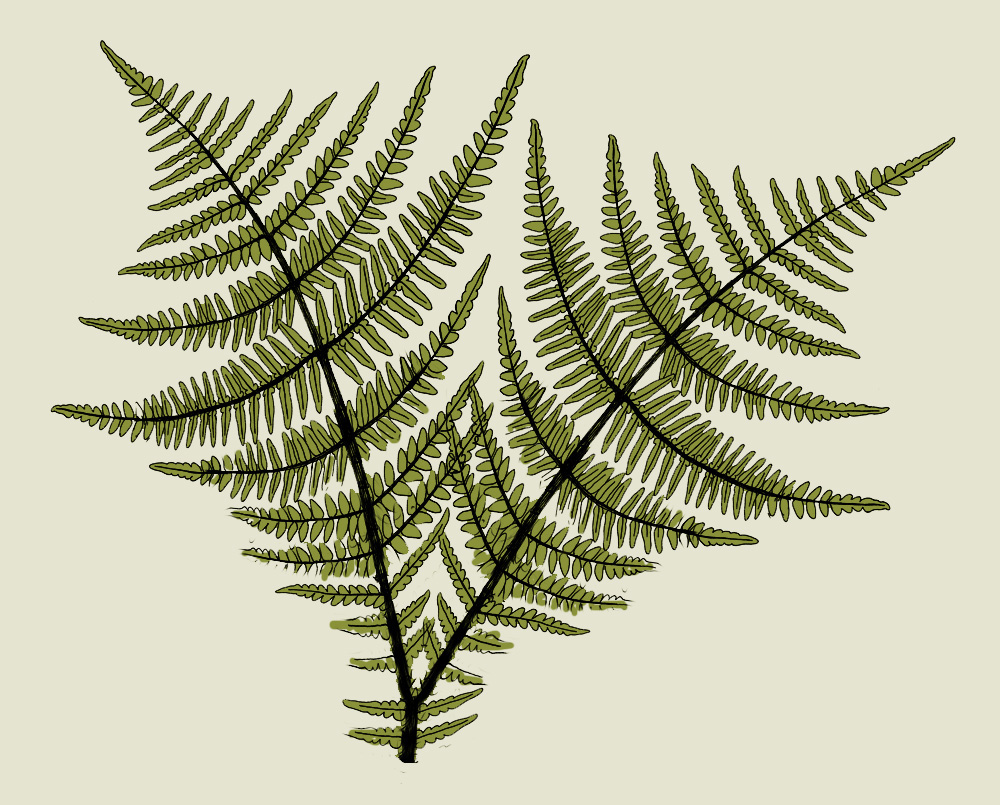
Macroneuropteris scheuchzeri leaves and reconstruction of a generalized medullosalean tree. On right, an illustration showing the large leaf of Macroneuropteris scheuchzeri dividing at the base into two bipinnately compound halves.

The genus Macroneuropteris is used in some cases as a leaf organ taxon to refer to just the foliage of these trees. And in other cases, it is used to refer to the entire tree. The genus is associated with the stems and trunks of the wood organ taxon Medullosa noei. Together these fossils describe parts of a medullosalean seed fern tree that was likely about 8–10 meters tall with an upright trunk with large compound frond-like leaves.

=== Foliage ===
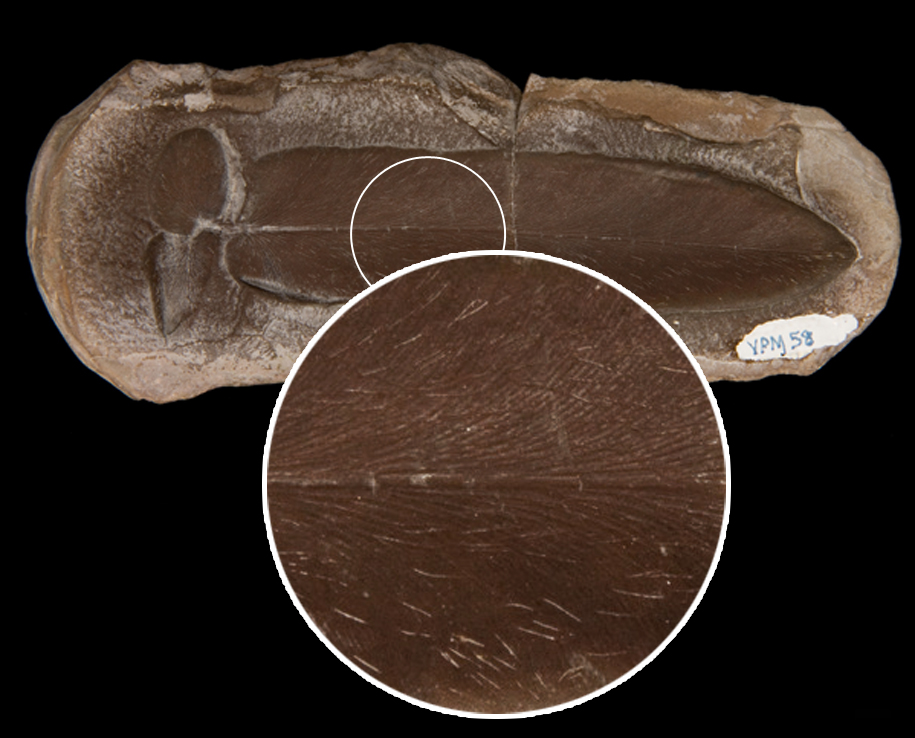
Macroneuropteris scheuchzeri specimen clearly showing the hair-like structures on the leaves.

The foliage of the Macroneuropteris species consists of very large frond-like leaves that are bipartite (divided in two) near the base, forming two large bipinnately compound parts (see illustration). These compound fronds can be as large as several meters.

In Macroneuropteris, each individual leaflet or pinnule of the compound frond were also notably large. In fact, the species M. scheuchzeri's pinnules were the largest of any seed plant of the Carboniferous Period. Individual pinnules are typically lanceolate with a round base. They have been found to be as long as 12 cm. These individual leaflets are often found fossilized by themselves separated from the frond. They have been inferred by some to be deciduous. In the famous Mazon Creek Fossil Beds of Illinois, these leaflets are one of the most commonly found plant fossils. The leaves have thick cuticles, sunken stomata, dense trichomes, and large hair-like structures. These foliar characteristics combined with the spiny stem structure where the leaflets drop, and the potential deciduous nature have led to many authors suggesting a xeromorphic tendency in the tree. Such adaptations may have allowed the genus to dominate the late Carboniferous landscape as other plants like Lepidodendrales steadily declined.

=== 'Hairs' on the leaves ===
The presence of hair-like structures on the pinnules of Macroneuropteris has been noted since the mid 1800s. It has become an important taxonomic characteristic particularly for M. scheuchzeri, which has abundant epicuticular hair that can reach a maximum length of 1000 mm. It had been assumed that these were trichomes on the leaves and may have been used to help the plant conserve water. Recent molecular studies by Erwin L. Zodrow have discovered that although there are trichomes on the species of Macroneuropteris, the more noticeable dark 'hair-like' structures are likely not trichomes and may not be directly attached to the leaves. He suggests that these structures are material in the wax of the cuticle demonstrating a dynamic molecular Self-assembly.

The hair-like structures of M. scheuchzeri (1) are not organically attached to the abaxial surface; (2) differ spectrochemically from the organic material of the lamina; (3) are composed, in contrast with the trichomes, of relatively long, unbranched aliphatic (polymythelinic) hydrocarbon chains [CH_{2}]_{n}, and (4) are acellular and black, unlike true trichomes of the species that are multicellular. Overall, the sum-total of these experimental results supports the postulate for dynamic molecular self-assembly. For this reason the term "extracuticular deposit" is proposed, reflecting the origin and emergent nature of such hair-like structures in the abaxial pinnule.

— Erwin L. Zodrow, "Molecular self-assembly: Hypothesized for 'hair' of Macroneuropteris scheuchzeri", International Journal of Coal Geology

=== Reconstruction ===
Reconstructions of the entire Macroneuropteris trees have been based on various separate fossil parts. As noted above, the stems and trunks are usually referred to as Medullosa noei. Early attempts to reconstruct the entire tree were somewhat limited by this fragmentary material. One well-known reconstruction was illustrated for Stewart and Delevoryas paper in 1956. The illustration has been the basis for many reconstructions of the Medullosa noei tree.

However, a complete Macroneuropteris tree was found in growth position in Nova Scotia that differs from the idealized reconstruction. This fossil tree was extensively studied by Howard Falcon-Lang who found many characteristics that differed from the previous reconstructions.

The fossil tree has a sharply tapering trunk surrounded in its lower part by a large number of downward-recurved senescent petioles, which form a skirt. Petioles borne in an upright or horizontal position, interpreted as fronds that were still photosynthetically active when buried, are confined to the uppermost preserved part of the tree. Adapted to growth in rapidly aggrading coastal wetlands, the skirt of Macroneuropteris scheuchzeri probably acted to prop up the trunk while additionally trapping large mounds of mud around the base of the tree and stabilizing coastal wetlands. The tree had a sprawling habit and a maximum height of about 2 m. Similar, but smaller, trees found in adjacent beds probably represent juvenile specimens of the same species.

— Howard Falcon-Lang, "A Macroneuropteris scheuchzeri tree preserved in growth position", Atlantic Geology

== Reproduction ==
Seed and pollen organs have not yet been found directly attached to the foliage of Macroneuropteris. For that reason, a variety of fossilized reproductive parts could be possible matches. However, a lot of evidence points toward some type of trigonocarpus as the seed/ovlule and Codonotheca caduca as the male pollen organ.

=== Ovules/seeds ===
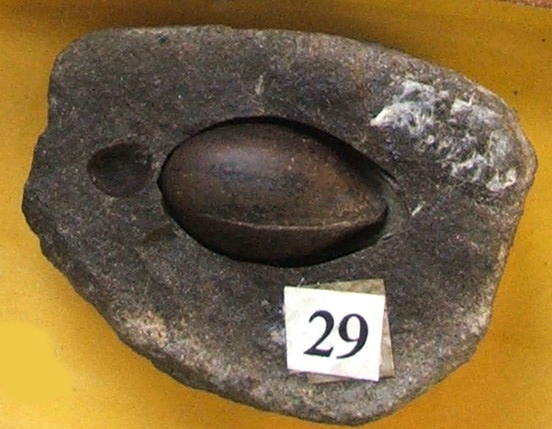
Trigonocarpus, the seed/ovule of Medullosales such as Macroneuropteris

In 1938, W. A. Bell studied the Sydney Coalfield in Nova Scotia, and suggested that the large fossilized seeds called Trigonocarpus noeggerati could be the ovules of Macroneuropteris scheuchzeri. Erwin Zodrow in 2002 also noted that this ovule fossil was commonly in physical association with M. scheuchzeri foliage. Specimens of Trigonocarpus can be quite large. The largest recorded was 10 cm and has been noted as the largest ovule produced by a non-angiosperm seed-plant. Some have noted that the large size of these seeds may have allowed them to float, like small coconuts, to be distributed in these coastal mangrove-like areas as well as inland wetland forests. Their three-part symmetry gives them their name. A tube-like opening at the top brought pollen into the ovule. Pachytesta is a term that is also used for this type of seed/ovule.

=== Male pollen organs ===
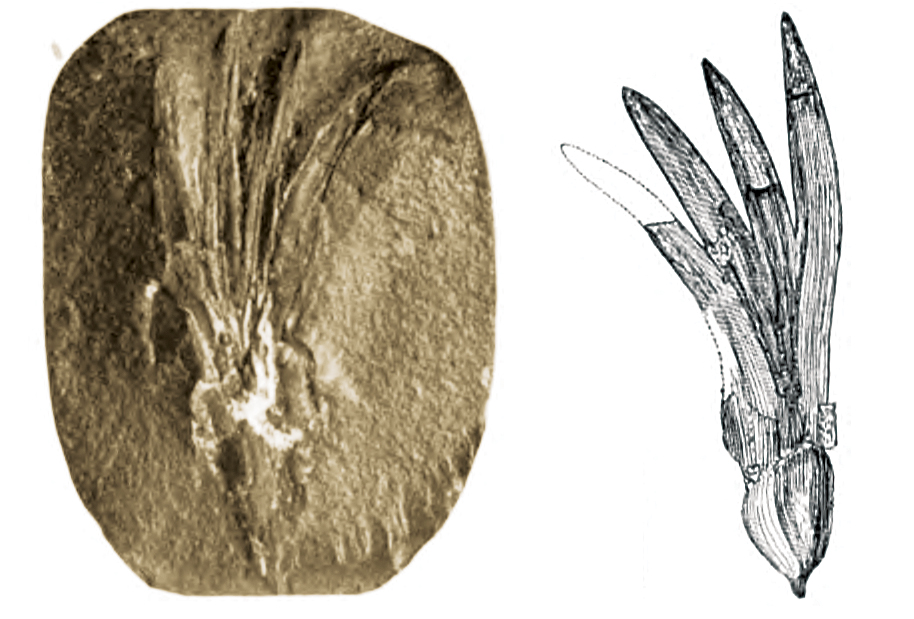
The male pollen organ called Codonotheca. This specimen was identified and named by E. H. Sellards in 1903. Sellards illustration of the specimen is on the right.

As early a 1903, the fossilized male pollen organs called Codonotheca caduca were speculated to be from plants bearing Macroneuropteris scheuchzeri foliage. In 1907, E.H. Sellards further noted this connection. In the late 1960s, both Laveine (1967) and Darrah (1969) reinforced this association. The pollen found in the fossilized Codonotheca caduca are monolete and exceptionally large (200–550 μm).

=== Possible insect pollination ===
The large size of the monolete pollen of Macroneuropteris and other seed ferns suggests that they may not have been well adapted to wind dispersal. This raises speculation about the possibility of insect pollination. One of those possibilities is Arthropleura, a very large millipede of the Carboniferous. Scott and Taylor (1983) studied seed-fern pollen on the plates of Arthropleura and thought they might have a role in pollination. W. A. Shear and others have noted that this is very unlikely due to the size of Arthropleura. Other insects of the Carboniferous however may have been pollinators. The cycads, a modern seed plant with some similar affinities to seed ferns, were previously thought to only be pollinated by wind. New studies have confirmed the role of Thrips and other beetles in their pollination. This form of pollination is now known to be present as far back as the Cretaceous. A similar relationship may have occurred between these seed ferns and some Carboniferous insects.

== Distribution ==
Macroneuropteris scheuchzeri is a very recognizable species in the Late Carboniferous, and is found throughout what was known as Euramerica, a large supercontinent that included present-day North America, Europe, and northern Africa. M. macrophylla is found in many of the same locations. Because of their similarities, the two are easily misidentified. M. britannica and M. subauriculata are found mostly in Europe. In general, Macroneuropteris had a worldwide distribution over the tropical equatorial world of the late Carboniferous.

The genus ranges from the Bashkirian stage of the Carboniferous to the early Asselian stage of the Permian. A range that is approximately 18 million years (approximately 298 to 316 million years ago). M. scheuchzeri became particularly common in the Moscovian stage. In two Moscovian-age (approximately 309 mya) fossil locations, Mazon Creek fossil beds in Illinois, U.S.A and Okmulgee in Oklahoma, U.S.A., Macroneuropteris is exceptionally abundant. Along with the leaves of Psaronius, it comprises nearly 60% of the flora in these fossil beds.

It is commonly found in the fossils above coal seams. It has been noted that the coal that formed during an evenly wet climate is dominated by lepidodendrales, and the layer above the coal formed during a transitional and more varied climate is dominated by Macroneuropteris and the tree fern Psaronius. The foliar adaptations described earlier in this article may have given Macroneuropteris an advantage during these transitional times.

As Lepidodendrons declined in the late carboniferous, Macroneuropteris continued to be common and even became a dominant element in these forests. An extinction event called the Carboniferous Rainforest Collapse occurred during the Kasimovian stage. This event decimated many of the Lepidodendrons. It also affected Macroneuropteris, however, the genus was able to recover quicker than other species after this event and became a dominant part of a new forest ecosystems alongside the tree fern Psaronius.

Toward the end of the Carboniferous, the climate of Euramerica became increasingly dryer. Macroneuropteris disappeared from the fossil record for the most part. It was limited to isolated wet areas. It continued into the early Asselian stage of the Permian in these isolated locations.

== See also ==
- Coal forest
- Medullosales
