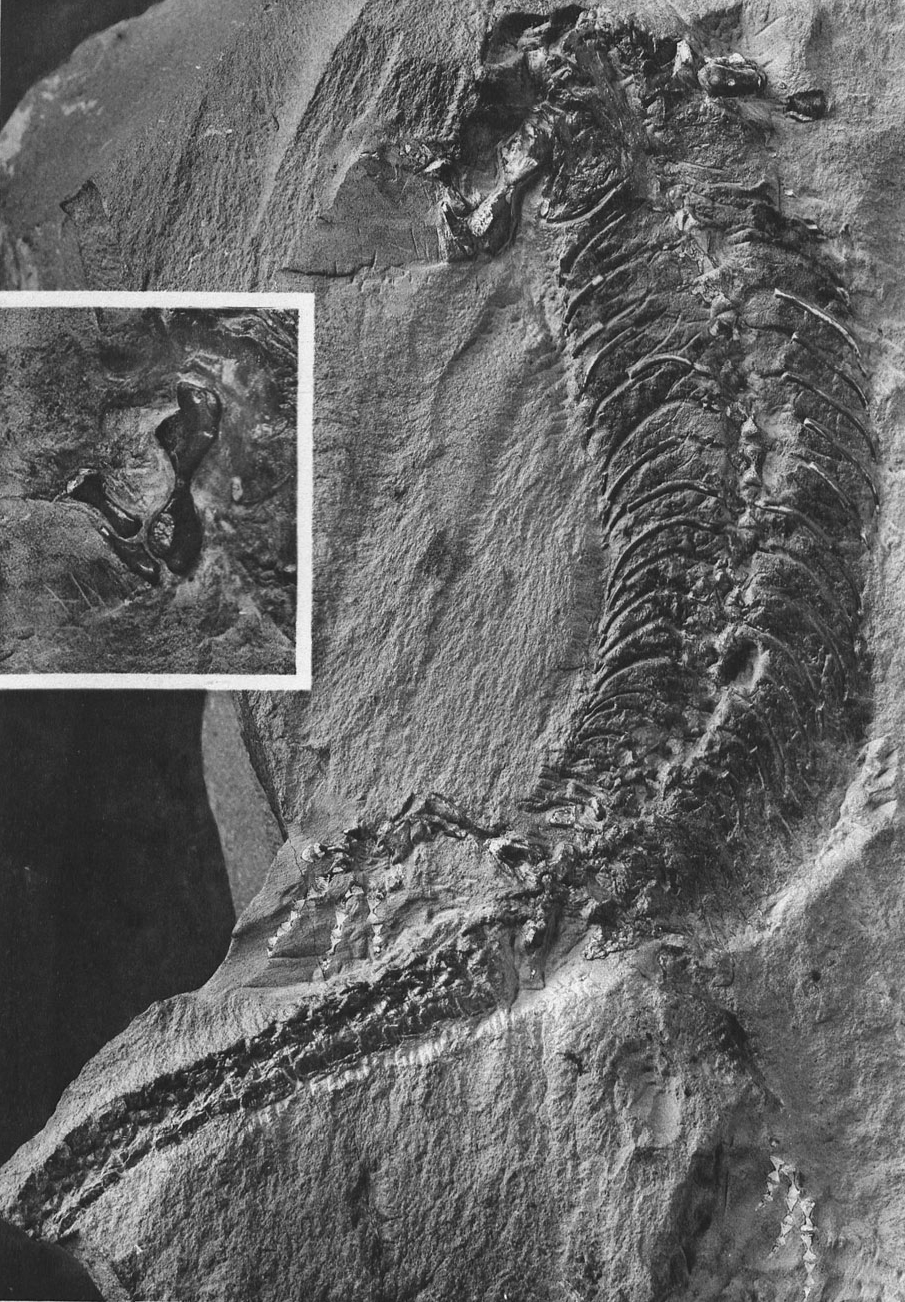
- The holotype of Sauravus costei

Scientific classification
- Kingdom: Animalia
- Phylum: Chordata
- Order: †Nectridea
- Family: †Scincosauridae
- Genus: †Sauravus; Thévenin, 1906

Type species
- †Sauravus costei Thévenin, 1906

Species
- †S. costei Thévenin, 1906 †S. cambrayi Thévenin, 1910 †S. spinosus? Civet, 1982

= Sauravus =

Sauravus Temporal range: Late Carboniferous to Early Permian, 305–286 Ma

Extinct genus of tetrapodomorphs

Sauravus is an extinct genus of nectridean tetrapodomorphs within the family Scincosauridae.

== Species ==
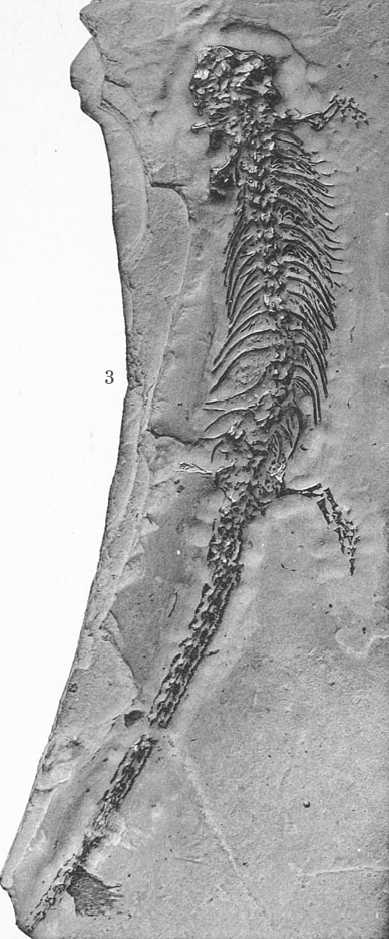
The holotype of Sauravus cambrayi

The type species of Sauravus, Sauravus costei, is known from Blanzy, a town in the Saône-et-Loire department of France. This town and its adjacent community Montceau-les-Mines possess a Lagerstätte containing abundant Carboniferous fossils. Fossils from the Montceau-les-Mines lagerstätte are believed to have been from the Stephanian B stage of the Late Carboniferous, approximately 305 to 304 million years ago.

Sauravus cambrayi is known from Les Télots, a mine near Autun, Saône-et-Loire, France. Télots is the type locality of the Autunian stage, a period of time which is believed to correspond to part of the early Permian period. The geological formation which Télots fossils belong to is known as the Millery Formation. The specific part of the Permian which this formation belongs to was unclear for many years. In 2014, Schneider et al. suggested that the Millery Formation dated to the middle Artinskian age, about 290 to 286 million years ago.

Sauravus spinosus is a rename of Scincosaurus spinosus, a Montceau-les-Mines scincosaurid described by C. Civet in 1982. Although that author considered the species to belong to Scincosaurus, in 1994 Jean-Michel Dutuit and D. Heyler considered it a species of Sauravus.
