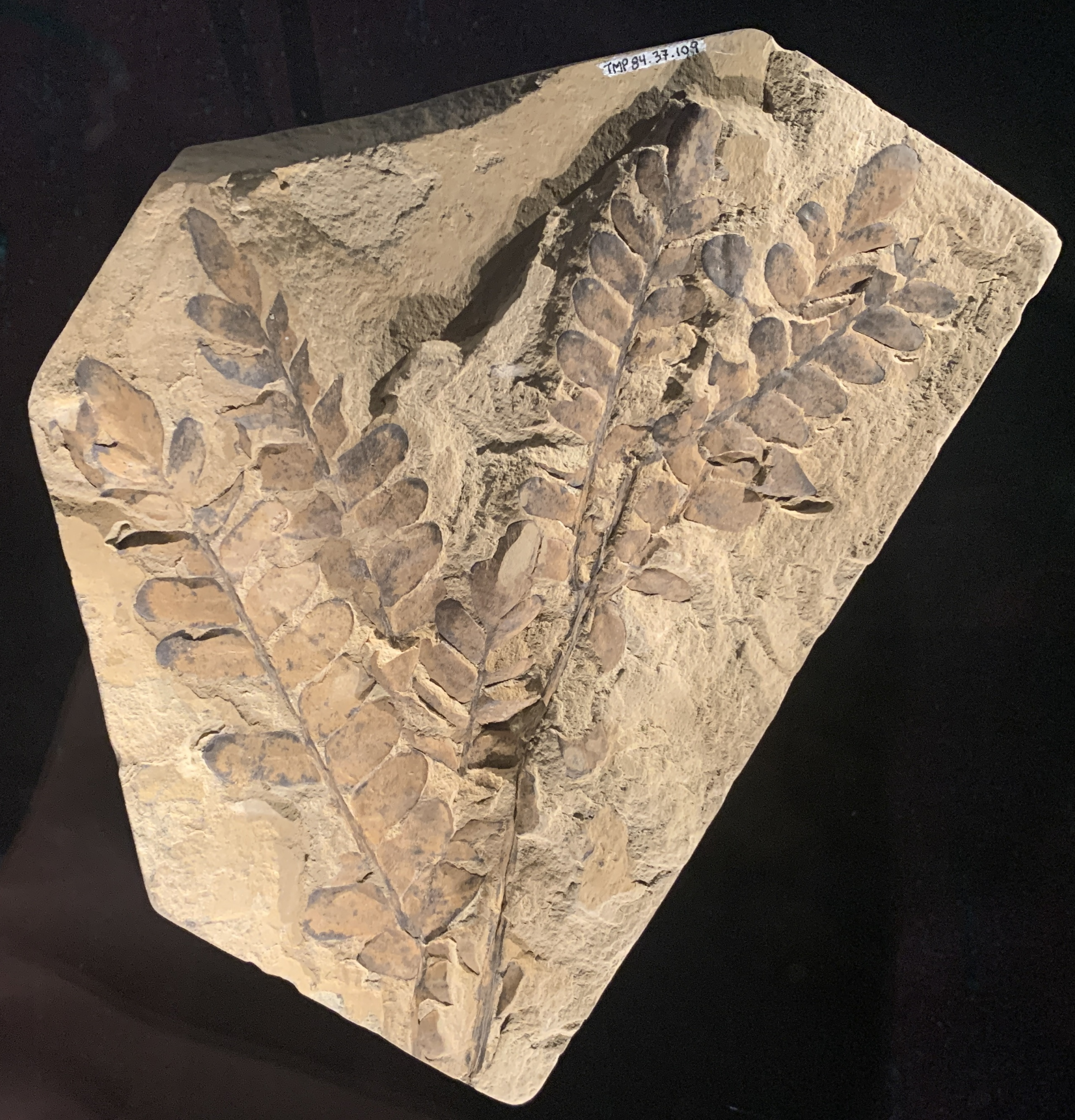
- Neuropteris ovata, late Carboniferous, Kansas. At the Royal Tyrrell Museum of Palaeontology.

Scientific classification
- Kingdom: Plantae
- Clade: Tracheophytes
- Division: †Pteridospermatophyta
- Order: †Medullosales
- Family: †Neurodontopteridaceae
- Genus: †Neuropteris; Desv.

= Neuropteris =

Neuropteris Temporal range: Late Carboniferous

Extinct genus of plants

Neuropteris is an extinct seed fern that existed in the Carboniferous period, known only from fossils.

== Gallery ==
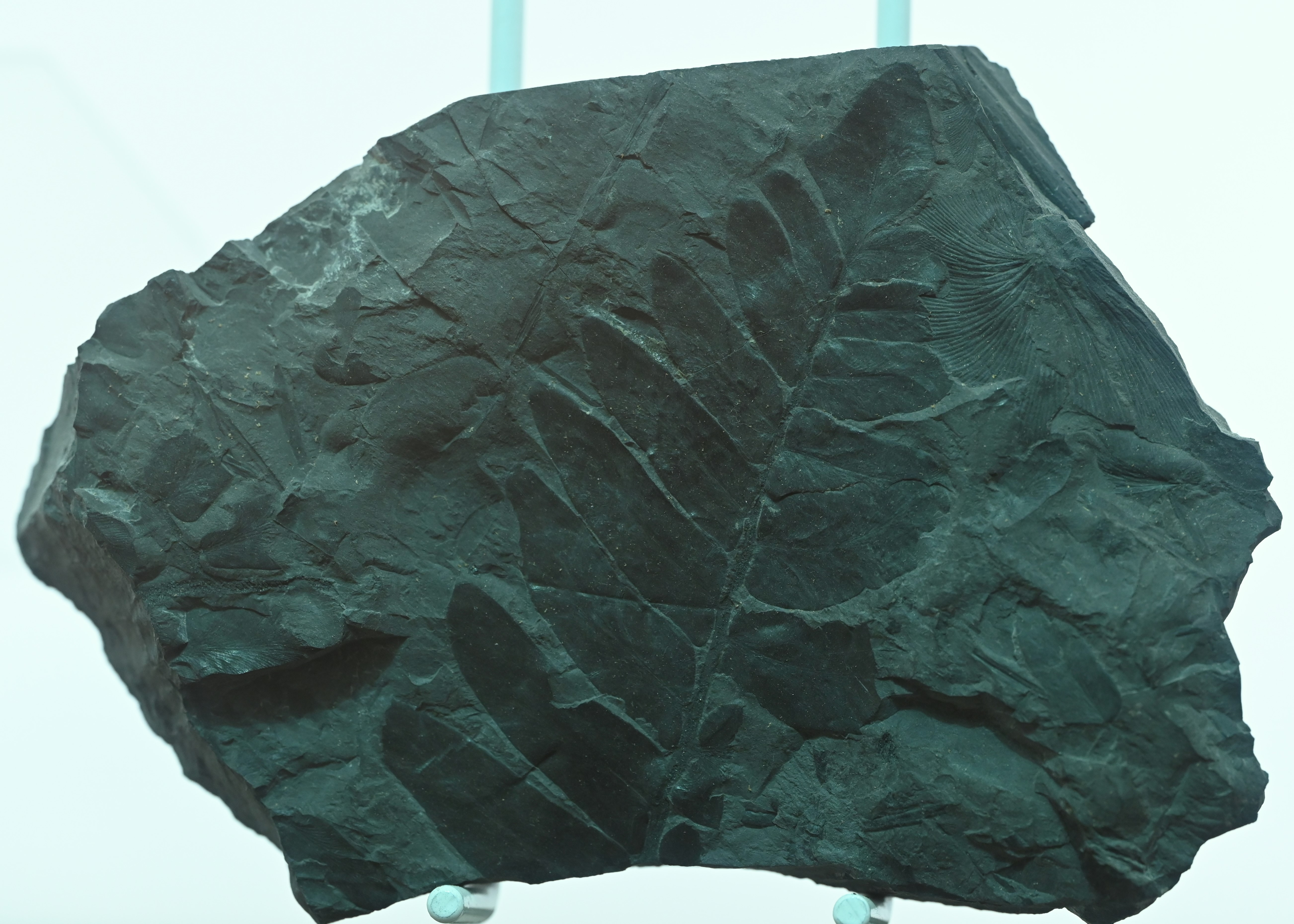
N. flexuosa

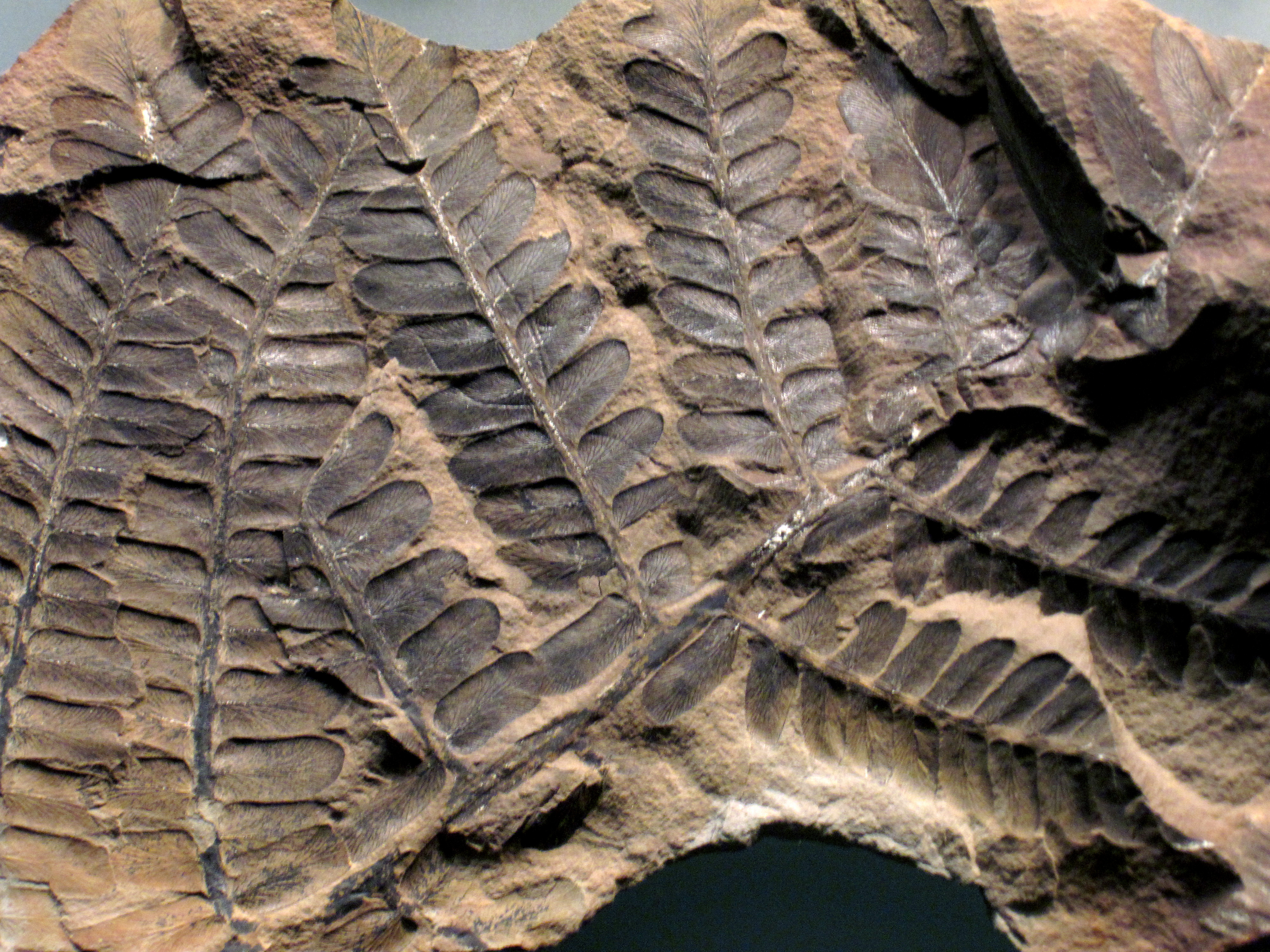
N. flexuosa

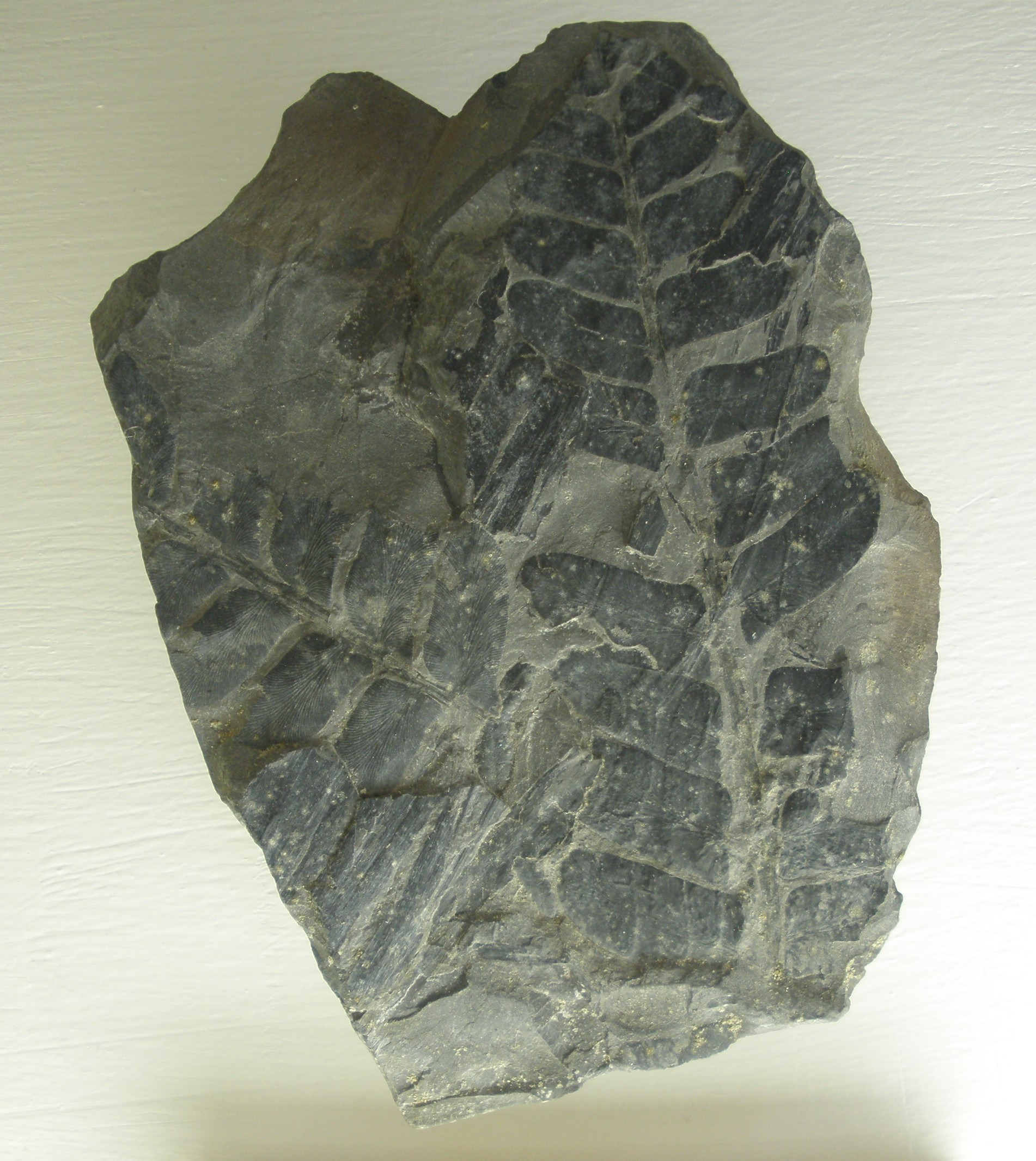
N. gigantea

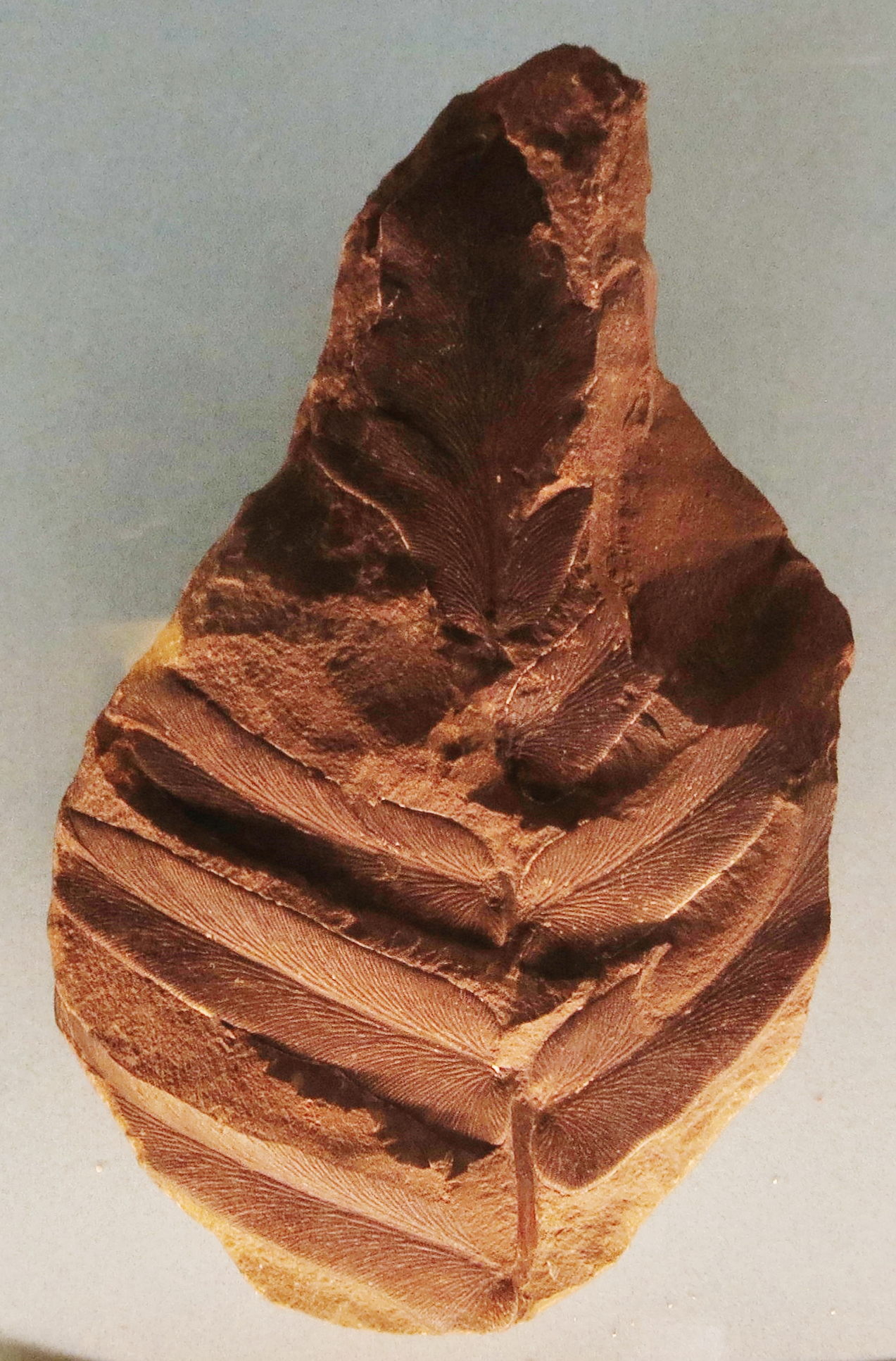
N. scheuchzeri

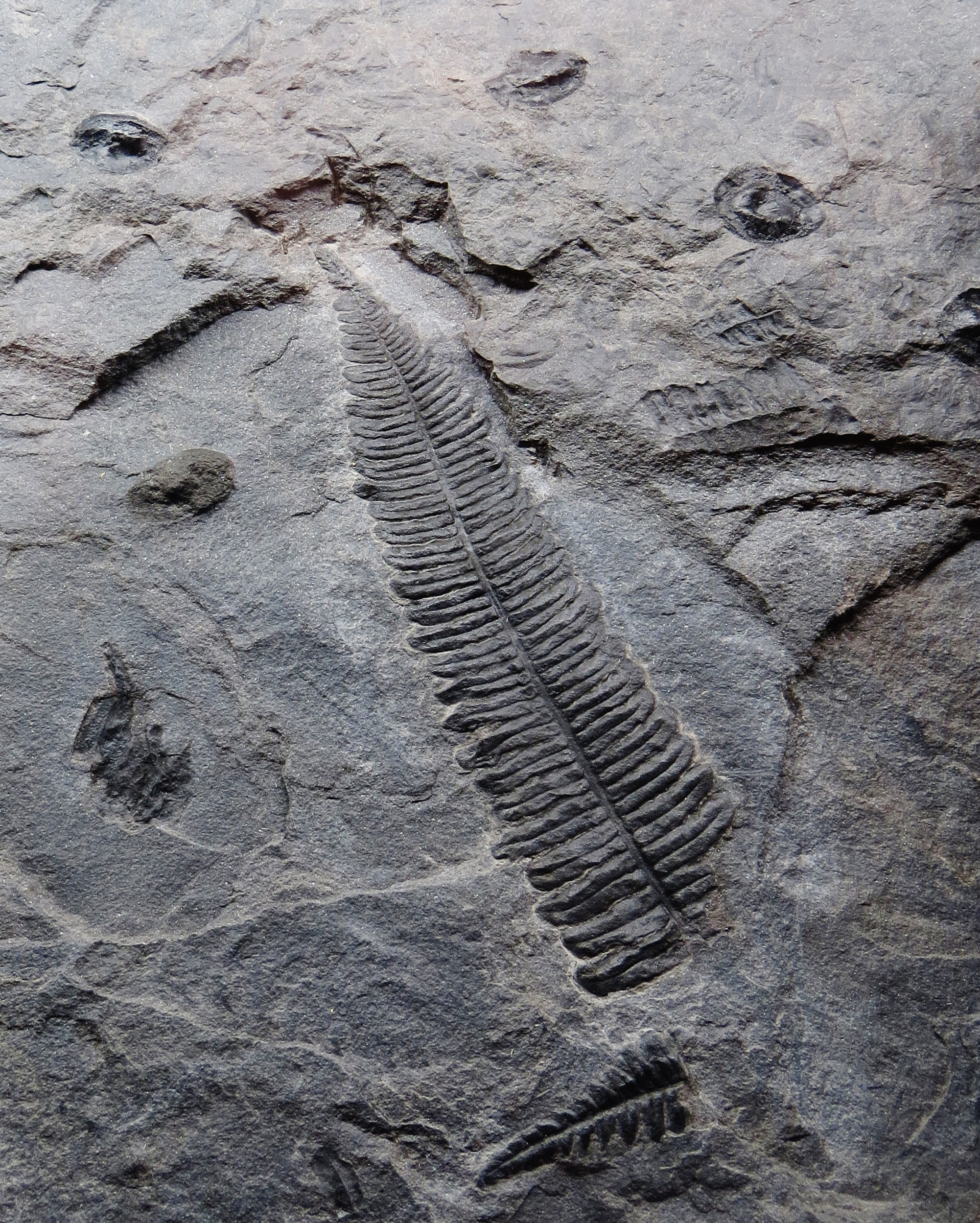
N. schlehani

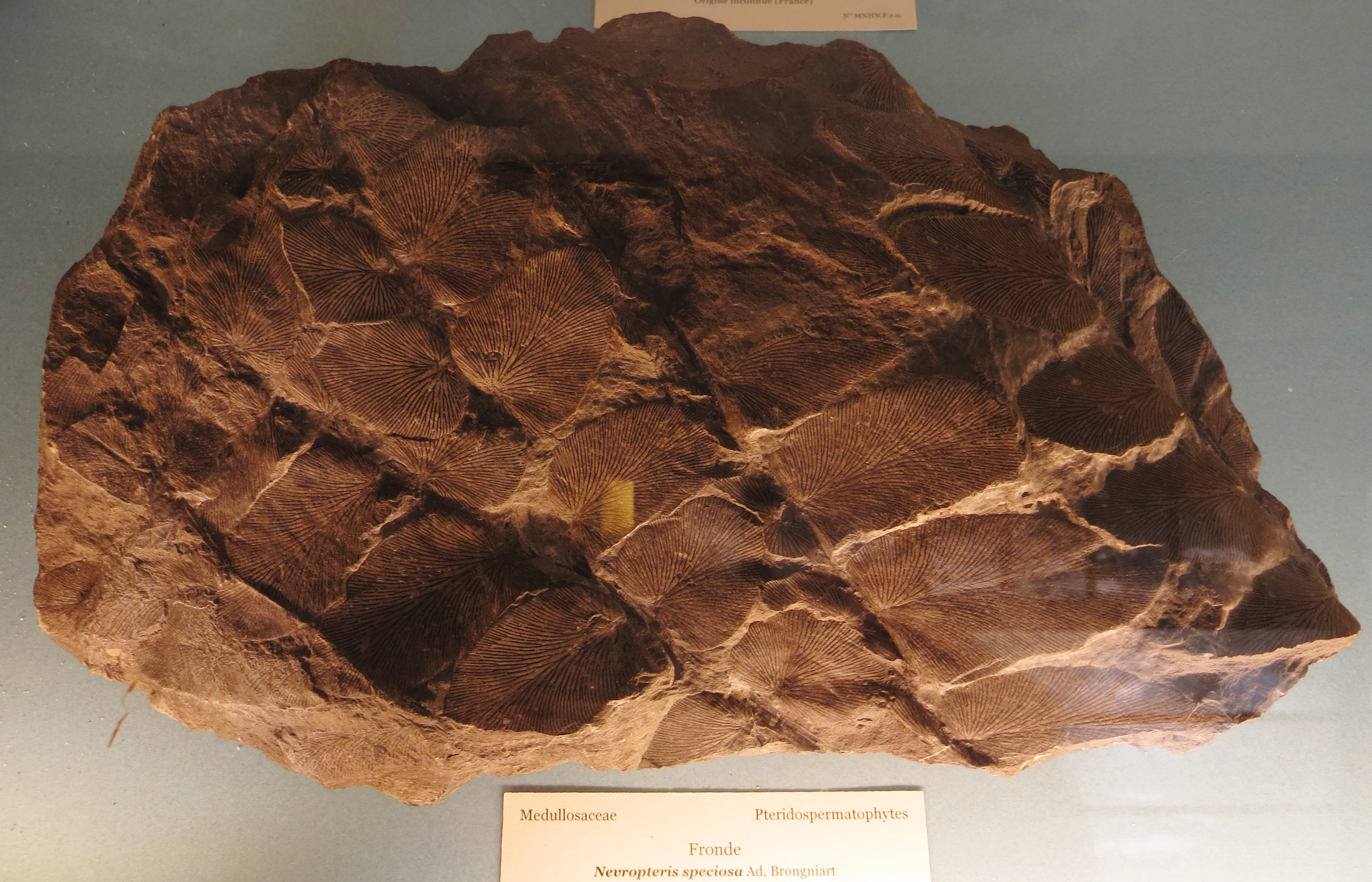
N. speciosa

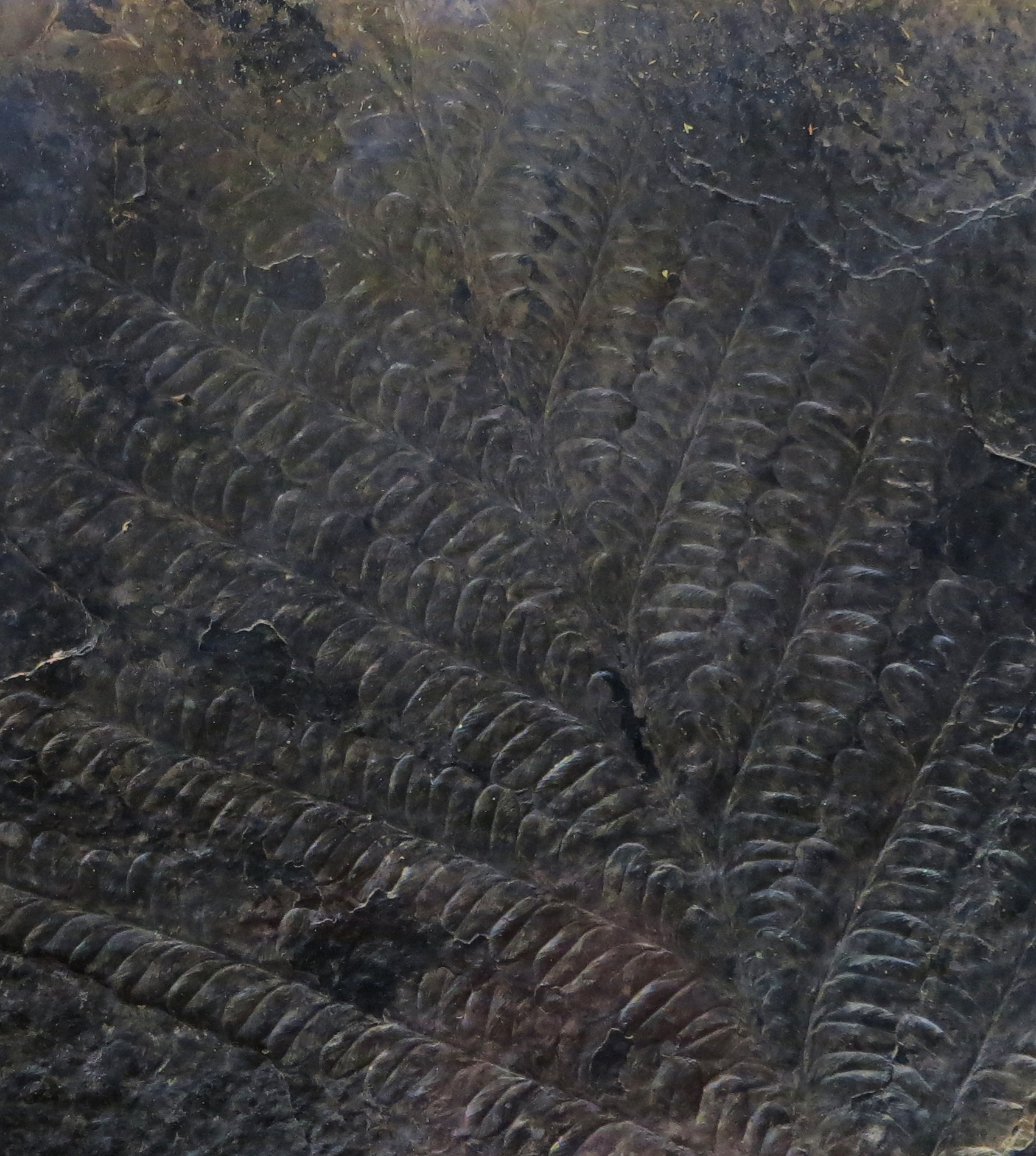
N. tetraphylla

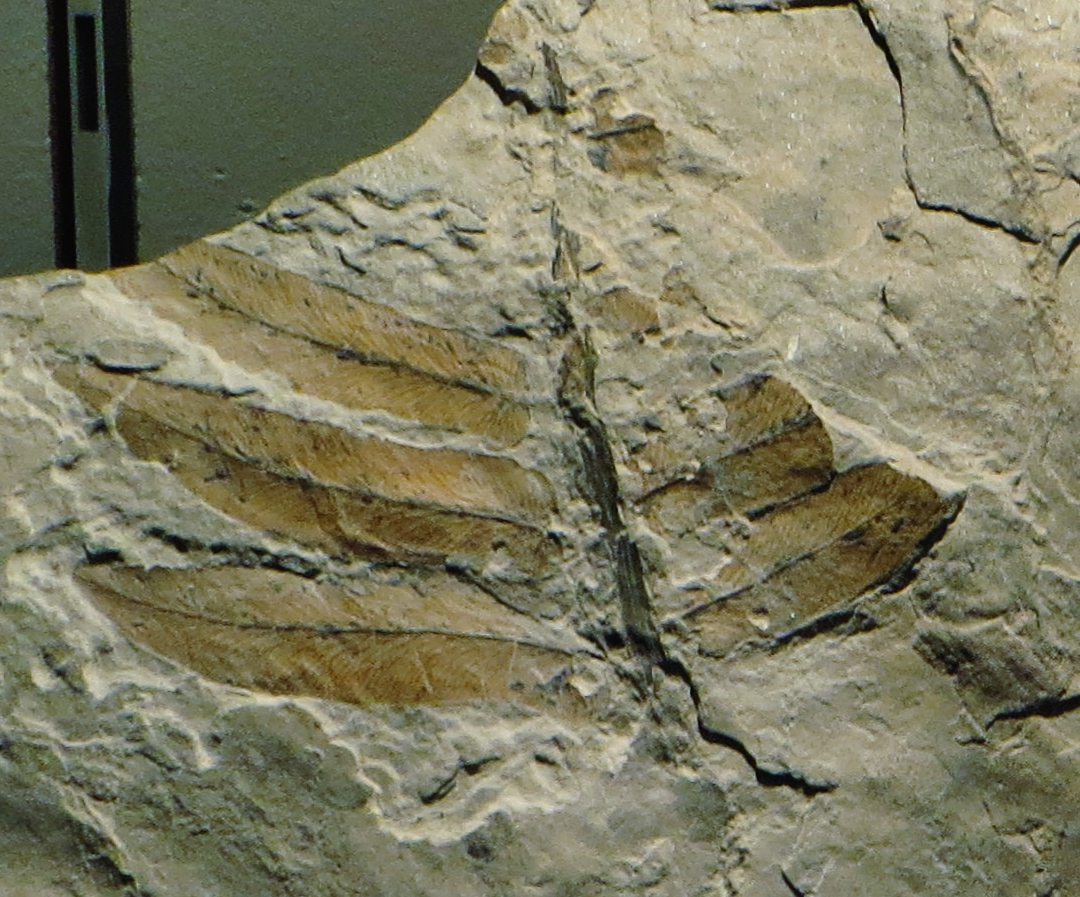
N. pseudoblissi

== See also ==
- Coal forest
- Macroneuropteris
