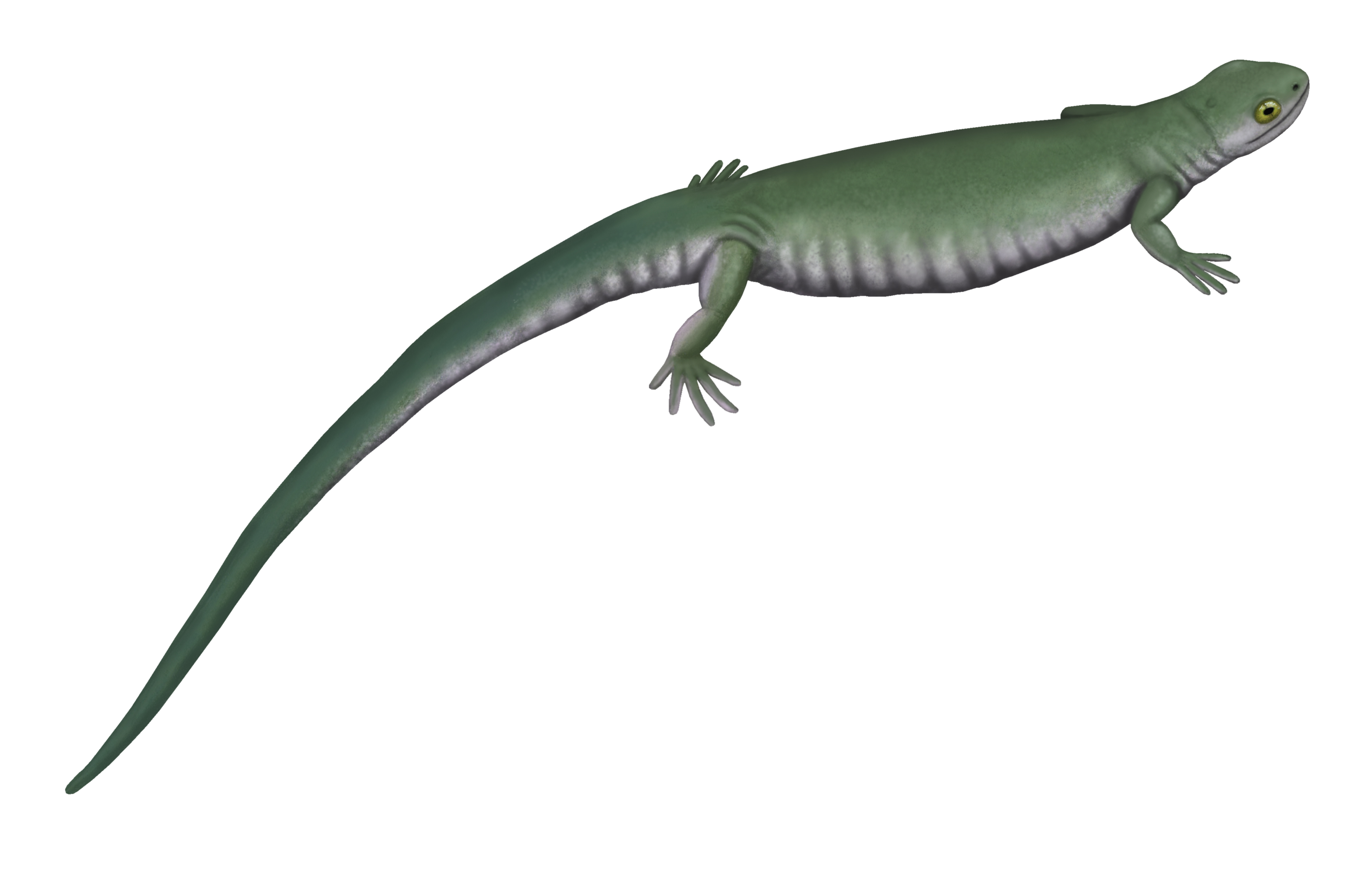
- Life restoration of Scincosaurus crassus

Scientific classification
- Domain: Eukaryota
- Kingdom: Animalia
- Phylum: Chordata
- Clade: Sarcopterygii
- Clade: Tetrapodomorpha
- Order: †Nectridea
- Family: †Scincosauridae; Jaeckel, 1909

= Scincosauridae =

Scincosauridae Temporal range: Late Carboniferous

Extinct family of tetrapodomorphs

The Scincosauridae are an extinct family of nectridean tetrapodomorphs. It includes the genera Scincosaurus and Sauravus. Unlike most other nectrideans, scincosaurids are thought to have been terrestrial.
