= Medullosa =

Medullosa Temporal range: Serpukhovian - Cisuralian

Scientific classification
- Kingdom: Plantae
- Clade: Tracheophytes
- Division: †Pteridospermatophyta
- Order: †Medullosales
- Family: †Alethopteridaceae
- Genus: †Medullosa; B. von Cotta (1832)

Species
- †Medullosa anglica; †Medullosa centrofilis; †Medulosa endocentrica; †Medullosa geriensis; †Medullosa gigas; †Medullosa leuckartii; †Medullosa noei; †Medullosa olseniae; †Medullosa porosa; †Medullosa primaeva; †Medullosa pusilla; †Medullosa solmsii; †Medullosa steinii; †Medullosa stellata; †Medullosa thomsonii

Extinct genus of seed fern

Medullosa is an extinct genus of Pteridospermatophyta from the Late Mississippian to the Early Permian. The genus has a distribution across Europe and North America, with only two species (M. primaeva and M. anglica) having been found on both continents.
