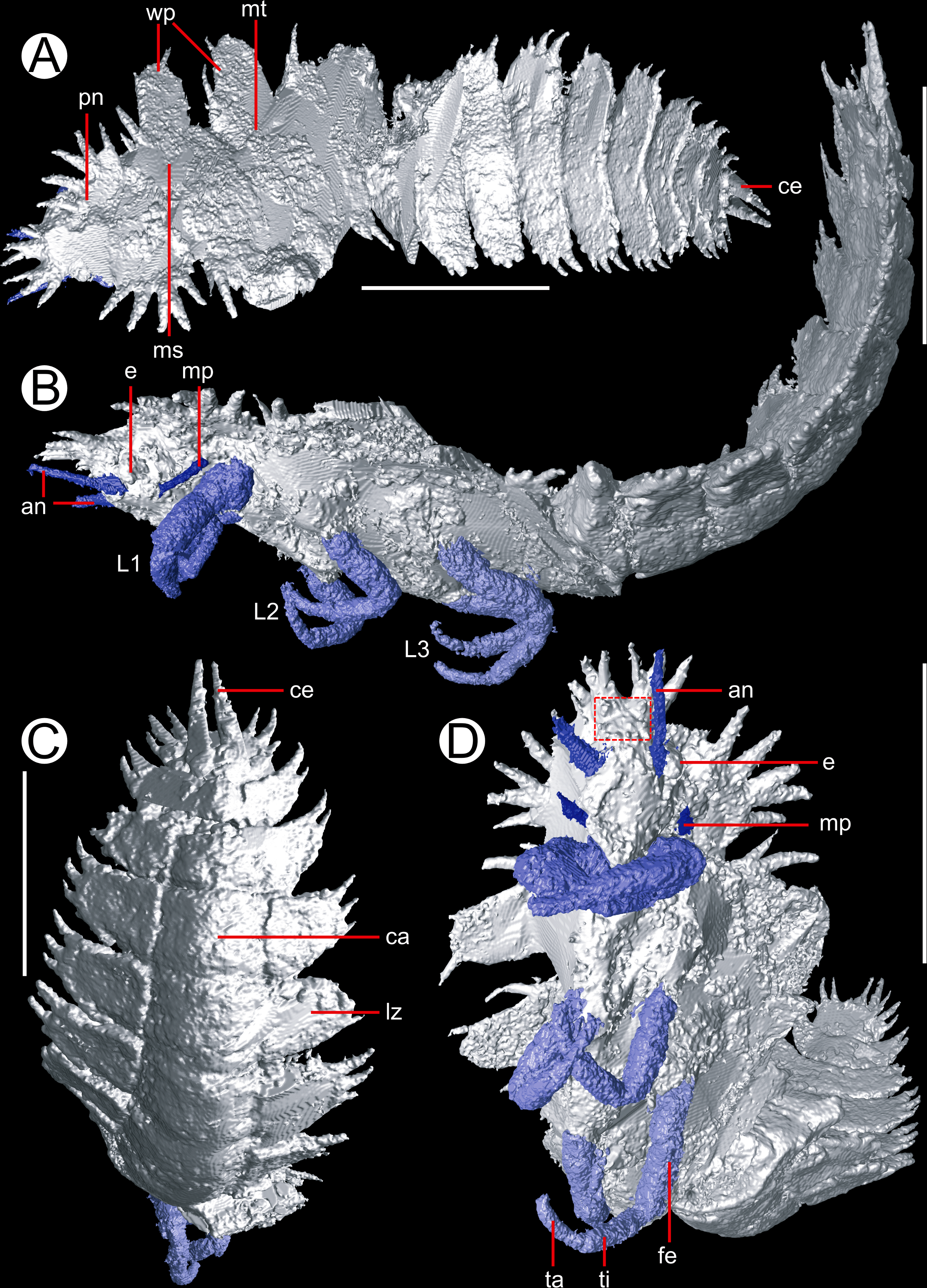
- Fossil of Anebos

Scientific classification
- Kingdom: Animalia
- Phylum: Arthropoda
- Class: Insecta
- Subclass: Pterygota
- Infraclass: Neoptera
- Cohort: Polyneoptera
- Genus: †Anebos; Garwood et al, 2012
- Species: †A. phrixos

Binomial name
- †Anebos phrixos Garwood et al, 2012

= Anebos =

Anebos Temporal range: Stephanian

Extinct genus of enigmatic insect

Anebos phrixos (from Greek anebos "young" and phrixos "bristling", referring to its numerous spines and the only fossil being a nymph) is an enigmatic species of insect from the Carboniferous Montceau-les-Mines lagerstätte of France. It is the only species within the genus Anebos.

== Description ==
Anebos is known from a young nymph roughly 2 cm (0.79 in) long. Its body is covered in many large spines, with a row extending along the sides of the body. Its head is opisthognathous (mandibles pointing backward) and tucked under the pronotum (first segment of the body), with an array of tubercles marking out a square shape. Behind these tubercles a pair of antennae attach, and although their segmentation is unclear they were likely filiform (thread-shaped). Behind these an eye is preserved, although its details are unclear. The mouthparts are seemingly triangular, and end below the first leg pair. The pronotum is narrow with a fan of four side-facing spines. While appendages in front of the leg pair are poorly preserved, what appears to be a maxillary palp can be seen. The limbs are quite short and robust, with long femora and an annulated (ringed) tarsus. These limbs also are bent inwards, however this is likely a "death pose" and therefore not natural.

The mesonotum (middle thorax segment) bears two spines and the forward pair of wing pads, which are directed backwards, have a spine at their tip and are relatively short. The second pair of legs is thinner than the first, with a claw at their tip. The metanotum (last thorax segment) is similar, although its leg pair is longer again and the wing pad bears a spine on the leading edge instead of the tip. At the back of this segment a "triple" spike is preserved. The abdomen contains ten segments which are bent upwards in the fossil. Each of these has three prominent spines (with a fourth on larger segments), with the spines facing further backwards as the segments become smaller. The tenth segment on the other hand only has a small pair of spine-like cerci at its tip.

Anebos was likely terrestrial, as evidenced by the lateral extension of its abdomen not resembling gills, with these instead likely being defensive in nature. It seems to lack haustellate (having a sucking proboscis) mouthparts which implies it did not use a sucking method to feed. Since opisthognathous mandibles are often found in detritivorous taxa, Anebos was likely detritivorous too.

== Classification ==
Anebos is relatively enigmatic, not matching any other insect nymph known. While the mouthparts are poorly preserved, they do not seem to be haustellate, thus ruling out the Palaeodictyopteroidea and hemipterans. It lacks gills and the specialised labium of odonatopteran larvae, so it is likely not within that clade either. The presence of wing pads is incompatible with the fossil being a holometabolan, so a placement in Polyneoptera is most likely, specifically as a stem-orthopteran.
