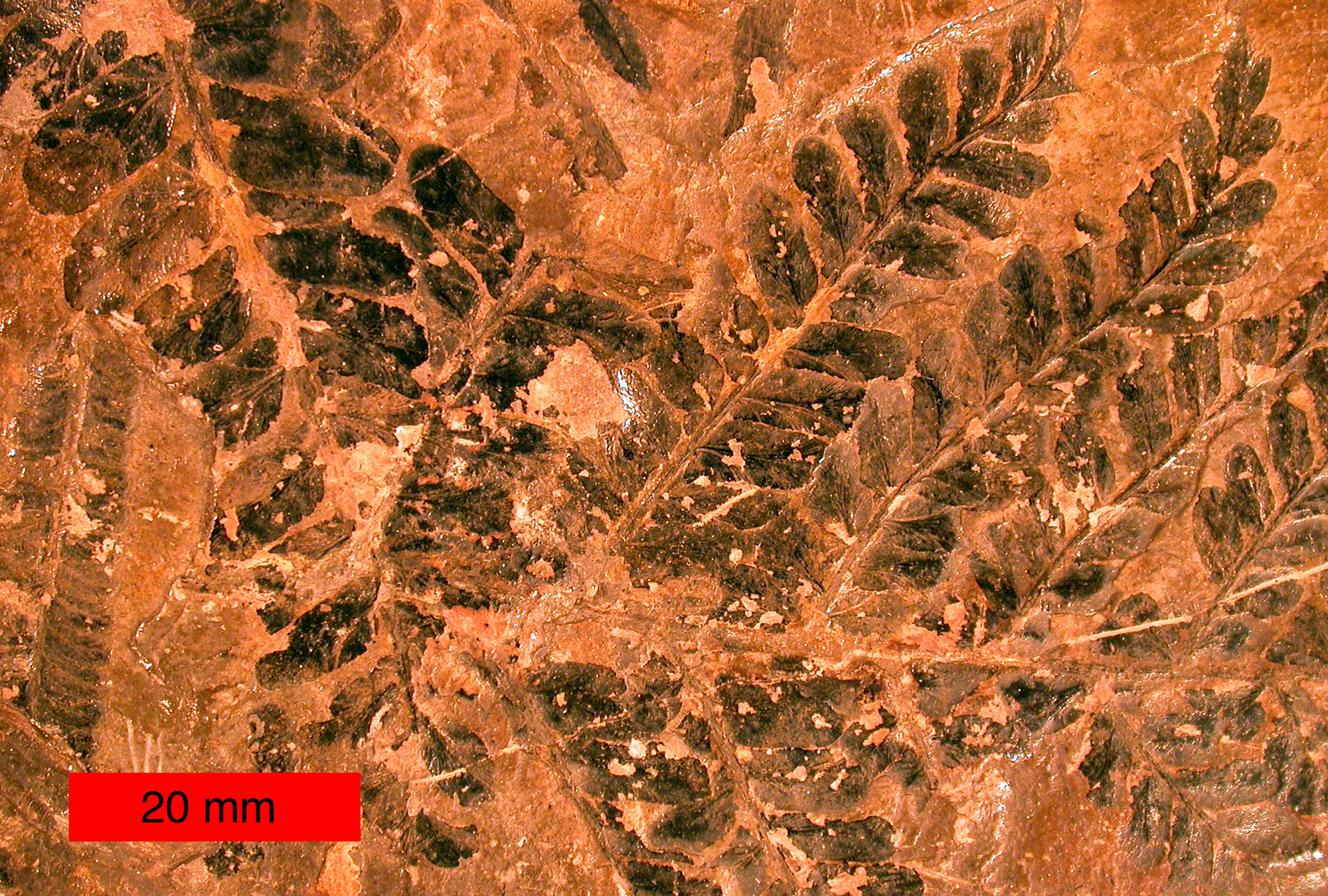
- Neuropteris ovata Hoffmann, Late Carboniferous of northeastern Ohio.

Scientific classification
- Kingdom: Plantae
- Clade: Tracheophytes
- Division: †Pteridospermatophyta
- Order: †Medullosales; Corsin, 1960

Families
- Alethopteridaceae; Codonospermaceae; Cyclopteridaceae; Neurodontopteridaceae; Parispermaceae (= Potonieaceae); Polylophospermaceae; Stephanospermaceae

Synonyms
- Neuropteridales Schimper, 1869; Trigonocarpales Seward, 1917; Codonospermales Doweld, 2001; Pachytestales Doweld, 2001; Hexapterospermales Doweld, 2001

= Medullosales =

Medullosales Temporal range: Carboniferous - Early Permian

Extinct order of Late Carboniferous seed ferns

The Medullosales is an extinct order of pteridospermous seed plants characterised by large ovules with circular cross-section and a vascularised nucellus, complex pollen-organs, stems and rachides with a dissected stele, and frond-like leaves. Their nearest still-living relatives are the cycads.

Most medullosales were small to medium-sized trees. The largest specimens were probably of genus Alethopteris, whose fronds could be 7 metres long and the trees were perhaps up to 10 metres tall. Especially in Moscovian times, many medullosales were rather smaller, with fronds only about 2 metres long, and apparently growing in dense, mutually supporting stands. During Kasimovian and Gzhelian times there were also non-arboreal forms with smaller fronds (e.g. Odontopteris) that were probably scrambling or possibly climbing plants.

== Ovules ==
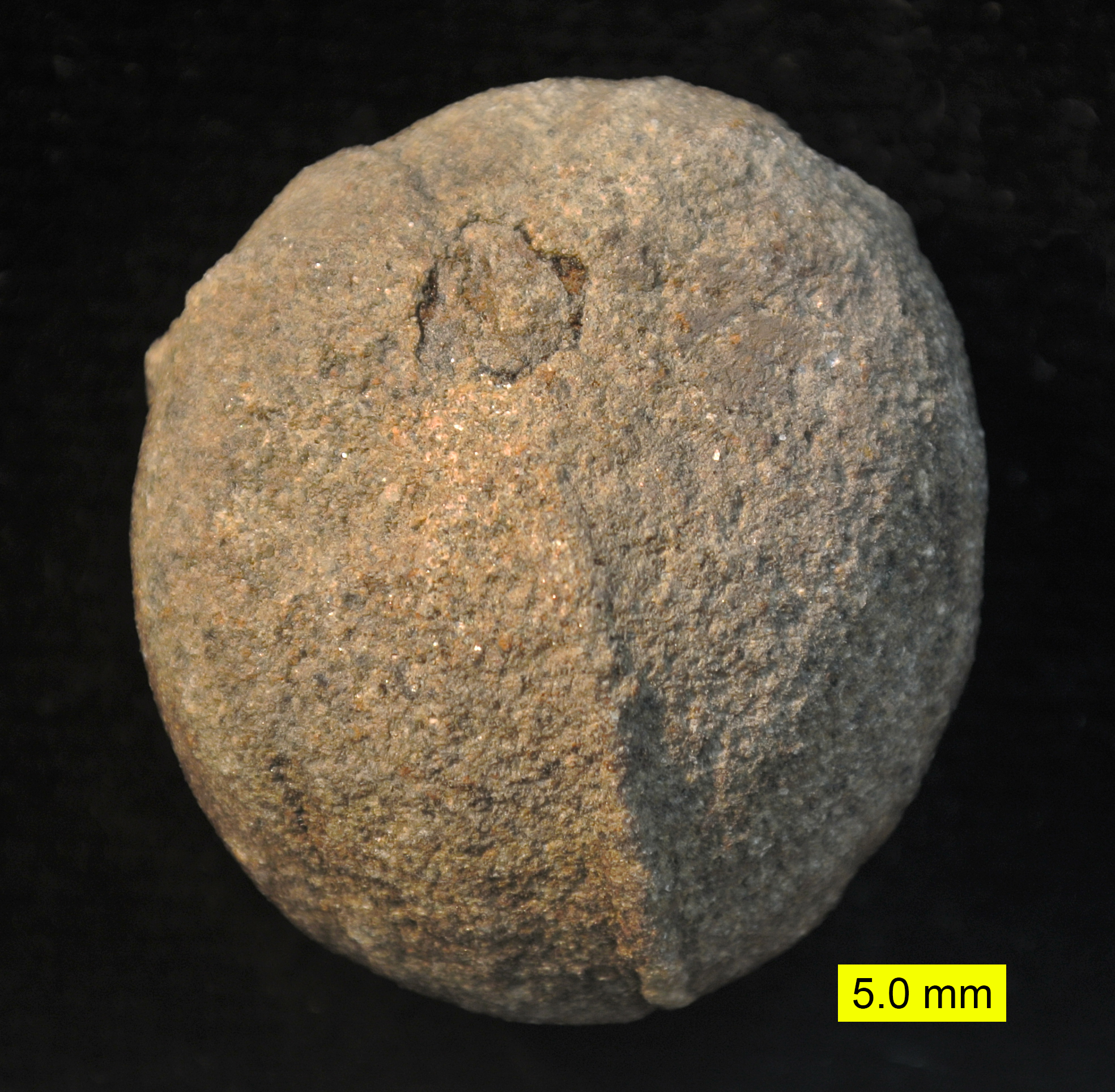
Cast of Trigonocarpus trilocularis ovule showing stalk attachment; Massillon Sandstone (Upper Carboniferous), NE Ohio.

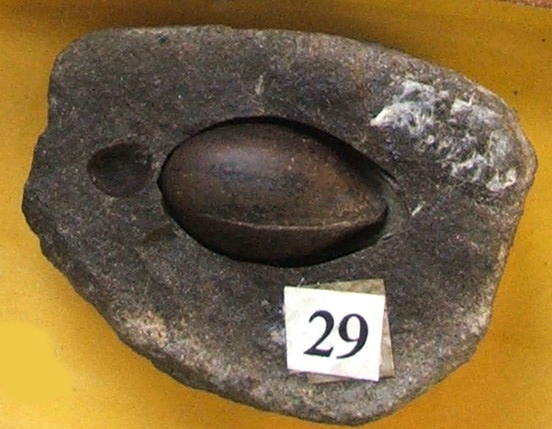
Cast of a Trigonocarpus ovule showing one of the three longitudinal ribs.

Ovules in different medullosalean species could vary from maybe 1 cm to over 10 cm long - the latter being the largest known ovules produced by any non-angiosperm seed-plant. It was traditionally believed that the ovules were borne directly on the fronds, replacing one of the pinnules on the ultimate pinnae. However, there is a strong possibility that this reconstruction was based on the chance finds of ovules having been preserved just lying on a piece of pinna rather than in organic attachment to it. A number of cases are now coming to light that suggest that the seeds were borne in clusters on relatively slender, branching axes, and that these trusses of ovules would have been produced from the top of the trunk among the crown of fronds.

The seed megaspore was surrounded by two layers of tissue: a vascularised nucellus and a usually three-layered integument; the nucellus and integument were completely free except at the base of the ovule. There has been some debate as to the exact homologies of these tissues, and it has been argued that the vascularised nucellus was in fact the nucellus and integument that have become fused together, and that the 'integument' was homologous to a cupule that contained only one ovule.

Most medullosalean ovules preserved as casts or adpressions show three longitudinal ribs and are assigned to the fossil genus Trigonocarpus. When such ovules are preserved as petrifactions, they are assigned to the fossil genera Pachytesta or Stephanospermum, depending mainly on differences in the apical form of the ovule. Another group of medullosalean seeds, usually associated with parispermacean fronds (see later), have six longitudinal ribs and are referred to as Hexagonocarpus when found as adpressions or casts, and Hexapterospermum when found as petrifactions.

== Pollen organs ==
The pollen producing organs consisted of clusters of elongate sacs formed into a variety of cup-, bell- and cigar-shaped configurations, assigned to various fossil genera including Dolerotheca, Whittleseya, Aulacotheca and Potoniea. Unlike with the ovules, there is good anatomical evidence that they were borne on the fronds, attached to the rachis.

The pollen that they produce is strictly known as pre-pollen, as it germinated proximally and was thus intermediate in structure between pteridophytic spores and gymnospermous true-pollen. The pollen organs of the parispermacean species (fossil genus Potoniea) produced spherical pre-pollen with a trilete mark. Most other medullosaleans produced large ovoid pre-pollen with a monolete mark, and assigned to the genus Schopfipollenites.

== Stems ==
Most medullosaleans had unbranched, upright stems that produced a crown of fronds at the top. The most widespread are referred to the fossil genus Medullosa when found as petrifactions with anatomy preserved. When viewed in transverse section they appear to have several vascular segments passing along the length of the stem, superficially resembling the polysteles seen in tree ferns. However, detailed study of these vascular strands has shown that they merge and split along the length of the stem and in fact represents a single dissected stele. As the stems increased in size, the vascular segments also expanded by adding secondary wood. The vascular segments of the stele are embedded in ground tissue that contain canals or ducts thought to have contained a resin-like substance. The cortex surrounding the stele also had resin-ducts, and towards the outside of the stem there were radially aligned bands of sclerotic tissue.

Numerous species used to be recognised for what appeared to be anatomically different Medullosa stems, but many of these differences have been shown to represent changes that took place with the growth of the stem. Moreover, it has been shown that very similar types of stem could bear a variety of different types of frond. There is a distinctive type of stem found in Late Pennsylvanian preserved floras, however, that is referred to as Medullosa endocentrica and has consistently slender stems and (uniquely for medullosaleans) axillary branching, and has been interpreted as a climbing plant. Another distinctive type of stem in which the vascular segments are of two different sizes in transverse section (fossil genus Sutcliffia) has been linked with the parispermacean fronds.

== Foliage ==
Fragments of the fronds are the most frequently found fossils of the Medullosales, and they have been widely used for biostratigraphy and biogeographical studies. Most are characterised by a major fork of the main rachis in the lower (proximal) part of the frond. Each branch produced by the fork has an essentially pinnate appearance, superficially resembling the fronds of many ferns, but it is now thought that they in fact consist of a series of more or less overtopped dichotomies. Only one group of fronds, known as parispermacean fronds (fossil genera Paripteris and Linopteris), lacked this major dichotomy although they were still thought to have been constructed from a series of overtopped dichotomies.

== Families ==
The characters used to differentiate the fossil genera have used in descending order of significance to group families based mainly on vegetative characters, notably the architecture of the frond: (1) the overall architecture of the frond, (2) the epidermis and cuticles, (3) how the pinnules are attached to the rachis, and (4) the veining pattern of the pinnules.

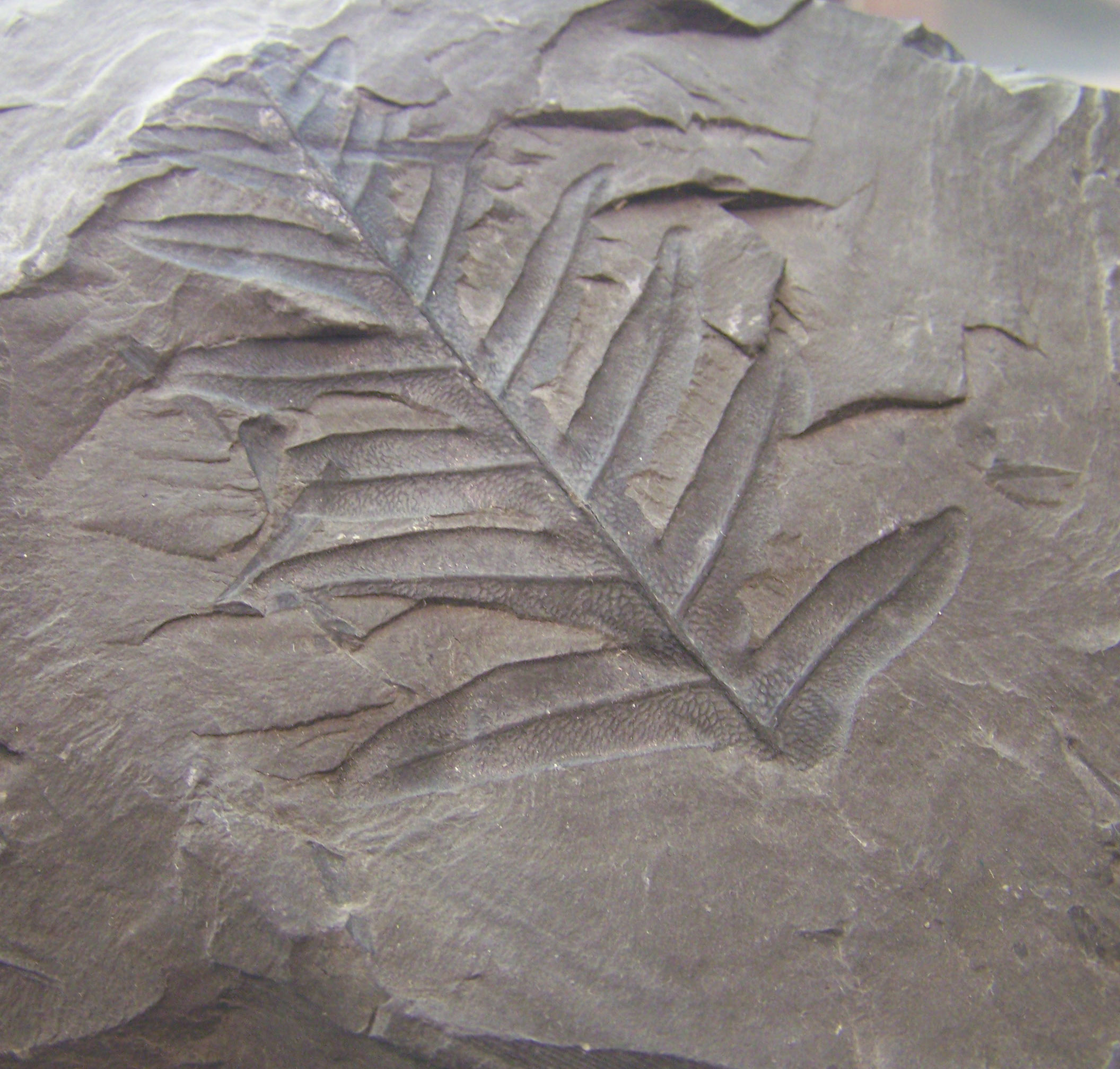
Compression of a Lonchopteris rugosa pinna with mesh veins, probably middle Westphalian age. Collection of the Universiteit Utrecht.

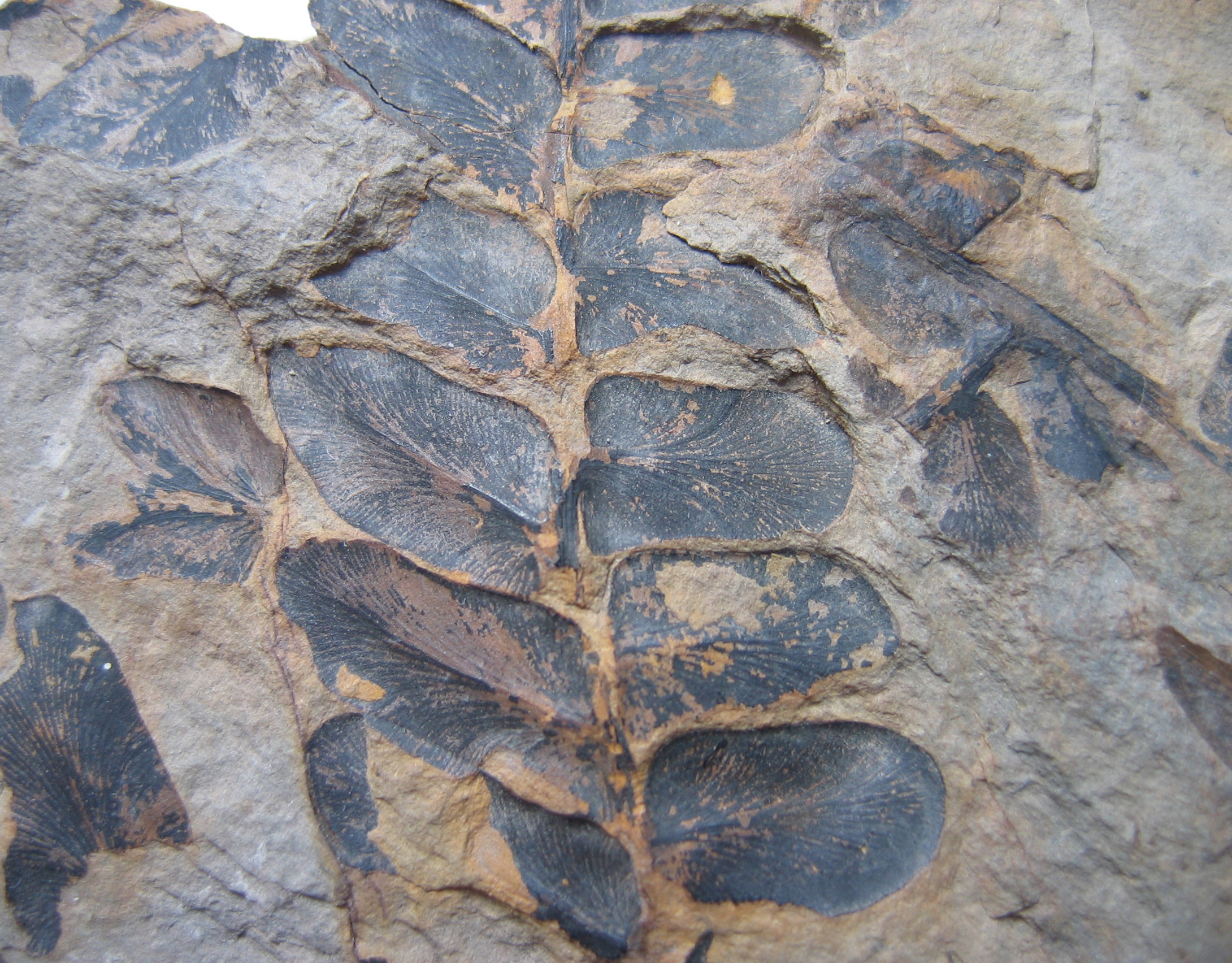
Compression of a Neuropteris ovata, probably Kasimovian age, Spain.

=== Alethopteridaceae ===
- Alethopteris
- Neuralethopteris
- Lonchopteris
- Lonchopteridium
- Cardioneuropteris

=== Cyclopteridaceae ===
- Cyclopteris
- Laveineopteris
- Callipteridium
- Margaritopteris
- Douropteris

=== Neurodontopteridaceae ===
- Neuropteris
- Reticulopteris
- Odontopteris
- Macroneuropteris
- Neurodontopteris
- Neurocallipteris
- Barthelopteris
- Lescuropteris
- Palaeoweichselia

=== Parispermaceae ===
Also commonly known as Potonieaceae, and less commonly Rachivestitaceae or Hexapterospermaceae.

- Hexagonocarpus (= Hexapterospermum) (ovulate organ)
- Linopteris (foliage)
- Paripteris (foliage)
- Potonieae (pollen organ)
- Sutcliffia (stem)

=== incertae sedis ===
"Trigonocarpalean" ovules are generally attributed to medullosans. Examples are listed below. Codonospermum, Colpospermum, Polylophospermum, and Stephanospermum are so anatomically distinctive that some authors classify them each within a monotypic family (Codonospermaceae, Colpospermaceae, Polylophospermaceae, and Stephanospermaceae, respectively).

- Aethotesta (ovulate organ)
- Colpospermum (ovulate organ)
- Codonospermum (ovulate organ)
- Hexaloba (ovulate organ)
- Holcospermum (ovulate organ)
- Pachytesta (ovulate organ)
- Polylophospermum (ovulate organ)
- Polypterospermum (ovulate organ)
- Ptychotesta (ovulate organ)
- Stephanospermum (ovulate organ)
- Trigonocarpus (ovulate organ)

== Distribution ==
The oldest evidence of the Medullosales is of late Mississippian age. The group became particularly diverse and abundant during Moscovian and Kasimovian times when it dominated many habitats in the tropical wetland of Euramerica, especially on clastic substrates. The group became extinct in Euramerica in earliest Permian (Autunian) times. They survived in China for a little longer, with evidence having been found there in the Asselian Stage. There is little evidence to suggest that the Medullosales ranged into the southern latitudes of Gondwana. In the northern hemisphere, there are good late Mississippian records in temperate latitudes of Kazakhstan but evidence from the higher northern latitudes in Siberia (Angara) is more equivocal.
