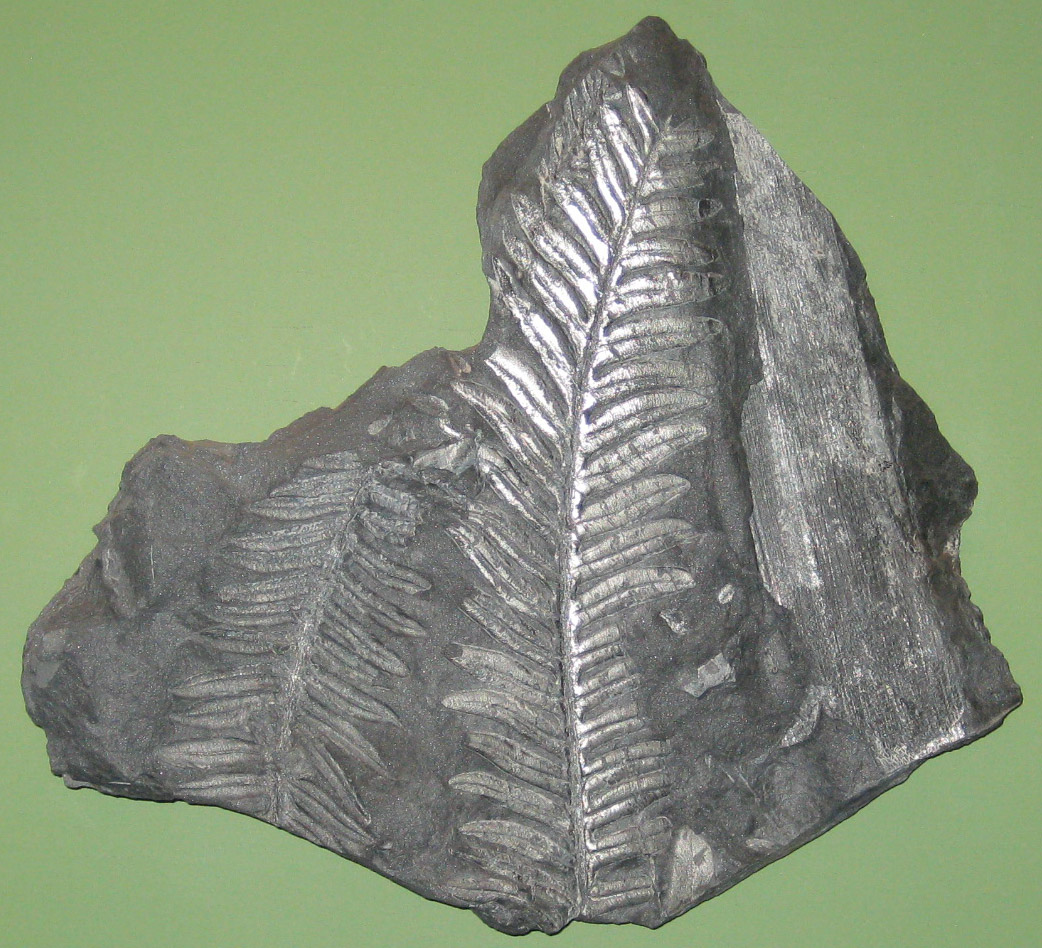
- Alethopteris

Scientific classification
- Kingdom: Plantae
- Clade: Tracheophytes
- Division: †Pteridospermatophyta
- Order: †Medullosales
- Family: †Alethopteridaceae; Corsin 1960

Genera
- Pachytesta permineralized ovules; Trigonocarpus ovule casts; Bernaultia synangium; Alethopteris leaves; Medullosa permineralized stem; Myeloxylon permineralized petiole

= Alethopteridaceae =

Alethopteridaceae Temporal range: Carboniferous–Permian

Extinct family of seed ferns

The Alethopteridaceae are a family of extinct plants belonging to Pteridospermatophyta, or seed ferns.
