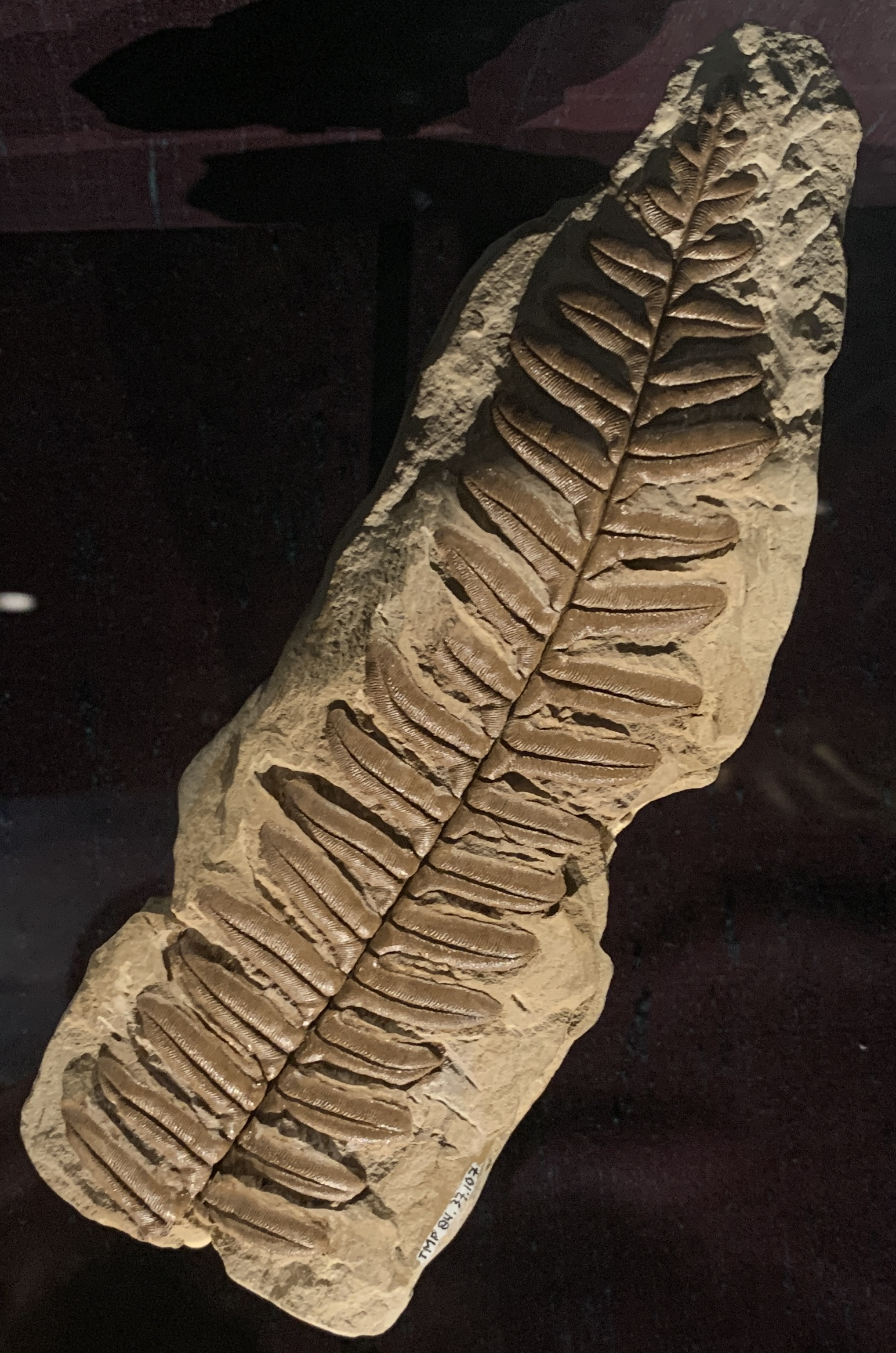
- Alethopteris grandini, late Carboniferous, Kansas. At the Royal Tyrrell Museum of Palaeontology.

Scientific classification
- Kingdom: Plantae
- Clade: Tracheophytes
- Division: †Pteridospermatophyta
- Order: †Medullosales
- Family: †Alethopteridaceae
- Genus: †Alethopteris

Species
- A. branneri; A. lobifolia; A. lonchiticus; A. roesserti; A. serlii; A. sullivantii; A. valida; A. whitbyensis; A. whitneyi

= Alethopteris =

Alethopteris Temporal range: Pennsylvanian, ~323.4–298.9 Ma

Extinct genus of plants

Alethopteris is a prehistoric plant genus of fossil pteridospermatophytes (seed ferns) that developed in the Pennsylvanian (around 320 to 300 million years ago).

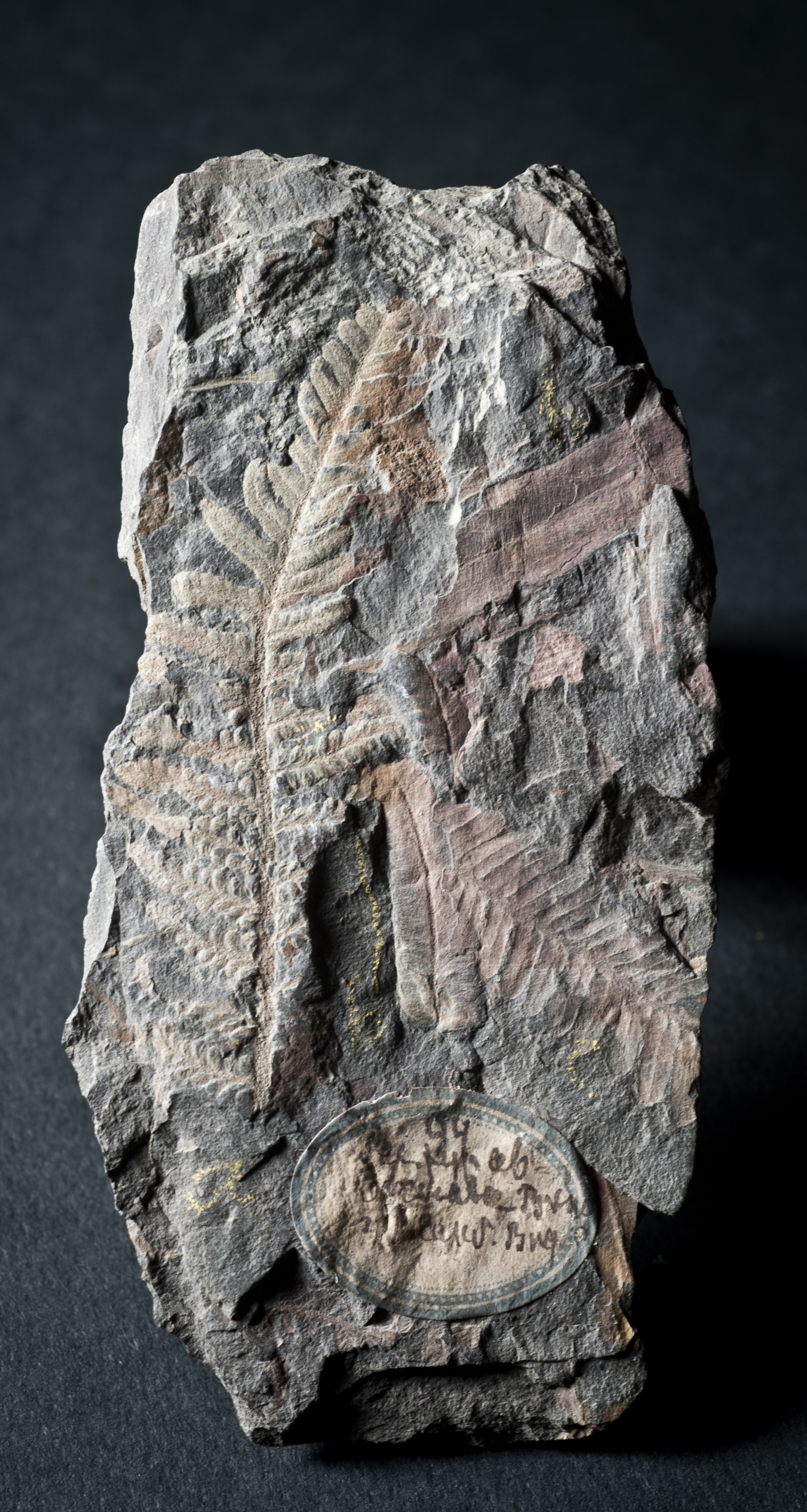
Alethopteris florentina De Stefani, 1901, Natural History Museum University of Pisa

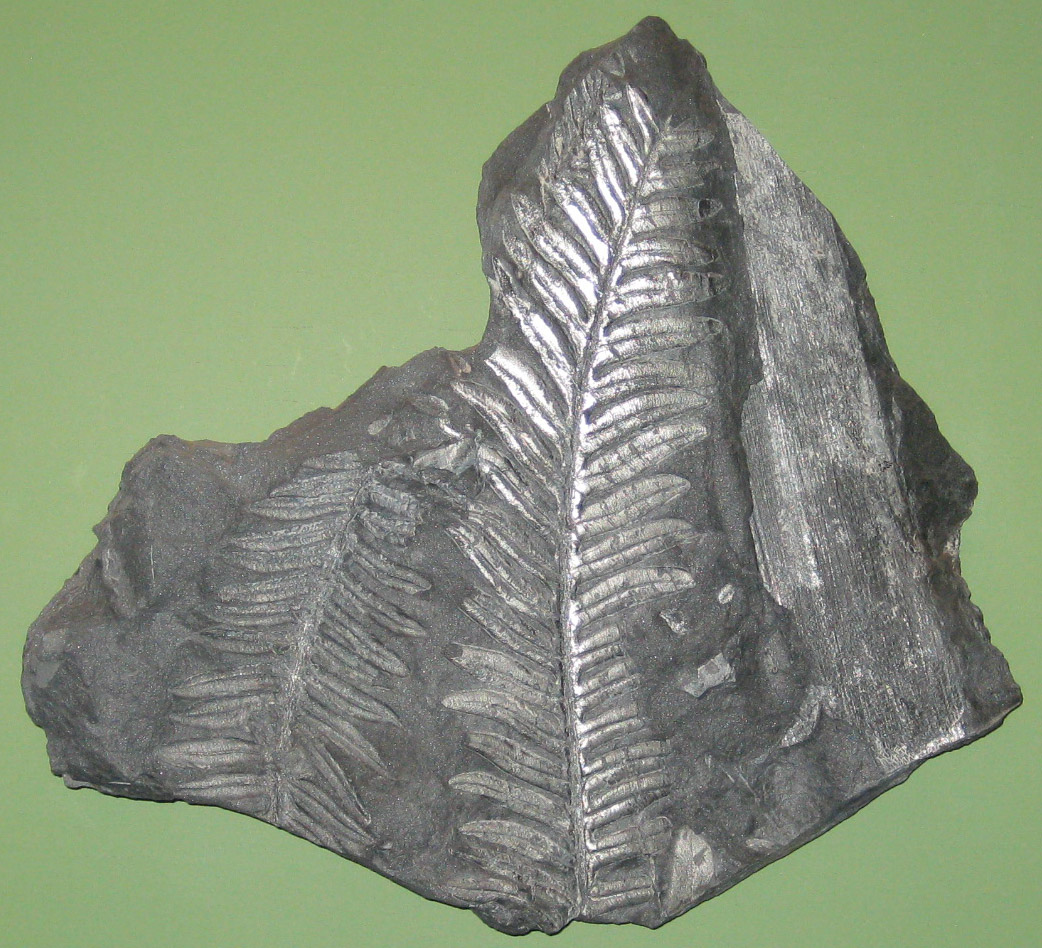
Alethopteris, at the State Museum of Pennsylvania in Harrisburg.

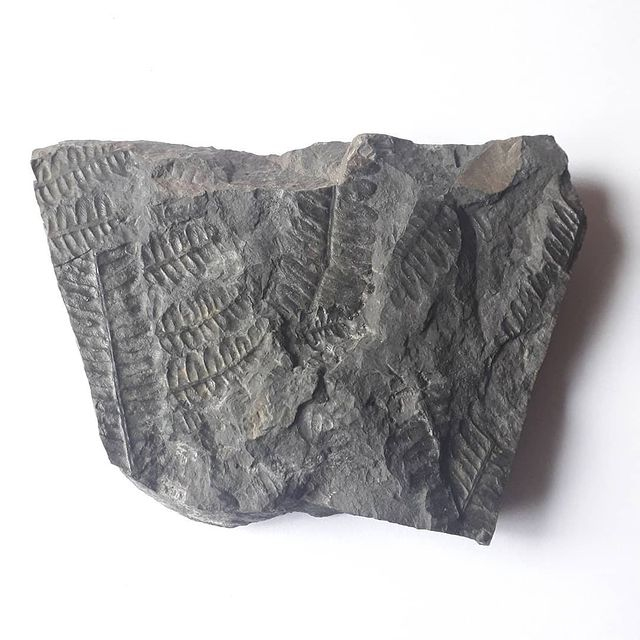
Alethopteris sp.

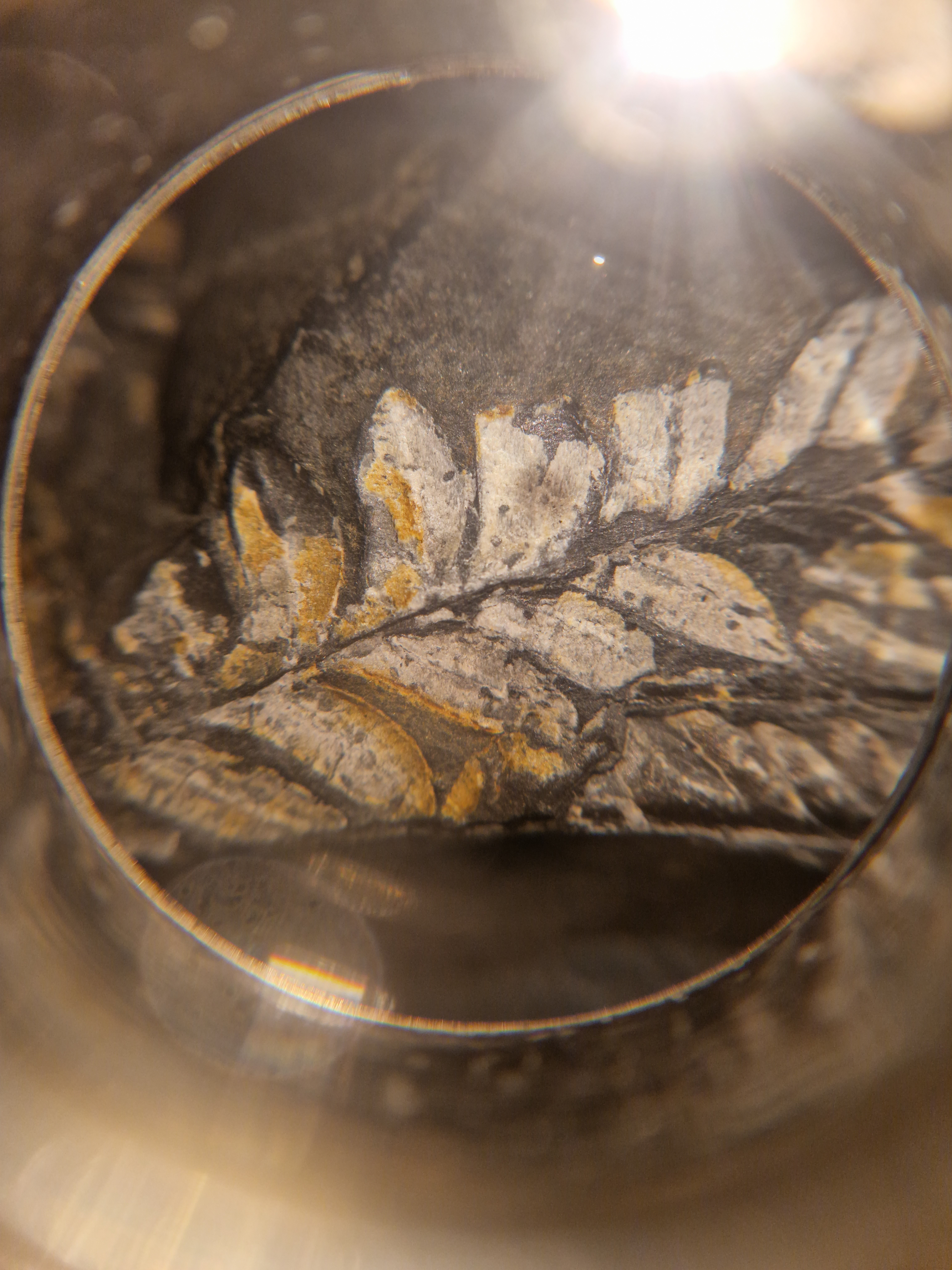
Alethopteris Serlii on laminated mudstone from St. Clair, Pennsylvania.

== See also ==
- Coal forest
