= Coal forest =

Land type during the late Carboniferous and Permian

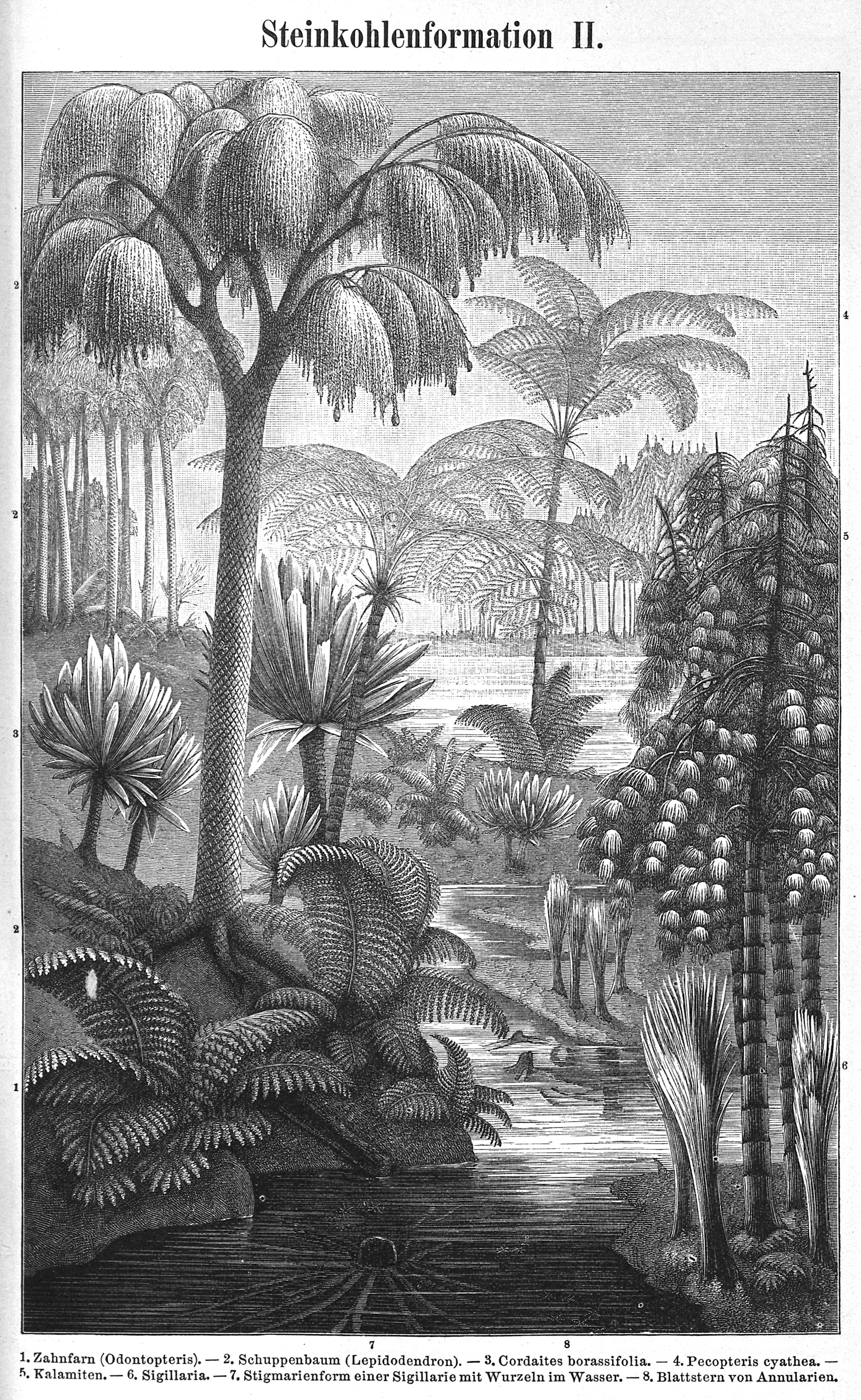
Etching depicting some of the most significant plants of the Carboniferous.

Coal forests or coal swamps were the vast swathes of freshwater swamp and riparian forests that covered much of the lands on Earth's tropical regions during the late Carboniferous (Pennsylvanian) and Permian periods. As plant matter from these wetland forests decayed, enormous deposits of peat accumulated, which later became buried and converted into coal over the subsequent geologic eras.

== Overview ==
Much of the carbon in the peat deposits produced by coal forests came from photosynthetic fixation of atmospheric carbon dioxide, which released the accompanying split-off oxygen into the atmosphere. This process may have greatly increased the atmospheric concentration of oxygen to possibly as high as about 35%, making the air more breathable by animals with inefficient respiratory systems, as indicated by the size of Meganeura compared to modern dragonflies.

Coal forests covered tropical Laurasia (Europe, eastern North America, northwesternmost Africa) and Cathaysia (mainly China). The Carboniferous rainforest collapse was caused by a cooler drier climate that initially fragmented, then collapsed the rainforest ecosystem. During most of the rest of Carboniferous times, the coal forests were mainly restricted to refugia in North America (such as the Appalachian and Illinois coal basins) and central Europe.

At the very end of the Carboniferous, the coal forests underwent a resurgence, expanding mainly in eastern Asia, notably China; they never recovered fully in Laurasia. The Chinese coal forests continued to flourish well into Permian times. This resurgence of the forests in very late Carboniferous caused lowering of global temperatures and a return of extensive polar ice in southern Gondwana as the forests' rapid rate of growth sequestered carbon dioxide from the atmosphere.

== Environment ==
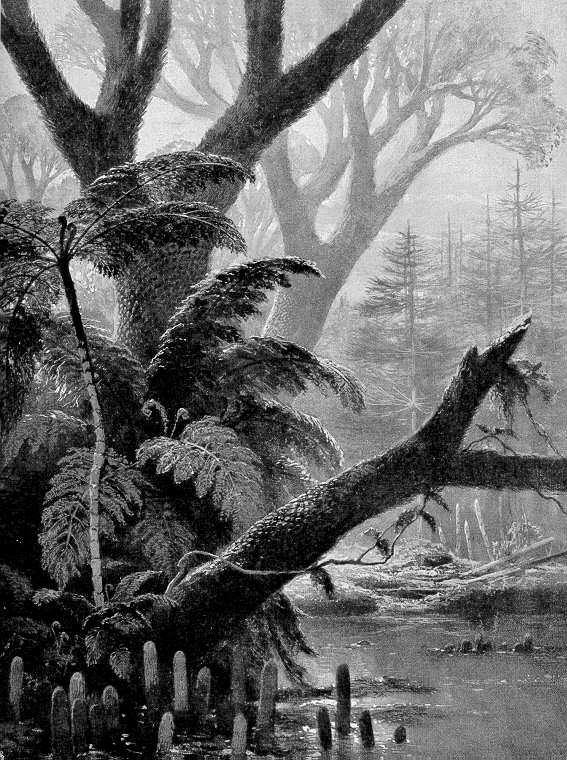
Coal forest of tree ferns and lycopod trees, in a 1906 artist's rendering

The coal forests seem to have been areas of flat, low-lying swampy areas with rivers flowing through from higher, drier land. When the rivers flooded, silt gradually built up into natural levees. Lakes formed as some areas subsided, while formerly wet areas became dry from silt buildups. When a forested area became dry enough to be set on fire by lightning, the resulting forest fire left charcoal, the fusain component of coal.

== Plant life ==
There seems to have been a rich and varied flora, with sets of species for each type of growing condition. The most varied flora seems to have been leafy vegetation, with many species of trees, bushes, creepers, etc. Thickets of Calamites seem to have favored the edges of lakes and waterways. Lycopsid genera specialized in various roles: Paralycopodites as a pioneer on newly silted lakes shallow enough for land vegetation to start; Diaphorodendron later when the ground had become peaty.

Other species specialized in re-settling land which had been briefly deforested by flooding: Synchysidendron and Lepidodendron in mineral-soil areas and Lepidophloios in peat areas. Cordaites may have favored drier areas of the swamp. In the later part of this period tree ferns tended to take over from lycopsid trees.

Some of the characteristic plants of the coal forests were:

- Sigillaria
- Lepidodendron
- Calamites
- pteridosperms

=== British coal forest fossils ===
Genera recorded in Great Britain include:

- Pteridosperm leaves: Alethopteris, Callipteridium, Cyclopteris (leaf bases), ?Desmopteris, Dicksonites, Eusphenopteris, Fortopteris, Hymenophyllites, Karinopteris, Laveinopteris, Linopteris, Lonchopteris, Lyginopteris, Macroneuropteris, Margaritopteris, Mariopteris, Neuralethopteris, Neuropteris, Odontopteris, Palmatopteris, Paropteris, Reticulopteris
- Pteridosperm spore organs: Aulacotheca (male), Boulaya, Potoniea (male), Whittleseya (male)
- Pteridosperm seeds: Gnetopsis, Hexagonocarpus, Holcospermum, Lagenospermum, ?Polypterocarpus, Rhabdocarpus, Trigonocarpus
- Fern fronds: Aphlebia, Bertrandia, Corynepteris, Crossotheca, Cyathocarpus, Lobatopheris, Oligocarpia, Pecopteris, Polymorphopteris, Renaultia, Sphyropteris, Sturia, Zeilleria
- Tree-fern leaves: Caulopteris
- Tree-fern stems: Artisophyton, Megaphyton
- Lycopsid tree stems and leafy shoots: Cyperites, Lepidodendron, Ulodendron
- Lycopsid tree stems: Asolanus, Bothrodendron, Cyclostigma, Lepidophloios, Sigillaria, Sublepidophloios, Syringodendron (de-barked)
- Lycopsid reproductive parts: Flemingites, Lepidodostrobus, Lepidodostrobophyllum (sporophylls), Sigillariostrobus
- Lycopsid (herbaceous) stems: Lycopodites, Selaginellites
- Sphenopsid leaves: Annularia, Asterophyllites
- Sphenopsid stems: Calamites
- Sphenopsid reproductive parts: Bowmanites, Calamostachys, Macrostachya, Palaeostachya
- Cordaite leaves: Cordaites
- Cordaite stem pith case: Artisia (pith cast)
- Cordaite seeds: Cordaicarpus
- Cordaite cones and seeds: Cordaitanthus
- May be progymnosperm: leaves: Noeggerathia
- Conifer leaves: Walchia
- Seeds: Carpolithus, Cornucarpus, Samaropsis

Palaeontologists have described many species for some of these genera, e.g. (in Britain): Sigillaria 33, Lepidodendron 19, Alethopteris (pteridosperm leaves) 11, Calamites 8. Some easily identified species occur over a wide area but only for a small part of the coal-forming period, and are thus useful as zone fossils.

== Animal life ==
Animals inhabiting the coal forests were invertebrates (particularly insects), fish, labyrinthodont amphibians, and early reptiles. Amphibians were widespread, but once the coal forests fragmented, the new environment was better suited to reptiles, which became more diverse and even varied their diet in the rapidly changing environment.
