= Säve-Söderbergh =

Säve-Söderbergh is a surname. Notable people with the surname include:

- Gunnar Säve-Söderbergh (1910–1948), Swedish paleontologist and geologist
- Torgny Säve-Söderbergh (1914–1998), Swedish archaeologist and Egyptologist
