= Hans C. Bjerring =

Swedish scientist

Hans Christian Bjerring (born May 30, 1931) is a Danish-Swedish vertebrate paleontologist and comparative anatomist. He has spent his career at the Swedish Museum of Natural History in Stockholm, Sweden, as curator at the Department of Palaeozoology.

Bjerring's research is mainly about the fundamental structure of the head in vertebrate evolution. His studies are based on detailed analyses of models of the crania of the sarcopterygian fishes Eusthenopteron foordi and Glyptolepis groenlandica from the Devonian as well as serially-sectioned embryos of fishes and urodeles. He belongs to the Stockholm school of paleontology together with, among others, Erik Stensiö, Erik Jarvik, Gunnar Säve-Söderbergh, and Tor Ørvig.

A recurrent theme in Bjerring's research is that much of the vertebrate head is formed by a complex intertwining of serially homologous anatomical segments. According to Bjerring, this holds both for the distribution and composition of cranial nerves, the pharyngeal arches and their contributions to the braincase organs and structures derived from the pharyngeal clefts as well as muscles and cartilages at the base of the skull.

Bjerring has also discussed a number of classical problems in comparative anatomy. Like Erik Jarvik, he has argued that the three ear ossicles of mammals can be derived from components of the hyoid branchial arch of osteolepiforms rather than from both the mandibular and hyoid arches as claimed by the Reichert–Gaupp theory. Another classical problem is which one of two pairs of large dermal bones in the skull roof of sarcopterygian fishes that is homologous to the parietal bone of tetrapods. Here, Bjerring has proposed that neither alternative is correct; rather, the confusion may stem from the fact that, owing to the enormous expansion of the telencephalon in therians, one of the bone pairs has been displaced and forms the tentorium cerebelli below the skull roof. He has also analysed the basic structure of the paired limbs by comparing the pectoral and pelvic fins of the Eusthenopteron with the hindleg of the Devonian tetrapod Ichthyostega and embryonic humans.

Bichirs are a small group of aberrant bony fish whose anatomy has been explored by Bjerring. He identified a pair of intracranial ligaments that hold their brains in place, variations in the structure of the vomer, the structure of the olfactory organ in bichir embryos, and reported a spinobulbar cistern resembling the cerebellomedullary cistern of mammals. Bjerring has disputed the common view that bichirs are actinopterygians, mainly because some alleged homologies between the cranial bones of bichirs and actinopterygians are dubious.

Bjerring has named the temnospondyls Selenocara and Aquiloniferus from the Lower Triassic of East Greenland. His papers are richly illustrated and characterized by a pregnant, sometimes polemic style. He has also written popular scientific articles.

== Honours ==
An Early Triassic temnospondyl amphibian Samarabatrachus bjerringi was named after Bjerring in 2016.
