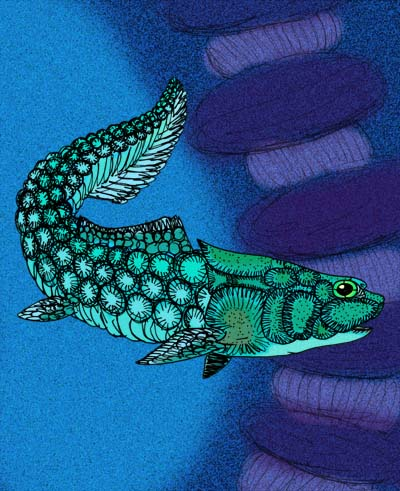
- Artist's reconstruction

Scientific classification
- Kingdom: Animalia
- Phylum: Chordata
- Class: †Placodermi
- Order: †Acanthothoraci
- Family: †Palaeacanthaspidae
- Genus: †Romundina; Ørvig, 1975
- Species: †R. stellina

Binomial name
- †Romundina stellina Ørvig, 1975

= Romundina =

Romundina Temporal range: Early Devonian ~419–400 Ma

Early Devonian genus of placoderm fish

Romundina is a small, heavily armored extinct genus of acanthothoracid placoderms which lived in shallow marine environments in the early Devonian (Lochkovian). The name Romundina honors Canadian geologist and paleontologist Dr. Rómundur (Raymond) Thorsteinsson of Calgary, Alberta, Canada. Romundina are believed to have lived on Earth between 400 and 419 million years ago. The closest known relative to Romundina is the acanthothoracid Radotina. The type and only described species is R. stellina.

The first specimen of Romundina was originally discovered by Swedish paleontologist Tor Ørvig in 1975 on Prince of Wales Island (Nunavut) in a formation that geologically dates back to the Gedinnian. Only one known species of Romundina has been discovered which was named Romundina stellina by Ørvig. The species name stellina refers to stellate (derived from Latin word stella meaning star) tubercles that the Placoderm has ornamenting its dermal skeleton. Romundina stellina is one of the earliest known acanthothoraciforms discovered to date.

Recently, Romundina stellina has been heavily researched as it shows signs of having extremely primitive teeth, which structurally share characteristics of both dermal tubercles and the teeth of modern and fossil gnathostomes. Although Romundina are known to be relatively small especially when compared to some large predatory placoderms of the time, it is still thought to be carnivorous due to the tooth-like structures on its gnathal and supragnathal plates.

Romundina shares many characteristics of both cyclostomes and Gnathostomes to varying degrees. This reinforces the hypothesis that placoderms are a grade as they have some features more closely related to cyclostomes then other placoderms while other features are much more closely related to crown group Gnathostomes.

== Description and paleobiology ==
=== Dentition and the evolution of teeth ===
Romundina is currently understood to be the first placoderm to develop primitive tooth-like structures. Originally, teeth were thought to arise following Placodermi but prior to crown Gnathostomata; however, recent research suggests that teeth may have arisen in derived placoderms such as Romundina. There is currently much debate surrounding whether these tooth-like structures as well as the gnathal plates they sit on can be seen as the true primitive condition of Gnathostome dentition. Some researchers see the tooth-like structures of extensions of a primitive crushing plate, which is common in Placoderms.

These primitive tooth-like structures lie on supragnathal plates and have a multi-cuspid appearance suggesting some degree of tooth-to-tooth occlusion occurred. Additionally, synchrotron radiation X-ray tomographic microscopy reveals that these tooth-like tubercle structures likely consist of a dentine based core and an enameloid cap common to many extant fish groups; however, they lack internal vascularization. The presence of enameloid cap suggests that Romundina is either closely related to crown Gnathostomata or that this feature arose through convergent evolution and was later lost. Romundina's dental tubercles lack any apparent organization which is a more primitive feature found in Cyclostomes suggesting that organized tooth rows evolved just prior to the evolution of the first Gnathostomes.

The supragnathal plates which these tooth-like tubercles sit on are oval-shaped, flat, and relatively symmetrical. This suggests that tubercles were added radially and episodically to the margins of these gnathal plates around a central large pioneer tooth. As tubercles were added the gnathal plates were thickened leading to the presence of growth rest lines. The gnathal plates consist of three layers: the most superficial containing the marginal tooth-like tubercles, the medial layer containing structures containing vascularization, and the basal lamellar layer. Furthermore, Romundina's tubercle structures on the gnathal plates suggest that teeth evolved from an external epithelial structure that moved internal rather than from a non-skeletal antecedent organ system, most likely coming from the stellate tubercles on the dermal skeleton.

=== Skull ===
The skull of Romundina consists of thin proportional dermal bones, which are heavily ornamented by mesodentine rich stellate (star shaped) tubercles. These stellate tubercles likely grew on top of each other with between two and three generations. Furthermore, these tubercles exhibit rough ridges radiation from an apex, which is in contrast to other species, which had smooth ridged stellate tubercles such as Radotina. These stellate tubercles were likely used as a form of protection from predators Additionally, Romundina stellina only has one dermal cheek element (suborbital plate) while most other species of Placoderms such as Radotina have multiple dermal cheek elements. This suggests that Romundina lost the submarginal plates and postsuborbital seen in earlier vertebrates. An additional feature that distinguishes Romundina from previous Placoderms is the absence of tesserae (a type of mineralized tile) between the dermal bones on the roof of the skull as the dermal bones in the roof of Romundina's skull are fused together.

The anatomy of the Romundina nasal capsule combines characteristics of both jawless Cyclostomata and jawed Gnathostomes. Previous to the discovery of Romundina there appeared to be a large jump in the cranial features between the two extant taxa with no apparent bridge. The most prominent of these "bridge" features is the positioning of the nasal capsule dorsally between the eyes, a feature only present in early to mid Placoderms. Cyclostomes lack a nasal capsule instead having a nasohypophysial opening while Gnathostomes have an anterior nasal capsule. Romundina has been shown to unambiguously have a jaw, however the cranial anatomy and proportions of the brain are more closely aligned with those of jawless vertebrates. Analysis of the cranial structure reveals that Romundina had a large precerebral region, broad suborbital shelves, and a small (or potentially non existent) telencephalon. Furthermore, Romundina have a large protruding bony upper "lip", which begins anteriorly to the nasal capsule.

=== Body structure ===
Romundina stellina are relatively small with a body length of about 20 cm (8 in). The cranial portion of Romundina's body was likely heavily armored with the stellate tubercles similarly to what lies on the dermal plates of the skull while the more caudal sections of Romundina's body were likely more flexible allowing for movement. The entirety of Romundina was likely covered in irregularly shaped dermal scales, which is a characteristic unlike the more symmetrical scales that appear on Gnathostomes. Additionally, Romundina likely had a vascular spine which grew posteriorly and proximally from the cranial side of the spine just posterior of the head. This spine likely played a heavily defensive role and grew similarly to how scales grow in Gnathostomes. Furthermore, this defensive spine is made up of semidentine odontodes, dermal bone, and perichondral bone suggesting that it is derived from dermal plates.

=== Diet and behavioral characteristics ===
Romundina were small Placoderms and therefore had to rely on heavily armored skull and anterior sections of their body to fend off larger fish present at the same time. Corals and other shallow water organisms were also found alongside Romundina in the same formation on Prince of Wales Island suggesting that they too lived in relatively shallow water. Their small size is also consistent with a shallow water habitat. Research suggests that Romundina also ate mostly invertebrates such as crustaceans and worms. Romundina's large crushing tooth-like structures as well as the large gnathal plates would appear to be useful in eating organisms with hard shells such as crustaceans. Romundina likely did not migrate or swim long distances as all known specimens have been found in a relatively small range of area in Prince of Wales Island. This lack of geographical range also suggests that Romundina only lived in a highly specialized ecosystem. Overall, relatively little research has been done on the Paleobiology.

== Discovery and classification ==
=== Discovery ===
Romundina was discovered by a Norwegian paleontologist named Tor Ørvig in 1975. The fossil was discovered in rocks collected by geologist Dr. Rómundur Thorsteinsson that were later given to Ørvig to search for fossils. Dr. Thorsteinsson was a pioneer of geology in the Canadian Arctic. While working for the Institute of Sedimentary and Petroleum Geology, Dr. Thorsteinsson came across a formation which dated back to the Gedinnian age and had significant amounts of vertebrate and invertebrate fossils located on the Western part Prince of Wales Island in the Canadian Arctic. The rock sample, which was given to Tor Ørvig to study (and that Romundina was discovered in), was a 0.5 m-thick (1.6 ft) layer which taken from the middle of a 12 m-long (39 ft) section of unnamed carbonate rocks from the locality C-8234. Ørvig prepared the specimen by using a combination of formic and acetic acid to eat away the rocks, leaving a fully preserved three-dimensional Romundina specimen. The specimen initially discovered consisted of a head with mostly complete dermal skull-roof and associated endocranial elements, which lacked most of the body segments. Additional bony plates were discovered in the same rock; however, it was impossible to confirm if they came from the same individual.

Currently, the most commonly cited Romundina specimen is specimen MNHN.F.CPW1, which was originally discovered by Ørvig in 1975 and is preserved three-dimensionally. The specimen was encased in limestone, which was eaten away using a formic acid solution allowing three-dimensional analysis of the specimen. MNHN.F.CPW1, as well as the other known specimens, are kept at the National Museum of Natural History in Paris, France. Other commonly referred to and researched specimens include MNHN.F.CPW6 and MNHN.F.CPW2a-b both of which were found in the same formation on Prince of Wales Island as MNHN.F.CPW1.

=== Depositional environment ===
The Romundina specimens were found near a stream in an unnamed formation of carbonate rocks on the western side Prince of Wales Island in the Canadian Arctic Archipelago. Other species found in this formation include arthrodires, the heterostracans Althaspis, Dinaspidella, and Traquairaspis, gastropods, cephalopods, as well as fossil evidence of both colonial and solitary Corals. This suggests that the geological environment was most likely a shallow water or tidal reef. Throughout the island the fossils recovered range in period from late Silurian to late Silurian. The land that makes up Prince of Wales Island would have been located close to the equator during the Silurian period. Additionally, the average water temperature would have been around 30 °C (86 °F) suggesting that Romundina tended to live in relatively warm waters when compared with the average water temperature today.

Major geological formations namely the Reed Bay and Peel Sound Formations lie on the eastern side of the island and have similar fossilized organisms as the unnamed formations on the island's West side. The region where the first Romundina specimen was found lying beside the westernmost stretches of the Peel Sound Formation in rock, which dates to the Lochkovian age of the Silurian period. The majority of the island including the location where the fossils were discovered consists mainly of limestone and/or dolomite (such as the rocky material where the first Romundina specimen was found in). The western stretches of the Peel Sound Formation are highest in carbon-rich dolomite as the formation is composed of north-trending strata which are graded in the west. This grade is likely due to an uplifting of rocks from lower Paleozoic and pre-Cambrian eras that exists off the eastern side of the island. As the rocks move westward across the island the sedimentary rock is eroded away revealing fossils from the Silurian and Silurian on the eastern side. Additionally, erosion of more sedimentary rock as it moves towards the west leading to a higher percentage of rock being dolomite then when compared to the eastern side of the formation, which explains the discrepancy in the rock composition across the formation.

=== Classification ===
Romundina is commonly characterized as being in the middle of the Placoderm grade. Much of the structural analysis of Romundina reinforces the hypothesis that Placoderms are a grade rather than a clade as they share characteristics of both crown Cyclostomes and crown Gnathostomes. Structural analysis of the possible tooth like structures tends to place Romundina close to crown Gnathostomes while looking at most of the skull and body structures place Romundina centrally among the Placoderm grade. The location of the nasal capsule on the skull is the most widely agreed upon and definitive feature that is shared among all Romundina stellina specimens yet has variations among the Placoderm grade as a whole and hence is used most often to place Romundina among other Placoderms. The following phylogenetic tree classifies Romundina similar to how they were classified in Dupret et al. (2014) published in Nature.

- - Cyclostomata
  - - Osteostraci
    - - Galeaspida
      - - Antiarchi
        - - Brindabellaspis
          - - Romundina
            - - Arthrodira
              - - Entelognathus
                - - Ptyctodontida
                  - Gnathostomata
