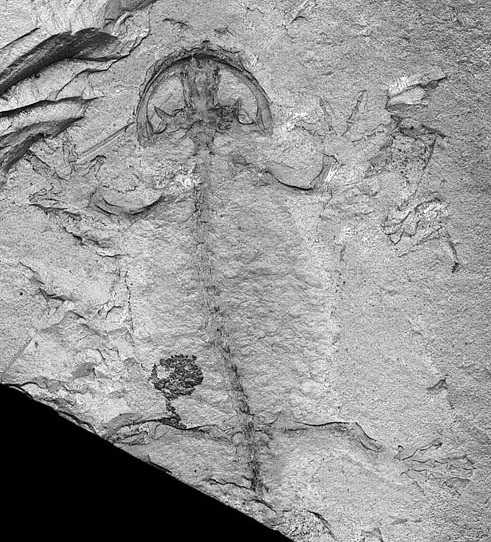
- Pangerpeton, a salamander from the Jurassic

Scientific classification
- Kingdom: Animalia
- Phylum: Chordata
- Clade: Tetrapoda
- Clade: Batrachomorpha; Säve-Söderbergh, 1934

Groups
- Amphibia; Lissamphibia; Incertae sedis; †Caerorhachis

= Batrachomorpha =

Batrachomorpha Temporal range: Early Carboniferous–present

Clade of amphibians

The Batrachomorpha ("frog forms") are a clade containing extant and extinct amphibians that are more closely related to modern amphibians than they are to mammals and reptiles. According to many analyses they include the extinct Temnospondyli; some show that they include the Lepospondyli instead. The name traditionally indicated a more limited group.

The first tetrapods were all amphibians in the physiological sense that they laid their eggs in water, and are colloquially sometimes referred to as labyrinthodonts or stegocephalians. The term "amphibians" can be ambiguous, however. In modern phylogeny, the most basal tetrapods are discerned from two derived branches, one consisting of the crown group of modern amphibians, the Lissamphibia, and its relatives. In this scheme, the name Batrachomorpha is given to this branch of amphibians, while the name Reptiliomorpha denotes the other branch. While the actual phylogeny of the modern amphibians is not well understood, their ancestors are descended from one line of batrachomorphs. All other living tetrapods (reptiles, birds and mammals) are descended from one branch of reptiliomorphs, the amniotes. Amniotes achieved dominance, while all other reptiliomorphs and most batrachomorphs have gone extinct.

== Classification ==
=== Etymology ===
The name Batrachomorpha was coined by the Swedish palaeontologist Gunnar Säve-Söderbergh in 1934 to refer to ichthyostegids, temnospondyls, anthracosaurs, and the frogs. Säve-Söderbergh held the view that salamanders and caecilians are not related to the other tetrapods, but had developed independently from a different group of lobe-finned fish, the porolepiforms. In this view amphibians would be a biphyletic group, and Batrachomorpha was erected to form a natural group consisting of the "true amphibians" (i.e. frogs in Säve-Söderberghs view) and their fossil relatives. The salamanders and the Lepospondyli was consigned to "Urodelomorpha".

Friedrich von Huene adopted it as a superorder of his subclass "Eutetrapoda" (the lower tetrapods exclusive of the urodeles) and included the orders Stegocephalia (here including a number of Labyrinthodonts) and Anura. Erik Jarvik, who took over Säve-Söderberghs work and shared his view of the origin of salamanders, used the term more informally, but in a wider sense, to include the ancestral osteolepiform fishes.

Though never a majority view, the notion that tetrapods had evolved twice, together with the usage of the term batrachomorpha, lingered until genetic analysis started confirming the monophyly of living amphibians in the 1990s. Jarviks classification is no longer followed, all living amphibians and their fossil relatives now being classified together in the group Lissamphibia.

=== Phylogenetics ===
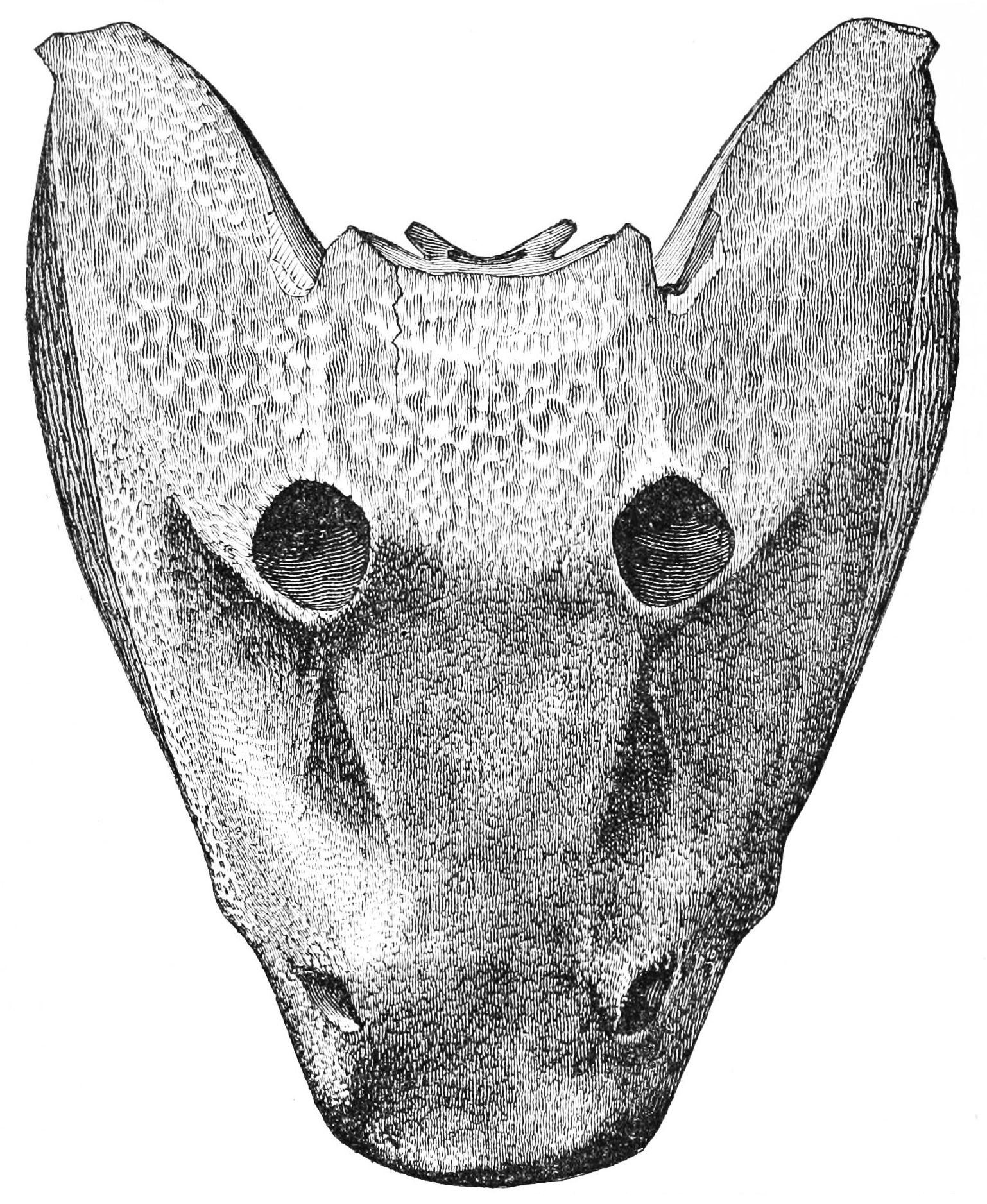
The short, broad skull of Eryops is typical of the batrachomorphans

Michael Benton adopted the term Batrachomorpha to include all living amphibians and extinct relatives more closely related to amphibians than to amniotes. In his scheme, Batrachomorpha is a superorder of amphibious tetrapods containing the following subgroups:

- Superorder Batrachomorpha
  - †Order Edopoidea
  - †Family Dendrerpetonidae
  - Order unnamed
    - †Suborder Dvinosauria
    - †Family Branchiosauridae
    - †Family Dissorophidae
    - Infraclass Lissamphibia
      - †Family Albanerpetonidae
      - Order Gymnophiona (extant )
      - Order Urodela (extant )
      - Order Anura (extant )
  - †Order unnamed
    - †Family †Eryopidae
    - †Family Actinodontidae
    - †Family Archegosauridae
    - †Family Rhinesuchidae
    - †Suborder Capitosauria
    - †Suborder Trematosauria
      - †Family Trematosauridae
      - †Family Metoposauridae
      - †Family Plagiosauridae
      - †Family Rhytidosteidae
      - †Family Brachyopidae
      - †Family Chigutisauridae

The other groups of tetrapods considered more closely related to amniotes are put in the superorder Reptiliomorpha.

The phylogenetic relationships of Paleozoic tetrapods have not yet been worked out with certainty, and the validity of Batrachomorpha as a clade depends on where other amphibians and early amniotes fit on the evolutionary tree. The actual content of Batrachomorpha as cladistically defined is therefore uncertain, and in some phylogenies the clade is redundant (e.g. Laurin 1996).

== Anatomy ==
Batrachomorphs are distinguished by a number of features in the skeleton, including a flat or shallow skull, a fused skull roof with no cranial kinesis, exoccipital-postparietal contact on the occiput, and four or fewer fingers on the hand.

Benton contrasts Batrachomorphs with Reptiliomorphs; both are stem-based clades; the former constitutes the "amphibian" evolutionary radiation, the latter the contemporary proto-reptilian and early amniote evolution.

In the appendix to Vertebrate Palaeontology, which combines cladistic and linnaean rankings, Benton has given Batrachomorpha the rank of Subclass in his 2001 edition, Class in the 2004 edition, and Superorder in the 2014 edition.

== General references ==
- Benton, M.J. (2004) taxonomic hierarchy of the vertebrates
- Marjanović, David, (2002) Re: thoughts on which nodes to name Dinosaur Mailing List
- Jarvik, E. (1968). Aspects of vertebrate phylogeny. In: Current Problems of Lower Vertebrate Phylogeny (ed. T. Ørvig), Nobel Symposium 4, pp. 497–527. Stockholm, Almqvist & Wiksell.
