= Brachiosaurus (disambiguation) =

Brachiosaurus is a genus of sauropod dinosaur.

Brachiosaurus may also refer to:

- 9954 Brachiosaurus, an asteroid

== See also ==
- Branchiosaurus, a Palaeozoic amphibian
