= Phyllospondyli =

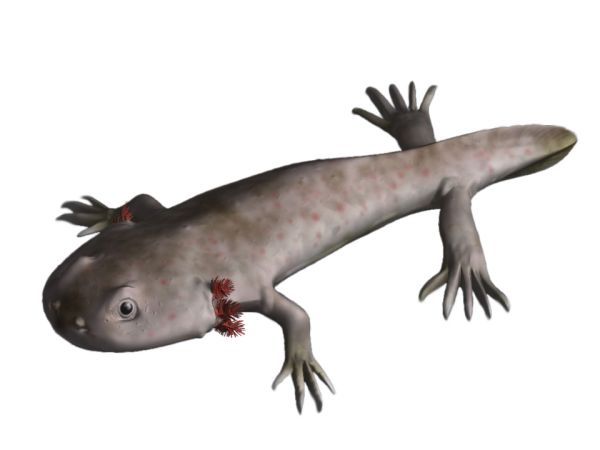
Restoration of a branchiosaur, now known to be a larval temnospondyl

The Phyllospondyli is a now abandoned term for a series of small, poorly ossified fossils of labyrinthodont amphibians from the Paleozoic. The groups was proposed as an order on the basis if their vertebrae, which was either consisting of neural arches over an otherwise unossified notocord or consisting of thin-walled, ring-shaped intercentra topped by the neural arch. The name pyllospondily is from Greek, "leaf vertebrae".

While the group originally was based on the shape of the vertebrae, common in older classification of labyrinthodonts, several families was at times assigned to it based on skull characters. All members were more or less salamander-like in body outline, with weak, poorly ossified limbs, four fingers to the hand and a more or less round skull when seen from above. Remains of larval gills were frequently found. What animals was actually assigned to the group varies, Case (1946) gave four families that he confidently assigned to the order: Branchiosauridae (now known to be larval Temnospondyli), Eugyrinidae (various temnospondyl and anthracosaur groups), Melanerpetontidae and Microbatrachidae (now abandoned). The group as a whole seem to have been a wastebasket taxon for various small, poorly ossified and/or larval fossils, the families once ascribed to it largely being constructed from similar animals found in different parts of the world.
