= Bristol Dinosaur Project =

Science education initiative in the United Kingdom

- Abbreviation: BDP
- Formation: 2000
- Headquarters: Bristol, UK
- Founder: Michael Benton
- Engagement Officer: Rhys Charles
- Parent organization: University of Bristol

The Bristol Dinosaur Project is a public engagement and educational initiative run by the University of Bristol. It began in 2000, and since then the Bristol Dinosaur Project team has visited hundreds of schools and spoken to tens of thousands of children, as well as appearing at science fairs in Bristol and elsewhere.

== Background ==
The Bristol dinosaur, Thecodontosaurus antiquus, was found in 1834, and named in 1836, and did not achieve much recognition locally, either at the time of discovery, in the 1830s, nor later, when it was restudied, in the 1870s, 1900s, or 1990s.

After the re-examination of specimens collected in the 1830s, still located in Bristol City Museum and Art Gallery, and the collection of additional specimens from Tytherington quarry, in the 1970s, local paleontologists and geologists realised the potential to use the newly reinvigorated research programme as a means to include the public, especially local children, in the excitement of scientific discovery.

== Funding ==
Initially, the Bristol Dinosaur Project was funded by the University of Bristol using widening participation funds. These were funds intended to reach out to local schools that did not have a reputation for sending many children to university. By sending students to visit those schools, it was hoped that children will be inspired to later apply to study at university.

The Bristol Dinosaur Project received substantial funding from the Heritage Lottery Fund, and was able to operate at a much more ambitious level, from 2010-2013. After that funding cycle, the University of Bristol continued funding of the project for widening participation purposes.

== Engagement ==
The Bristol Dinosaur Project aims to address children in two age groups: 7 to 9 year-olds and 14 to 15 year-olds. It focuses on teenagers and young adults rather than young children in order to encourage an academic pursuit in this subject.

A recent evaluation report about the Bristol Dinosaur Project by David Owen, summarised the learning and engagement side of the project as follows:

Since May 2010 the project engaged with over 136 schools and more than 13,200 pupils. The majority of these pupils were Key Stage 1-2 (11,000) with the remainder being Key Stage 3-4 (2,000). In total the project delivered 216 day visits to schools, reaching schools across Bristol, North Somerset, South Gloucestershire and Bath and North East Somerset. The project also visited some schools in Somerset, Dorset, Wiltshire, South Wales, Gloucestershire and one in the West Midlands. Interviews confirmed that the project had developed a reputation across the city with teachers, schools and organisations that support schools. This was attributed to the high quality resources and professionalism of the volunteers and staff delivering the workshop. A major part of the schools’ outreach was the development of fossil walks; these were particularly targeted at Key Stage 3-4. Young people had the chance to visit Aust Cliffs, South Gloucestershire or Charmouth, Dorset, to find fossils and discover more about how they formed and what life was like in the past.

In addition to its work with schools, the project team developed a wide range of partnerships with organisations across the city, in order to engage new audiences and hard-to-reach adults and young people with the project. Evidence collected for this report suggested that the partnerships would have lasting impact beyond the HLF funding, and in particular had connected the discovery of the Bristol Dinosaur with the cultural heritage of the city.

In three years the project visited a wide range of annual or one-off public events and festivals including the Bristol Festival of Nature, At-Bristol, the Cheltenham Science Festival, Arnos Vale Cemetery, libraries across South Gloucestershire, and Bristol's City Museum & Art Gallery. The project visited over 30 one-off or annual events in total, with the project team estimating a reach of 18,000 people (children and adults). These figures do not include the 650,000 people who visit the Bristol Zoo each year.

The reach of the Bristol Dinosaur Project was recognised as successful in capturing new audiences. By building partnerships, the project benefitted from the efforts of other organisations to engage hard-to-reach groups of young people and adults. The project also sought to involve these young people and adults in a more sustained and transformational manner.

In 2018, the Bristol Dinosaur Project was featured in the "Jurassic Make Off" series, a sponsored YouTube collaboration between the Let's Play channels Game Grumps and The Yogscast, where Education Officer Rhys Charles was cast as a competition judge alongside Ben Ebbrell of Sorted Food.

== Laboratory work ==
Laboratory work has always been the key component of the Bristol Dinosaur Project. The 1975 find from Tytherington Quarry consisted of some 4 tonnes of fossiliferous rock, and numerous technical staff and student volunteers have laboured over the years to remove the fossilised bones from the rock.

The HLF funding allowed one side of a new paleontology laboratory to be built at the University of Bristol. This was used for the preparation and curatorial work done with over 4 tonnes of rock containing the remains of Thecodontosaurus and associated micro-fauna. For the first 2 years, the creation and development of a new research collection was one of the main activities in the laboratory. A new volunteering programme was developed at the University, and hundreds of volunteers (University students and external volunteers) worked under the preparator's guidance and supervision in order to process several hundred kilograms of rock by means of acid digestion, mostly using acetic acid. This process, even though very slow and painstaking, delivered results for the project's laboratory and research team: several thousand microfossils were recovered, studied and classified. The implementation of a new summer research programme enabled undergraduate and master students to take part in more advanced research projects, aiming for scientific publication, while developing laboratory and scientific skills.

The second year of the project marked the beginning of curatorial and preparation work. Tonnes of rock were prepared using mechanical or chemical techniques. Thousands of dinosaur bones were extracted and fully curated into a new research collection. Both micro and macrofossil collections are now housed at the University's museum, and are available for further research studies.
