= Vertebrate Palaeontology (book) =

Paleontological book by Michael J. Benton

- First edition
- Author: Michael J. Benton
- Illustrator: John Sibbick
- Language: English
- Genre: Vertebrates, Fossil, Biology, Geology
- Publisher: Blackwell Publishing, Chapman & Hall
- Publication date: 1990, 1997, 2005, 2014, 2024
- Publication place: United Kingdom
- Media type: Paperback
- Pages: 688
- ISBN: 978-1394195084
- Dewey Decimal: 566 22
- LC Class: QE841 .B44 2005

Vertebrate Palaeontology is a basic textbook on vertebrate paleontology by Michael J. Benton, published by Blackwell's. It has so far appeared in five editions, published in 1990, 1997, 2005, 2014, and 2024. It is designed for paleontology graduate courses in biology and geology as well as for the interested layman.

The book is widely used, and has received excellent reviews:

- "This book is a ′must′ for a biology or geology student and researcher concerned by palaeontology. It perfectly succeeds in showing how palaeobiological information is obtained". Review of 3rd edition, Zentrallblatt fur Geologie und Palaontologie, 2007.
- "One anticipates that Benton's Vertebrate Palaeontology will become the 'industry standard', and as such it should occupy space on the shelves of all involved in undergraduate teaching". Ivan Sansom, School of Earth Sciences, University of Birmingham. Review of the 2nd edition for the Micropalaeontological Society.
- "... his expertise in a range of problems of vertebrate paleontology is amazing. As a result the contents of his book [are] very well balanced". Jerzy Dzik, Instytut Palaeobiologii PAN, Warsaw. Review of the 3rd edition for the Journal of Sedimentary Research.

The book gives an overall account of every major group of living and fossil vertebrate. At the rear of the book is a phylogenetic classification which combines both the Linnaean hierarchy and the cladistic arrangement, and has been used as a guideline for the Wikipedia pages on living and extinct vertebrate taxa. However, some of Benton's classification differs from that in the Tree of Life Web Project, especially regarding the relationship of early amphibian groups (Batrachomorpha and Reptiliomorpha).

== Bibliography ==
- Benton, M. J. (2005), Vertebrate Palaeontology, 3rd ed. Blackwell Science Ltd
- Benton, M. J. (2014), Vertebrate Palaeontology, 4th ed. Wiley-Blackwell
- Publisher's Website and Book Overview: 3rd edition, edition
- Benton, M. J. (1995) Paleontología y evolución de los Vertebrados. Ed. Perfils. ISBN 978-84-87695-16-2. Spanish translation by Aurora Grandal-d'Anglade upon the first edition.
- Benton, M. J. (2007), Paläontologie der Wirbeltiere, Verlag Dr. Friedrich Pfeil. German translation by Hans-Ulrich Pfretzschner based upon the third edition.
