= Patrick O'Meara =

Professor Patrick O'Meara (born 8 September 1947) was the Master of Van Mildert College and Professor of Russian and Russian History at Durham University. Until 2003, he was associate professor of Russian at Trinity College, Dublin. He has held visiting fellowships at the Kennan Institute, Washington DC and Fitzwilliam College, Cambridge.

In September 2011 he retired to Oxfordshire. In 2013 he was elected an honorary fellow of Trinity College Dublin.

== Selected works ==
- The Decembrist Pavel Pestel: Russia's First Republican, ISBN 0-333-98455-2
- K.F. Ryleev: A Political Biography of the Decembrist Poet, ISBN 0-691-06602-7
- The Russian Nobility in the Age of Alexander I, ISBN HB 978-1-7883-1486-2, PB 978-1-3501-9656-8

Academic offices
Preceded by George Patterson	Principal of Van Mildert College; 2004–2011	Succeeded by David Harper
