= David Harper (palaeontologist) =

British paleontologist

David A.T. Harper is a British palaeontologist, specialising in fossil brachiopods and numerical methods in palaeontology. He is Professor of Palaeontology in Earth Sciences at Durham University. In December 2014 he began his term as President of the Palaeontological Association.

== Career ==
Harper was previously Professor of Palaeontology and Head of Geology in the Natural History Museum of Denmark, University of Copenhagen. He has published over 10 books and monographs, and also over 250 scientific articles. He is co-writer, with Øyvind Hammer, of the software package PAST. In recent years he has been addressing some of the major events in the history of life, for example the Cambrian Explosion, Great Ordovician Biodiversification Event and the end Ordovician mass extinctions. His research programmes have taken him to many parts of the world including Chile, China, Greenland, Russia and Tibet. His research has been recognized by foreign membership of the Royal Danish Academy of Sciences and Letters, an Einstein Professorship in the Chinese Academy of Sciences and a D.Sc. from Queen's University Belfast. Between 2011 and 2013 he was Deputy Head of Colleges (Research and Scholarly Activities) at Durham university and served as Principal of Van Mildert College between 2011 and 2021.

== Selected publications ==
- Paleontological Data Analysis, Hammer and Harper (2008) (ISBN 9781405172943)
- Introduction to Paleobiology and the Fossil Record, Benton and Harper (2012) (ISBN 9781118685402)
- The Making of Ireland: Landscapes in Geology, Williams and Harper (1999) (ISBN 9781898162063)
- Fossils and Strata, Late Ordovician Brachiopods from West-Central Alaska: Systematics, Ecology and Palaeobiogeography, Rasmussen, Blodgett, and Harper (2012) (ISBN 9781118384176)
- William King D. SC.(1809-1886) A Palaeontological Tribute, Harper (1988) (ISBN 9780907775256)
- Basic Palaeontology (with Michael Benton), Prentice Hall (1997)

Academic offices
Preceded by Patrick O'Meara	Principal of Van Mildert College; 2011–2021	Succeeded by Tom Mole
