= Joseph Frederick Whiteaves =

Canadian paleontologist (1835-1909)

- Born: 26 December 1835; Oxford, England
- Died: 8 August 1909 (aged 73); Ottawa, Ontario, Canada
- Awards: Lyell Medal (1907)
- Scientific career
- Fields: Paleontology

Joseph Frederick Whiteaves (26 December 1835 – 8 August 1909), was a British palaeontologist.

Born in Oxford, Whiteaves was educated at private schools, and afterwards worked under John Phillips at Oxford (1858–1861); he was led to study the Oolitic rocks, and added largely to our knowledge of the fossils of the Great Oolite series, Cornbrash and Corallian.

He visited Canada in 1861 and made acquaintance with the geology of Quebec and Montreal, and in 1863 he was appointed curator of the museum and secretary of the Natural History Society of Montreal, posts which he occupied until 1875. He studied the land and freshwater mollusca of Lower Canada, and the marine invertebrata of the coasts; and also carried on researches among the older Silurian (or Ordovician) fossils of the neighbourhood of Montreal.

In 1875, he joined the palaeontological branch of the Geological Survey of Canada at Montreal; in the following year he became a palaeontologist, and in 1877 he was further appointed zoologist and assistant director of the survey.

In 1881 the offices of the survey were removed to Ottawa, Ontario. His publications on Canadian zoology and palaeontology are numerous and important. Dr Whiteaves was one of the original fellows of the Royal Society of Canada, and contributed to its Transactions, as well as to the Canadian Naturalist and other journals. He received the honorary degree of LL.D in 1900 from McGill University, Montreal. He was a Fellow of the Geological Society of London and the Royal Society of Canada.
