= Basic Palaeontology =

Book by Michael Benton

- Cover of Basic Palaeontology
- Author: Michael J. Benton, David A.T. Harper
- Language: English
- Genre: Paleontology, Fossil, Biology, Geology
- Publisher: Prentice Hall
- Publication date: 1997
- Publication place: United Kingdom
- Media type: Paperback
- Pages: 360
- ISBN: 0-582-22857-3
- OCLC: 37840407

Basic Palaeontology is a basic textbook on the study of paleontology written by the palaeontologists Michael J. Benton and David A.T. Harper, and published by Prentice Hall in 1997. It was described in a 1998 review by palaeontologist Mark Purnell as being uniquely inclusive in its coverage of the subject, going into detail about the history of the science as well as methodology and other aspects. The book was described as having significant, "broad" coverage, but not as much "depth", making it a potential resource for students and researchers looking to find more-detailed references.
