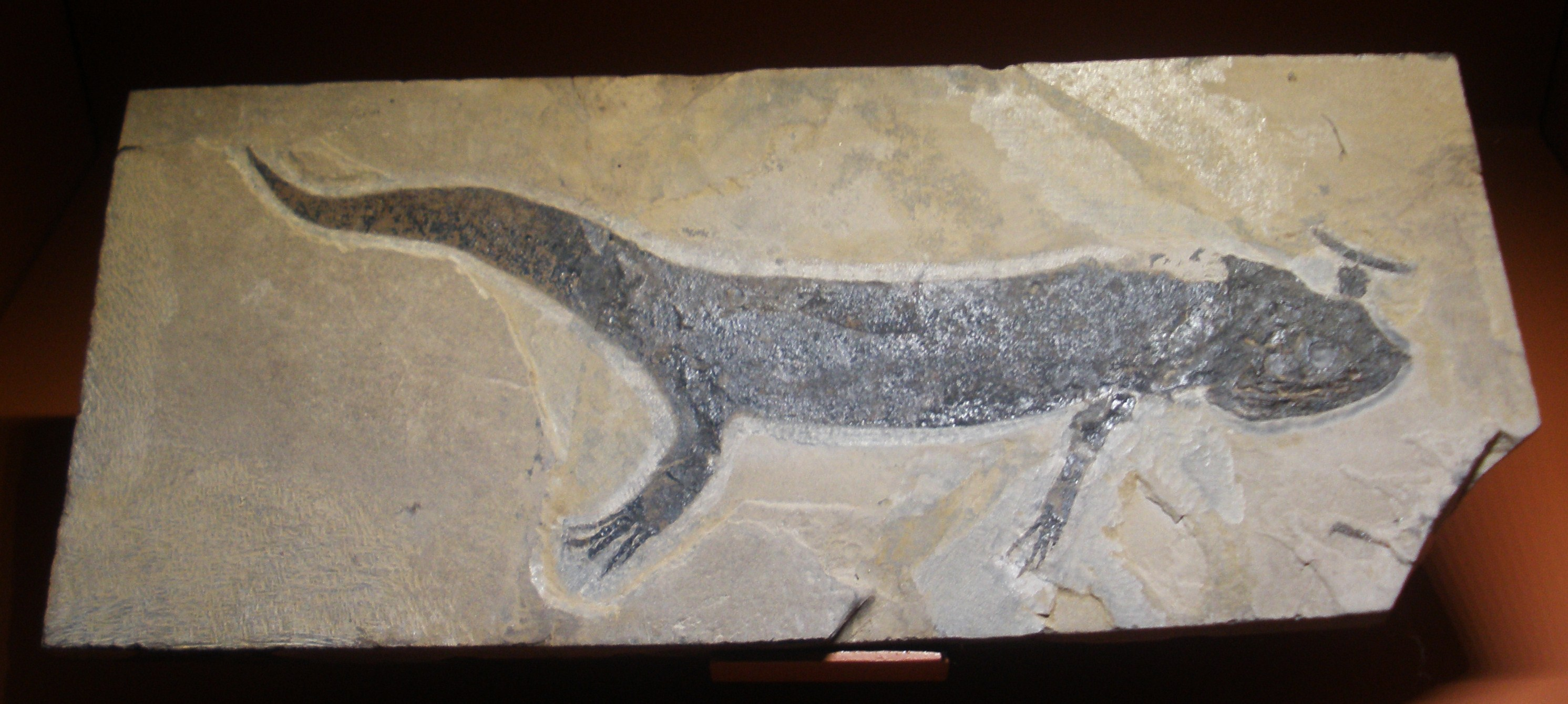
- Fossil of B. salamandroides in the Museo di Storia Naturale di Venezia

Scientific classification
- Kingdom: Animalia
- Phylum: Chordata
- Clade: Tetrapoda
- Order: †Temnospondyli
- Family: †Branchiosauridae
- Subfamily: †Branchiosaurinae
- Genus: †Branchiosaurus; Fritsch, 1876

Species
- B. salamandroides Fritsch, 1875; B. umbrosus Fritsch, 1879

= Branchiosaurus =

Branchiosaurus Temporal range: Lower Permian

Extinct genus of amphibians

Branchiosaurus (from Greek: βράγχιον bránkhion, 'gill' and Greek: σαῦρος saûros, 'lizard') is a genus of small, prehistoric amphibians. Fossils have been discovered in strata dating from the late Pennsylvanian Epoch to the Permian Period. The taxa may be invalid; the material referred to the genus may be juvenile specimens of larger amphibians.

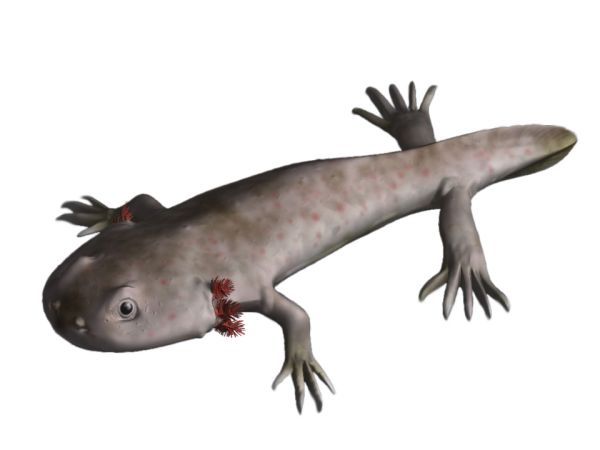
Restoration

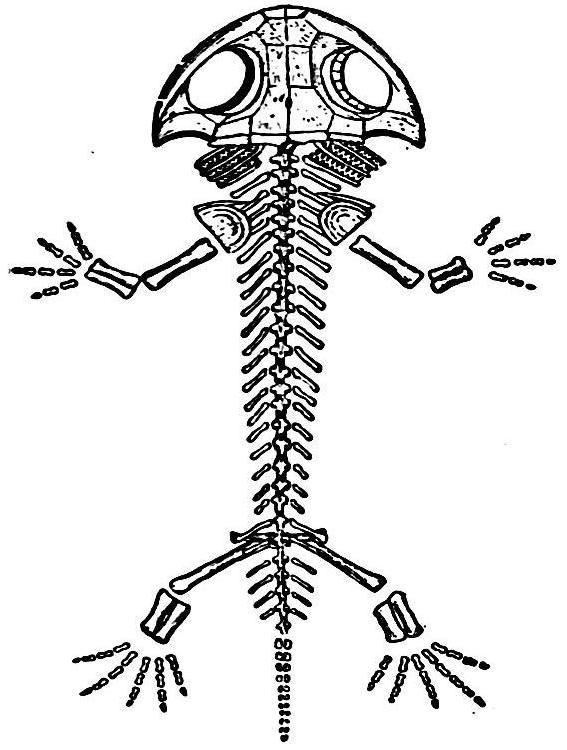
Skeletal diagram

This tiny amphibian was very similar to the Rachitomi, differing primarily in size. Other distinguishing characteristics include a cartilaginous, less ossified skeleton and a shorter skull. Clear traces of gills are present in many fossilized samples, hence the name.

Originally thought to have vertebrae distinct from rhachitomous vertebrae, it was placed in a separate order named Phyllospondyli ("leaf vertebrae"). Later analysis of growth stages showed increasing ossification in larger specimens, which showed that at least some of the species was the larval stage of much larger rachitomes like Eryops, while others represent paedomorphic species which retained the larval gills in adulthood.

Distribution is uncertain, though available fossils come from central Europe, most famous of which are the Permian Niederkirchen Beds around Pfalz, Germany.
