= Torgny Säve-Söderbergh =

Swedish Egyptologist

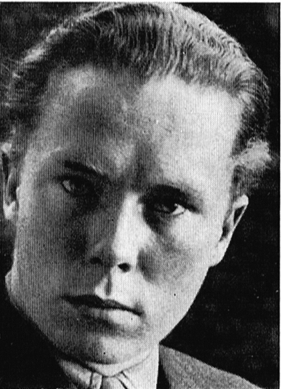
- Born: June 29, 1914; Lund
- Died: May 21, 1998 (aged 83); Uppsala
- Occupation: Egyptologist
- Parent(s): Gotthard Söderbergh (father); Anna Säve (mother)
- Relatives: Gunnar Säve-Söderbergh (brother)

Academic background
- Education: Uppsala University
- Thesis: Ägypten und Nubien: ein Beitrag zur Geschichte altägyptischer Aussenpolitik (1941)

Academic work
- Discipline: Archaeology
- Sub-discipline: Egyptology
- Institutions: Uppsala University

Torgny Säve-Söderbergh (born 29 June 1914 in Lund; died 21 May 1998 in Uppsala) was a Swedish writer, translator, and professor of Egyptology at Uppsala University from 1950 to 1980. He was the younger brother of paleontologist Gunnar Säve-Söderbergh.

== Education and career ==
Torgny Säve-Söderbergh was born in Lund on 29 June 1914 to Gotthard Söderbergh and Anna Säve.

Säve-Söderbergh studied at the University of Göttingen. He then attended the Uppsala University for his doctoral studies and was awarded his doctorate at the age of 27 for his thesis Ägypten und Nubien (1941, written in German). After graduating, he performed archaeological and historical research. From 1935 to 1950, he participated in archaeological excavations in Greece and Turkey (1935, 1938–1939) and in Egypt (1937, 1950). From 1942 to 1980, he was a lecturer, then professor of Egyptology (1950) and dean (1960–1965) of the Faculty of Arts at Uppsala University.

He also served as Director of the Museum of Egyptian Antiquities in Uppsala from 1950 to 1980. From 1960 to 1964, he directed excavations during the Scandinavian expedition in Sudanese Nubia. He was also the director of the Nag Hammadi expedition from 1976 to 1977.

In addition to his research, Säve-Söderbergh helped to popularise archaeological research, giving radio talks and writing popular books such as Egyptian Character (1945) and Pharaohs and Men (1958).

When the Aswan Dam was being built in the 1960s, Säve-Söderbergh became the project leader for a joint Scandinavian expedition (1960–1964) in UNESCO's campaign to save temples and historical monuments from flooding, titled the International Campaign to Save the Monuments of Nubia. The entire area was archaeologically investigated, and a large number of temples was saved. The wealth of findings and data from the expedition was published in 14 volumes edited by Säve-Söderbergh. He published his story of the expedition in the popular book Mission in Nubia: How the World Saved a Country's Cultural Monuments (1996).

== Books ==
Popular books in Swedish:

- Egyptisk egenart ("Egyptian Character") (1945)
- Faraoner och människor ("Pharaohs and Men") (1958)
- Uppdrag Nubien: hur varlden raddade ett lands kulturminnen ("Mission in Nubia: How the World Saved a Country's Cultural Monuments") (1996)

== Affiliations ==
Säve-Söderbergh was a member of the following academies and organisations:

- Royal Swedish Academy of Sciences (secretary, president)
- Royal Swedish Academy of Letters, History and Antiquities
- Royal Society of Sciences in Uppsala
- Royal Society of the Humanities at Uppsala
- Royal Society of Arts and Sciences of Uppsala
- International Association of Egyptologists (president)
