= Michael Benton =

British palaeontologist

Michael Benton OBE FRS FRSE
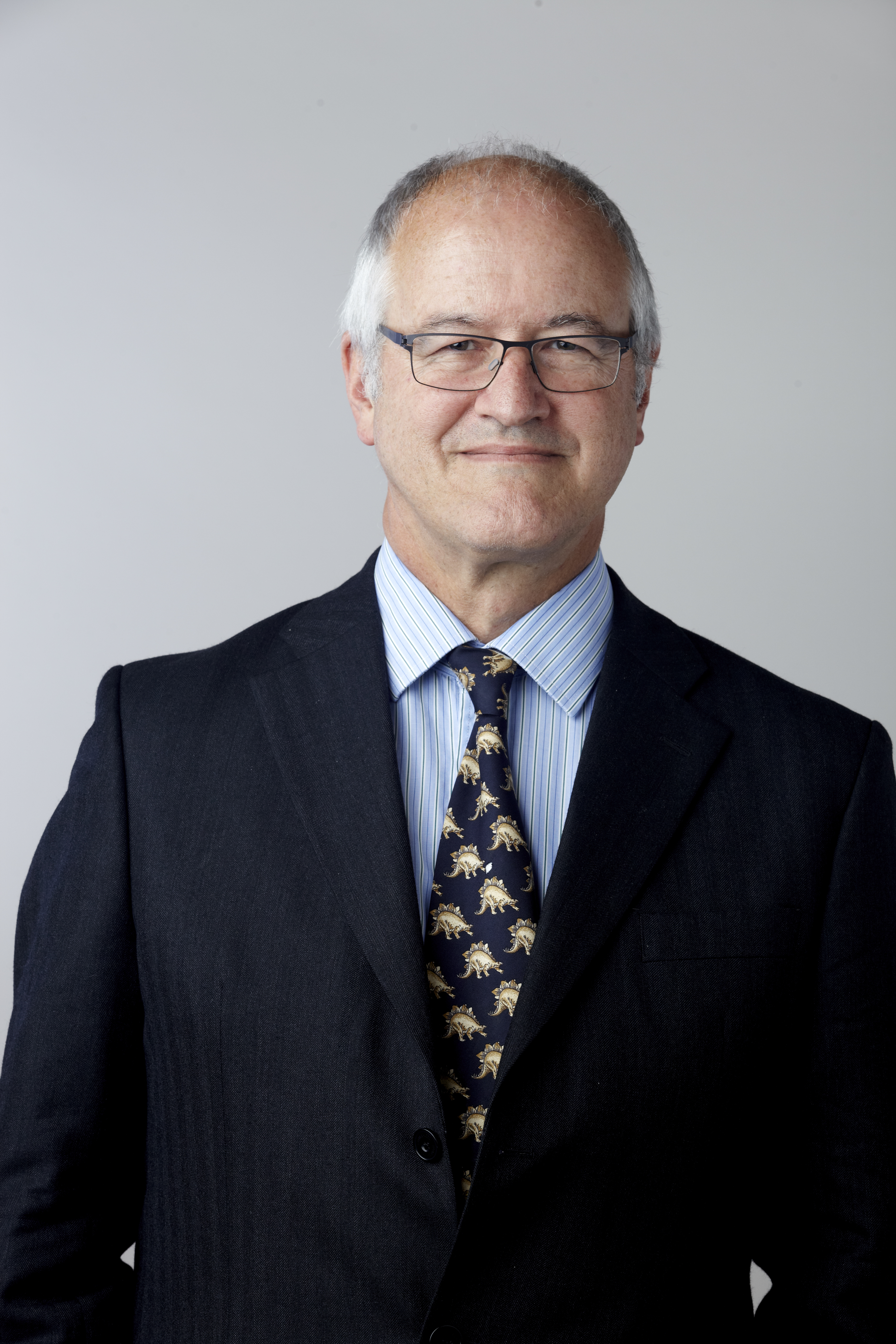
- Benton in 2014
- Born: Michael James Benton; 8 April 1956 (age 70); Scotland
- Education: Robert Gordon's College; University of Aberdeen (BSc); Newcastle University (PhD)
- Known for: Bentonyx
- Awards: Lyell Medal (2005); Lapworth Medal (2024)
- Scientific career
- Fields: Palaeobiology; Palaeontology; Macroevolution
- Workplaces: University of Bristol
- Thesis: The Triassic reptile Hyperodapedon from Elgin, functional morphology and relationships (1981)
- Website: www.bristol.ac.uk/earthsciences/people/mike-j-benton

Michael James Benton (born 8 April 1956) is a British palaeontologist, and professor of vertebrate palaeontology in the School of Earth Sciences at the University of Bristol. His published work has mostly concentrated on the evolution of Triassic reptiles but he has also worked on extinction events and faunal changes in the fossil record.

== Education ==
Benton was educated at Robert Gordon's College, the University of Aberdeen and Newcastle University where he was awarded a PhD in 1981.

== Research and career ==
Benton's research investigates palaeobiology, palaeontology, and macroevolution. His research interests include: diversification of life, quality of the fossil record, shapes of phylogenies, age-clade congruence, mass extinctions, Triassic ecosystem evolution, basal diapsid phylogeny, basal archosaurs, and the origin of the dinosaurs. He has made fundamental contributions to understanding the history of life, particularly concerning how biodiversity changes through time. He has led in integrating data from living and fossil organisms to generate phylogenies – solutions to the question of how major groups originated and diversified through time. This approach has revolutionised the understanding of major questions, including the relative roles of internal and external drivers on the history of life, whether diversity reaches saturation, the significance of mass extinctions, and how major clades radiate. A key theme is the Permian–Triassic extinction event, the largest mass extinction of all time, which took place over 250 million years ago, where he investigates how life was able to recover from such a devastating event.

Benton is the author of several palaeontology text books (e.g. Vertebrate Palaeontology) and children's books on the theme of dinosaurs. His work has been published in a variety of journals. Benton has also advised on many media productions including BBC's Walking with Dinosaurs and was a programme consultant for Paleoworld on Discovery Science. He also contributed to the 2002 BBC programme The Day the Earth Nearly Died, which featured scientists and dealt with the mysteries of the Permian extinction.

In December 2010, Benton had a rhynchosaur (Bentonyx) named in his honour.

Benton founded the Master of Science degree programme in Palaeobiology at Bristol in 1996, from which more than 500 students have graduated. He has supervised more than 80 doctoral students and 25 postdoctoral researchers.

As the Initiator of the Bristol Dinosaur Project Benton was also involved with creating and designing the website for the project.

Below is a list of taxa that Benton has contributed to naming:

Year	Taxon	Authors
2025	Agriodontosaurus helsbypetrae gen. et sp. nov.	Marke, Whiteside, Sethapanichsakul, Coram, Fernandez, Liptak, Newham, & Benton
2023	Chusaurus xiangensis gen. et sp. nov.	Liu, Cheng, Stubbs, Moon, Benton, Yan, & Tian
2022	Guangyuanolimulus shangsiensis gen. et sp. nov.	Hu, Feldmann, Schweitzer, Benton, Huang, Wen, Min, Zhang, Zhou, & Ma
2022	Parvodus huizodus sp. nov.	Wen, Kriwet, Zhang, Benton, Duffin, Huang, Zhou, Hu, & Ma
2021	Microsphenodon bonapartei gen. et sp. nov.	Chambi-Trowell, Martinelli, Whiteside, Vivar, Soares, Schultz, Gill, Benton, & Rayfield
2020	Feralisaurus corami gen. et sp. nov.	Cavicchini, Zaher, & Benton
2019	Aenigmaspina pantyffynnonensis gen. et sp. nov.	Patrick, Whiteside, & Benton
2014	Kulindadromeus zabaikalicus gen. et sp. nov.	Godefroit, Sinitsa, Dhouailly, Bolotsky, Sizov, McNamara, Benton, & Spagna
2014	Nothosaurus zhangi sp. nov.	Lu, Hu, Rieppel, Jiang, Benton, Kelley, Aitchison, Zhou, Wen, Huang, Xie, & Lv
2014	Camarillasaurus cirugedae gen. et sp. nov.	Sánchez-Hernández & Benton
2013	Luopingcoelacanthus eurylacrimalis gen. et sp. nov.	Wen, Zhang, Hu, Benton, Zhou, Tao, Huang, & Chen
2013	Yunnancoelacanthus acrotuberculatus gen. et sp. nov.	Wen, Zhang, Hu, Benton, Zhou, Tao, Huang, & Chen
2012	Luoxiongichthys hyperdorsalis gen. et sp. nov.	Wen, Zhang, Hu, Zhou, Xie, Huang, Chen, & Benton
2011	Goniopholis kiplingi sp. nov.	De Andrade, Edmonds, Benton, & Schouten
2011	Hispaniachelys prebetica gen. et sp. nov.	Slater, Reolid, Schouten, & Benton
2008	Eoconfuciusornis zhengi gen. et sp. nov.	Zhang, Zhou, & Benton
1999	Saturnalia tupiniquim gen. et sp. nov.	Langer, Abdala, Richter, & Benton

=== Publications ===
- Dinosaurs an A-Z Guide (1988, Kingfisher) ISBN 978-0862723859
- The phylogeny and classification of the tetrapods (1998, ed. Volumes 1 and 2)
- Prehistoric Animals (1989, Kingfisher) ISBN 978-0862724580
- Vertebrate Palaeontology (5th edition, 2024, Wiley-Blackwell) ISBN 978-1394195084
- On the trail of the dinosaur (1989, Quarto Publishing) ISBN 0-517-67976-0
- The reign of the reptiles (1991)
- The Rise of the Mammals (1991) ISBN 0-517-02561-2
- The fossil record 2 (1993, ed.)
- Dinosaur and Other Prehistoric Animal Fact Finder (1993)
- Fossil reptiles of Great Britain (1995, with P. S. Spencer)
- The Viking atlas of evolution (1997, with R. Osborne)
- The Penguin historical atlas of the dinosaurs (1997)
- Basic Palaeontology (1997, with D. A. T. Harper) ISBN 0-582-22857-3
- Walking with dinosaurs: the facts (2000) ISBN 0-563-53744-2
- The age of dinosaurs in Russia and Mongolia (2000, ed., with D. M. Unwin, M. A. Shishkin and E. N. Kurochkin)
- Permian and Triassic red beds and the Penarth Group of Great Britain (2002, with E. Cook and P. J. Turner)
- When life nearly died: the greatest mass extinction of all time (1st edition, 2003; 2nd edition, 2008)
- Mesozoic and Tertiary fossil mammals and birds of Great Britain (2005, with L. Cook, D. Schreve, A Currant, and J. J. Hooker) ISBN 9781861074805
- Introduction to Paleobiology and the Fossil Record (2009, with David A.T Harper) ISBN 9781405141574
- The first four billion years Benton, Michael J. (2009). "Paleontology and the History of Life". In Michael Ruse; Joseph Travis (eds.). Evolution: The First Four Billion Years. Cambridge, Massachusetts: The Belknap Press of Harvard University Press. pp. 80–104. ISBN 978-0-674-03175-3.
- The Dinosaurs Rediscovered: How a Scientific Revolution is Rewriting History, (2019) ISBN 978-0500052006
- Dinosaurs: New Visions of a Lost World (2021) ISBN 9780500052198
- Extinctions: How Life Survives, Adapts and Evolves (2023) ISBN 9780500025468
- Dinosaur Behavior: An Illustrated Guide (2023) ISBN 9780691244297

=== Honours and awards ===
Benton was elected a Fellow of the Royal Society (FRS) in 2014 for "substantial contributions to the improvement of natural knowledge" and a Fellow of the Royal Society of Edinburgh (FRSE).

He was appointed Officer of the Order of the British Empire (OBE) in the 2021 Birthday Honours for services to palaeontology and community engagement.

In 2024 he was awarded the Lapworth Medal from the Palaeontological Association.

In 2025, Benton received the Romer-Simpson Medal from the Society of Vertebrate Paleontology. In the same year, he received the Paleontological Society Medal from the Paleontological Society.
