= Jarvikia =

Jarvikia Temporal range: Devonian

Scientific classification
- Domain: Eukaryota
- Kingdom: Animalia
- Phylum: Chordata
- Clade: Sarcopterygii
- Class: Dipnoi
- Genus: †Jarvikia; Lehman, 1959

Extinct genus of fishes

Jarvikia is a genus of prehistoric lungfish which lived during the Devonian period.
