= Radotina =

Radotina Temporal range: Early Devonian

Scientific classification
- Kingdom: Animalia
- Phylum: Chordata
- Class: †Placodermi
- Order: †Acanthothoraci
- Family: †Palaeacanthaspidae
- Genus: †Radotina; Gross, 1950

Species
- R. kosorensis Gross, 1950; R. prima Barrande, 1872; R. tessellata Gross, 1958

Extinct genus of fishes

Radotina is an extinct genus of placoderm from the early Devonian of Europe.
