= Tor Ørvig =

Swedish scientist

Tor Ørvig (27 September 1916 – 27 February 1994) was a Norwegian-born Swedish paleontologist who explored the histology of early vertebrates. He was professor at the Swedish Museum of Natural History in Stockholm and member of the Royal Swedish Academy of Sciences. He described a possible post-Cretaceous coelacanth fossil from the Paleocene epoch.
