= Gunnar Säve-Söderbergh =

Swedish paleontologist

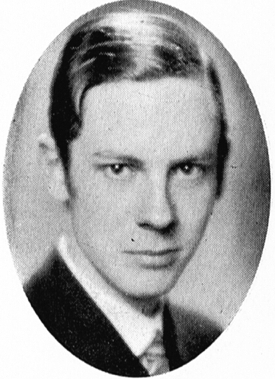
- Born: January 31, 1910
- Died: June 8, 1948 (aged 38)
- Occupations: Palaeontologist and geologist
- Parent(s): Gotthard Söderbergh (father); Anna Säve (mother)
- Relatives: Torgny Säve-Söderbergh (brother)

Academic background
- Education: Uppsala University

Gunnar Säve-Söderbergh (31 January 1910 – 8 June 1948) was a Swedish palaeontologist and geologist. Säve-Söderbergh was born at Falun, the son of the neurologist Gotthard Söderbergh and Inga Säve. He passed his G.C.E. at Gothenburg in 1928 and took bachelor's and licentiate's degrees at Uppsala University in 1931 and 1933, respectively. He was appointed professor of geology, historical geology in particular, at Uppsala in 1937.

== Career ==
Säve-Söderbergh participated in Lauge Koch's Three-year Expedition to East Greenland in 1931-1934 and 1936. He brought back fossils of Ichthyostega, by then the earliest known tetrapod, and published an extensive preliminary report on it in 1932. He also collected fossils on Cyprus (1930), in England and Scotland (1934), and Estonia (1936). Säve-Söderbergh went on to study the biostratigraphy of the East Greenland Palaeozoic and the problem of skull bone homologies among fishes and tetrapods. He also investigated the cranial anatomy of Triassic stegocephalians from East Greenland and Spitsbergen and of Devonian lungfish; he intended to carry out a broad study of both Recent and fossil lungfish.

Other works by Säve-Söderbergh include a comparative study of the lateral line system and an analysis of the trigeminal musculature in lower tetrapods.

== Death and legacy ==
Tuberculosis thwarted Säve-Söderbergh's career and he died in 1948. He died at Solbacken, a sanatorium in Dalarna. His research on the Devonian tetrapod Ichthyostega was continued by Erik Jarvik. Säve-Söderbergh was made an honorary doctor at Uppsala in 1942 and was elected member of the Royal Swedish Academy of Sciences shortly before his death. He was the elder brother of Egyptologist Torgny Säve-Söderbergh (1914–1998) and father of Bengt Säve-Söderbergh (b. 1940), former ambassador and State Secretary.

== Biography ==
[By Erik Jarvik.] Gunnar Säve-Söderbergh. In: Svenska män och kvinnor: biografisk uppslagsbok, vol. 7, p. 413. Stockholm: Bonnier, 1954. [In Swedish.]
