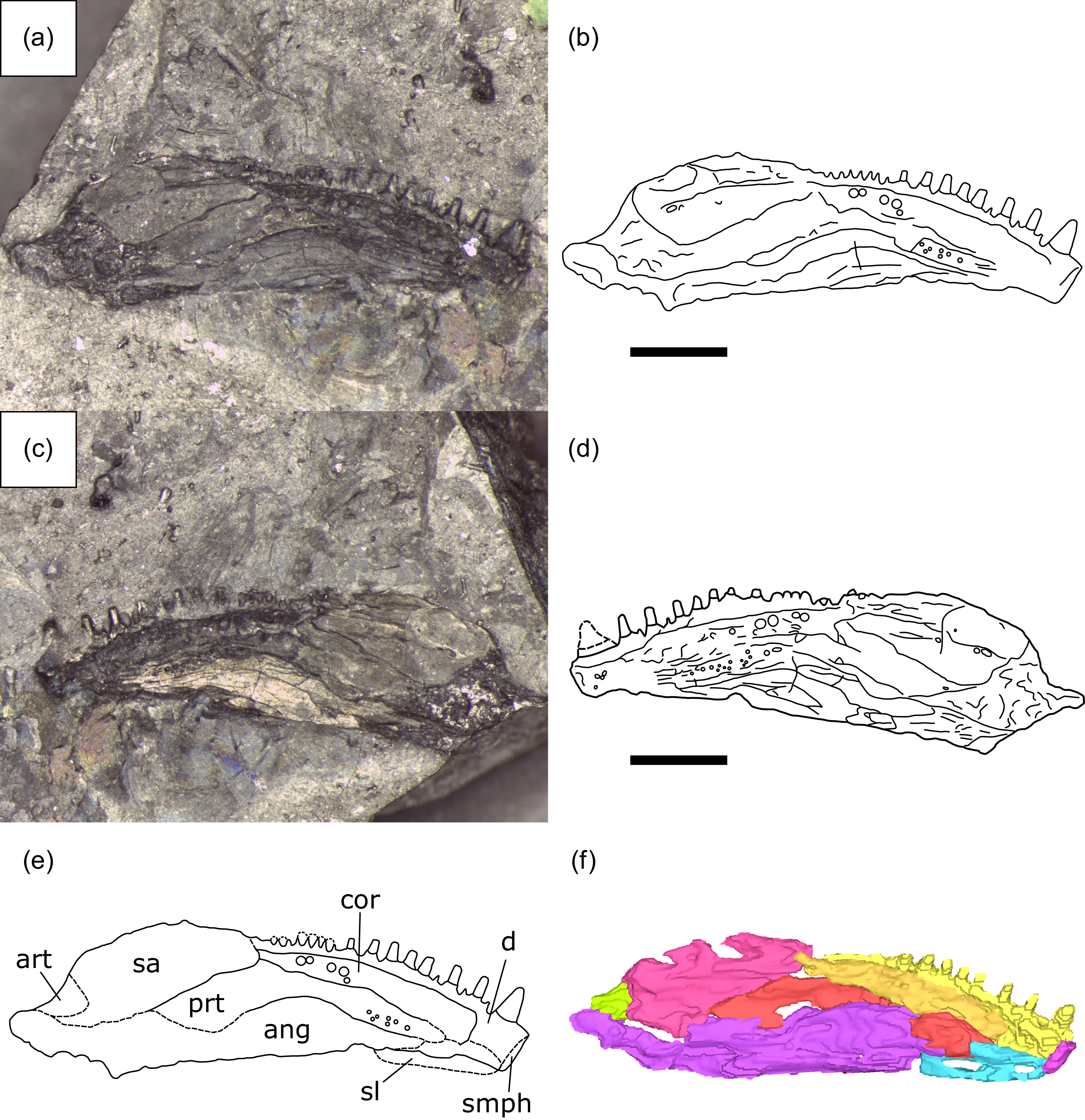
- Holotype specimen

Scientific classification
- Kingdom: Animalia
- Phylum: Chordata
- Clade: Elpistostegalia
- Clade: Stegocephali
- Order: †Nectridea
- Genus: †Albadris; Herring et al., 2026
- Species: †A. smithsoni

Binomial name
- †Albadris smithsoni Herring et al., 2026

= Albadris =

Albadris Temporal range: Late Carboniferous (Pennsylvanian), Langsettian

Extinct genus of amphibious tetrapod

Albadris (lit. 'Scotland thorn') is an extinct genus in the amphibious tetrapod order Nectridea, known from the late Carboniferous (early Pennsylvanian, ~319 to 318 Ma) coal measures of Scotland. The genus contains a single species, Albadris smithsoni, known from an isolated lower jaw. This is the first nectridean fossil identified from Scotland. Albadris is also one of the oldest occurrences of the Nectridea, with fossils of this clade known from similar-aged rocks in Ireland and England, but none known from older localities.

== Discovery and naming ==
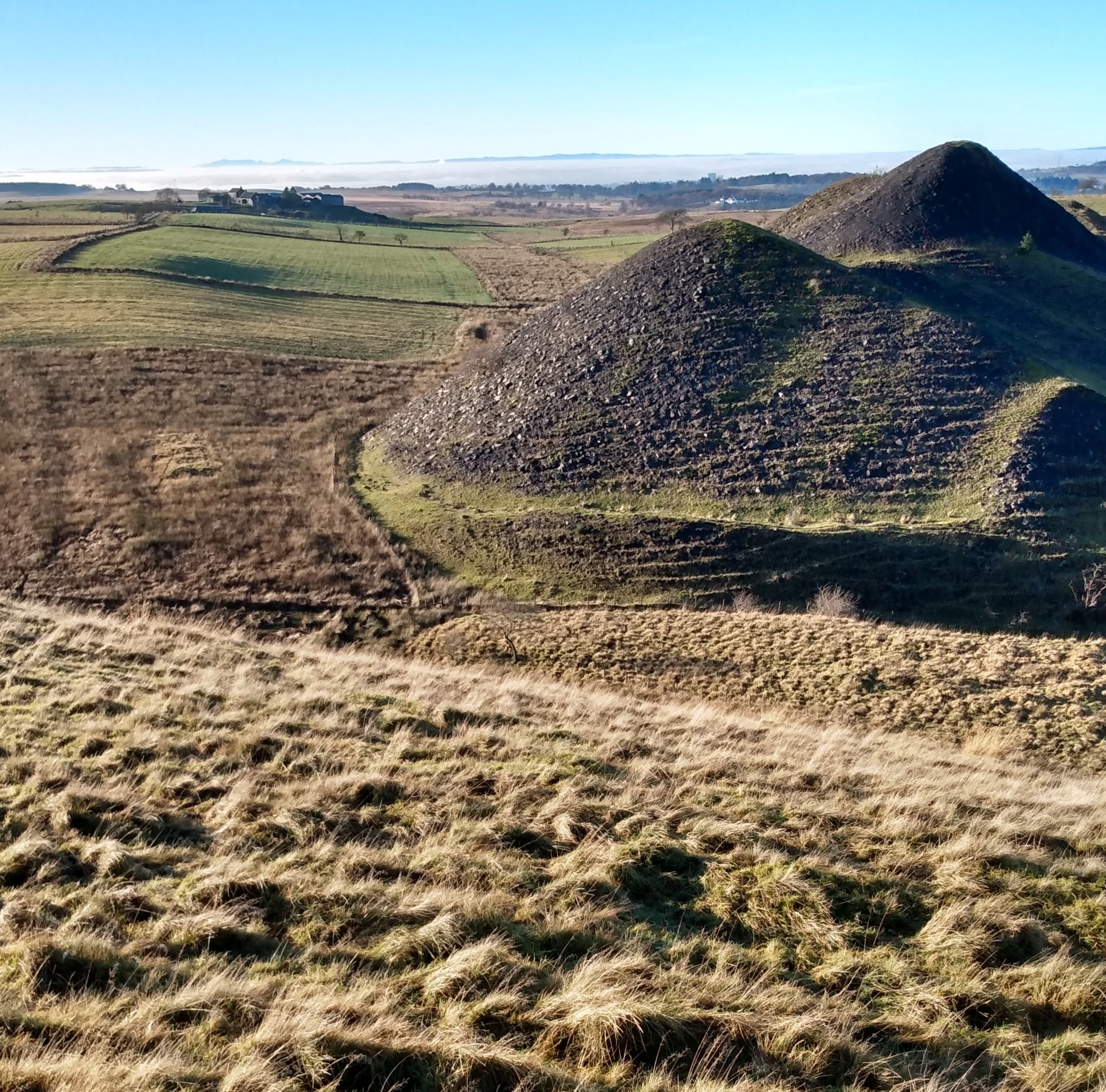
Ardenrigg waste tip near Wester Bracco

The Albadris fossil material was collected from a coal waste tip from the Ardenrigg Colliery near Wester Bracco of North Lanarkshire, Scotland. These deposits are part of the Scottish Lower Coal Measures. The specimen is housed in the National Museums Scotland (NMS), where it is permanently accessioned as specimen NMS G.2025.13.23. It consists of an isolated left hemimandible, preserved on a slab and counterslab. The specimen was CT scanned at the University of Edinburgh School of GeoSciences for more detailed study.

In 2026, Theodore B. Herring and colleagues described Albadris smithsoni as a new genus and species of nectridean tetrapod based on these fossil remains, establishing NMS G.2025.13.23 as the holotype specimen. The generic name, Albadris, combines the Scottish Gaelic words alba, meaning 'Scotland', and dris, meaning 'thorn'. The specific name, smithsoni, honours Timothy R. Smithson and his research on Carboniferous fossils of Scotland.

== Description ==
The lower jaw of Albadris is short and stout, with a broad symphysis, a morphology seen in diplocaulid nectrideans. The dentary bears a large fang at the front of the toothrow, with the remaining teeth being smaller, with a peg-like or conical shape. Eight teeth are preserved, with space for at least six—and up to twelve—more. The coronoid is long, with large teeth along the rear portion. The low placement of the retroarticular process in relation to the toothrow height is characteristic of derived diplocaulids. Unlike diplocaulids, but similar to urocordylid nectrideans, the prearticular bone has teeth, the splenial is fenestrated, and the dentary teeth increase in size toward the front of the mouth.

== Classification ==
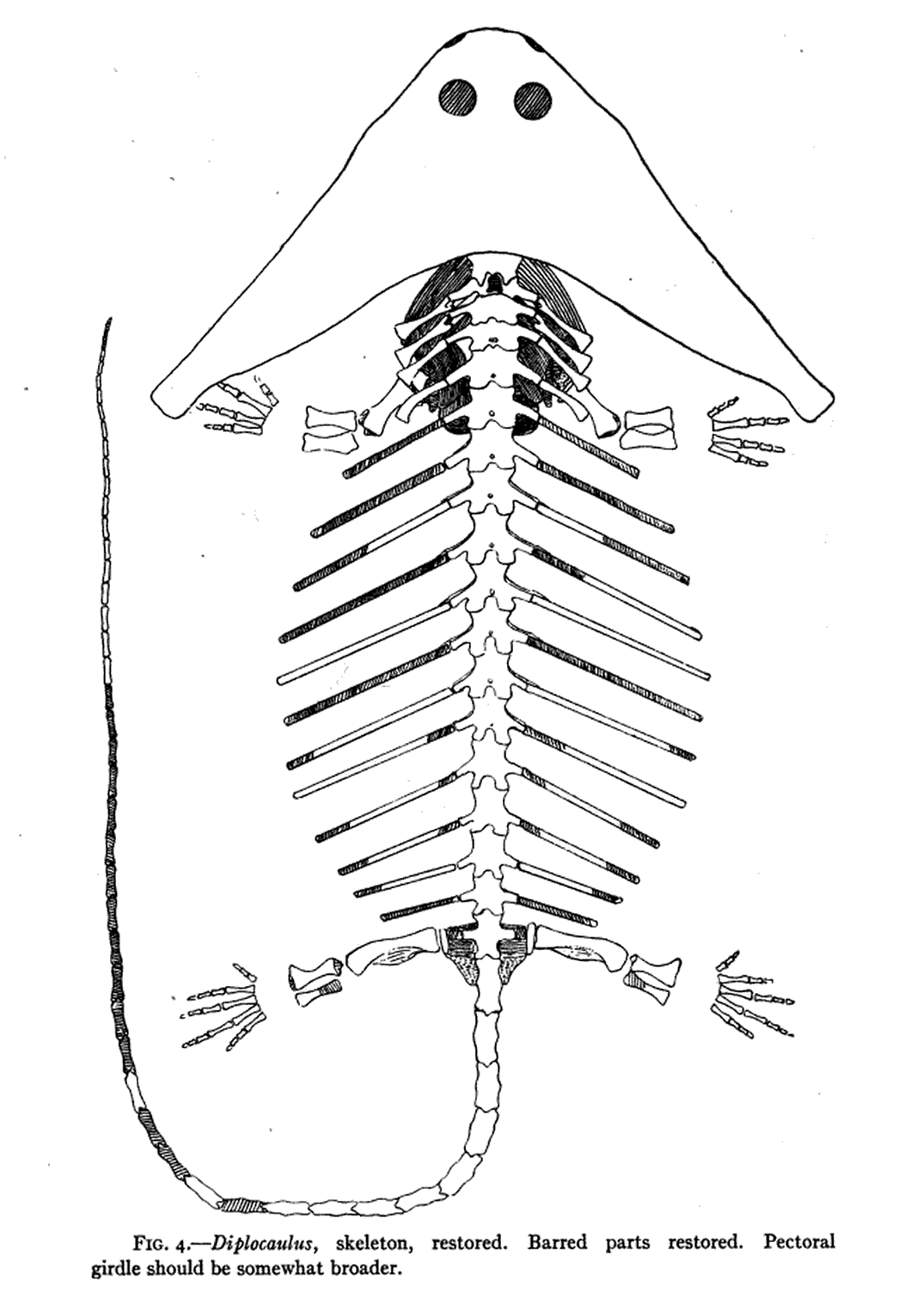
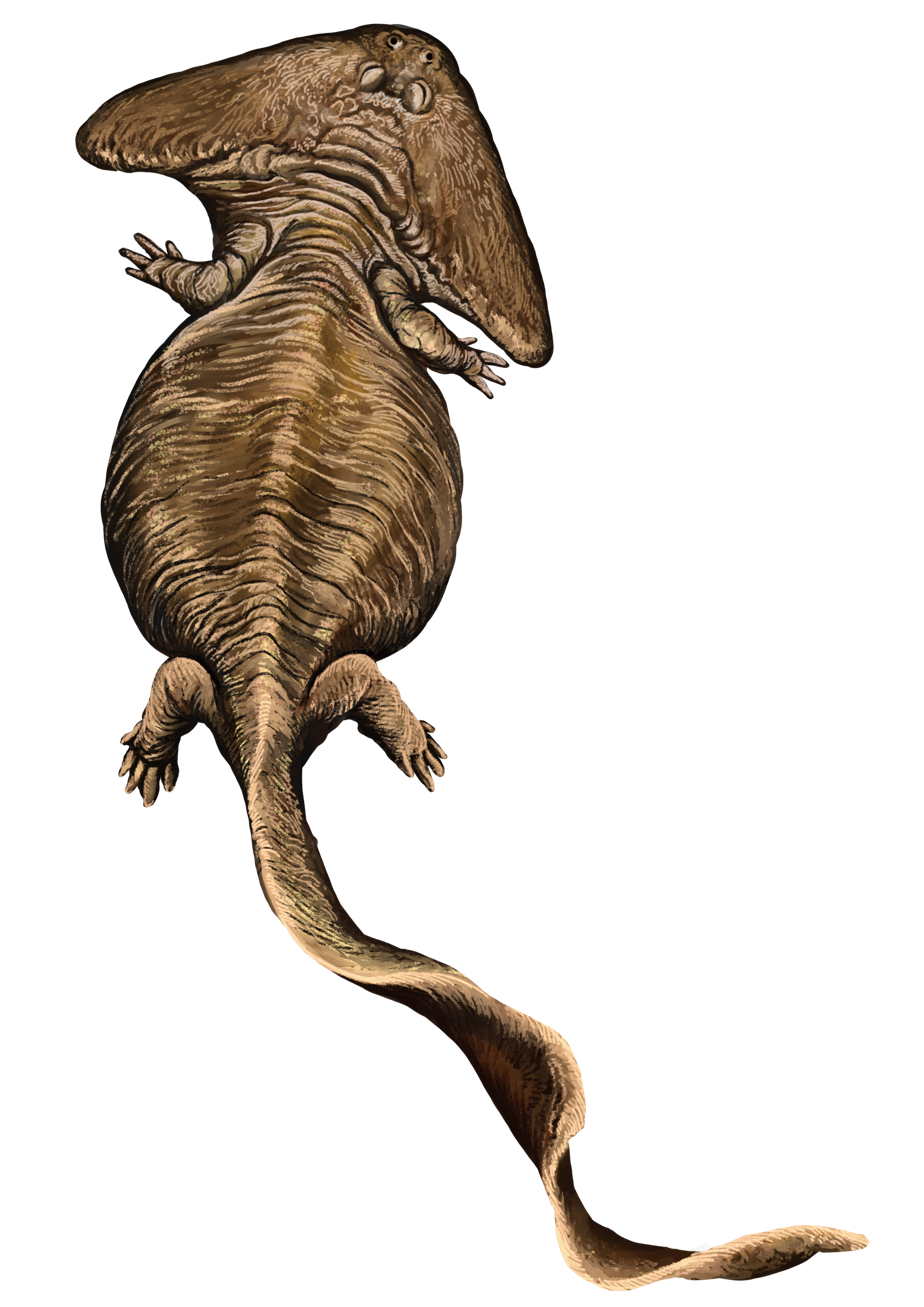
Illustrated skeleton (left) and speculative life restoration (right) of Diplocaulus, a possible close relative

To test the affinities and relationships of Albadris, Herring et al. (2026) included it in the phylogenetic matrix of Milner & Ruta (2009), which includes 11 other nectrideans and 173 anatomical characters. They also tested it in the more restricted matrix of Ahlberg & Clack (1998), which includes fewer species (only two other nectrideans) and only considers anatomical characters of the lower jaw. Both datasets were analyzed using Bayesian Inference and maximum parsimony. Both methods using the dataset of Milner & Ruta (2009) recovered Albadris as a member of the nectridean family Diplocaulidae. The parsimony analysis achieved the highest resolution, with Albadris as the sister taxon to Diploceraspis, albeit with low support. These results are displayed in the cladogram below. Both analyses using the Ahlberg & Clack (1998) matrix were poorly resolved, with the relationships between many taxa reduced to unresolved polytomies. The parsimony analysis placed Albadris as the sister taxon to Sauropleura (a member of the nectridean family Urocordylidae), with Diploceraspis (the only other nectidean tested) as the sister to these genera. Based on these results, and the mosaic of conflicting anatomical features, Herring et al. (2026) refrained from assigning Albadris to either family, pending the potential discovery of more informative fossil material.

- †Lepospondyli
  - Microbrachis
  - - Aistopoda
    - Nectridea
      - Urocordylidae
        - - Crossotelos
          - Sauropleura
        - - Urocordylus
          - - Ctenerpeton
            - Ptyonius
      - - Scincosaurus
        - Diplocaulidae
          - Keraterpeton
          - - Batrachiderpeton
            - - Diceratosaurus
              - - Diplocaulus
                - - Albadris
                  - Diploceraspis

== Palaeoenvironment ==
Albadris is known from the Ardenrigg deposits of the Scottish Lower Coal Measures. Another locality, Calderhead, is also part of this geologic unit. These coal measures have been assigned to the Langsettian (formerly Westphalian A) subdivision of the Westphalian age, dating to around 319 to 318 million years ago. Other tetrapods from these localities include temnospondyls, eogyrinid embolomeres, and baphetids. Fossils of many other semiaquatic or aquatic animals have been found in these rocks, including sarcopterygian and actinopterygian fishes, ostracods, brachiopods, and worms. The depositional environment was likely a small and shallow brackish or freshwater environment.
