= Peronedon =

Peronedon Temporal range: Early Permian

Scientific classification
- Domain: Eukaryota
- Kingdom: Animalia
- Phylum: Chordata
- Clade: Sarcopterygii
- Clade: Tetrapodomorpha
- Order: †Nectridea
- Family: †Diplocaulidae
- Genus: †Peronedon; Olson, 1970

Type species
- †Peronedon primus Olson, 1970

Extinct genus of tetrapodomorphs

Peronedon is an extinct genus of nectrideans in the family Diplocaulidae. It is distinguished from other diplocaulids by the absence of a postorbital.

== Phylogeny ==
Below is a cladogram modified from Germain (2010):

- Nectridea
  - Ptyonius
  - Urocordylidae
    - Sauropleura
    - Urocordylus
  - - Scincosaurus
    - Diplocaulidae
      - Keraterpeton
      - - Diceratosaurus
        - - Batrachiderpeton
          - - Peronedon
            - - Diplocaulus magnicornis
              - - Diploceraspis
                - Diplocaulus minimus
