= Ductilodon =

Ductilodon Temporal range: Early Permian

Scientific classification
- Domain: Eukaryota
- Kingdom: Animalia
- Phylum: Chordata
- Clade: Sarcopterygii
- Clade: Tetrapodomorpha
- Order: †Nectridea
- Family: †Diplocaulidae
- Genus: †Ductilodon; Gubin, 1999

Type species
- †Ductilodon pruitti Gubin, 1999

Extinct genus of tetrapodomorphs

Ductilodon is an extinct genus of nectridean tetrapodomorphs in the family Diplocaulidae. The type and only species Ductilodon pruitti was named in 1999 from the Early Permian of Kansas. Distinguishing features of Ductilodon include horns that project backward from the skull and an arched row of teeth on the palate. Ductilodon is most closely related to the diplocaulids Diplocaulus and Diploceraspis.
