= Arizonerpeton =

Arizonerpeton Temporal range: Middle Pennsylvanian, 314–311 Ma

Scientific classification
- Domain: Eukaryota
- Kingdom: Animalia
- Phylum: Chordata
- Clade: Sarcopterygii
- Clade: Tetrapodomorpha
- Order: †Nectridea
- Genus: †Arizonerpeton; Thayer, 1985

Type species
- Arizonerpeton wellsi Thayer, 1985

Extinct genus of tetrapodomorphs

Arizonerpeton is an extinct genus of nectridean tetrapodomorphs. It contains a single species, Arizonerpeton wellsi. It lived in what is now the Swisshelm Mountains of modern-day Arizona, United States. This locality belongs to the Black Prince Limestone Formation, which is dated to the middle Pennsylvanian sub-period of the Carboniferous period.

== Description ==
Arizonerpeton is known exclusively from a collection of unusual vertebrae collected by Robert Wells, the namesake of its specific name. These vertebrae can be designated as belonging to the order Nectridea, a collection of long-tailed limbed vertebrates that also includes the famous "boomerang-headed" Diplocaulus. Like other nectrideans, Arizonerpeton's vertebrae had a single main body (a pleurocentrum) fused to a plate-like neural spine jutting out of the top. The flared rims of the front and rear surfaces of the pleurocentum possesses small structures which would have formed tongue-and-groove articulations with other vertebrae. The "tongue" projected forward from the front rim while the "groove" was present between two projections on the rear rim. The only definitive feature classifying this genus as a nectridean lies in the fact that there are also two pairs of joint plates (zygapophyses) on each end of the vertebrae. The vertebrae are amphicoelous (hourglass-shaped) from the side, but not strongly so, and are covered in small pits. On the side of each vertebra, an extension known as a transverse process juts out perpendicularly, although also occasionally with a very slight upward angle.

The most unusual feature of these vertebrae lie in the fact that the neural spines are bifurcated. This means that a tall gap is present between the front and rear portions of each neural spine, effectively making it seem like there are two neural spines joined at the base. Vertebrae which are believed to have been part of the sacral (hip) region have shorter neural spines than those of the back, and are sightly titled backwards.

Less extreme neural spine bifurcation is also known in the early diplocaulid Diceratosaurus and some specimens of the urocordylid Ctenerpeton, two other nectrideans. In addition, the pitted vertebrae are somewhat similar to those of diplocaulids. However, the deep neural spine bifurcation and "tongue-and-groove" articulations possessed by Arizonerpeton are unknown in any other nectridean groups. As a result, Arizonerpeton is usually treated as a member of Nectridea incertae sedis.
