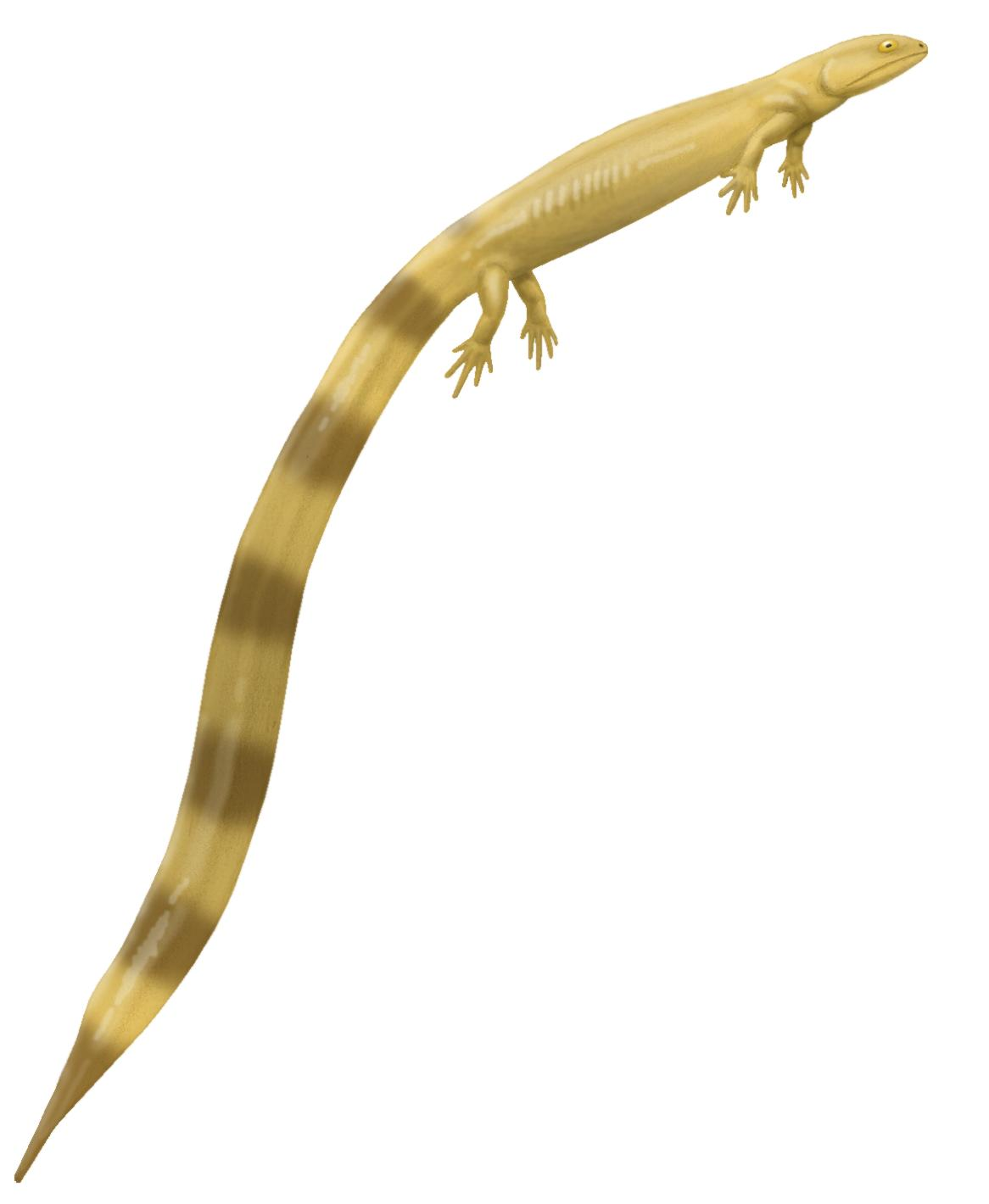
- Restoration of Urocordylus wandesfordii

Scientific classification
- Domain: Eukaryota
- Kingdom: Animalia
- Phylum: Chordata
- Clade: Sarcopterygii
- Clade: Tetrapodomorpha
- Order: †Nectridea
- Family: †Urocordylidae
- Subfamily: †Urocordylinae; Lydekker, 1889

Genera
- Ctenerpeton; Ptyonius; Urocordylus

= Urocordylinae =

Urocordylinae Temporal range: Late Carboniferous

Extinct subfamily of tetrapodomorphs

Urocordylinae is an extinct subfamily of nectridean tetrapodomorphs that includes several small newt-like species with short skulls and elongated, flattened tails. Urocordylinae belongs to the family Urocordylidae, which also includes the subfamily Sauropleurinae. Urocordylines lived during the Late Carboniferous and fossils are known from North America and Europe. The best-known urocordyline is Urocordylus from Ireland.
