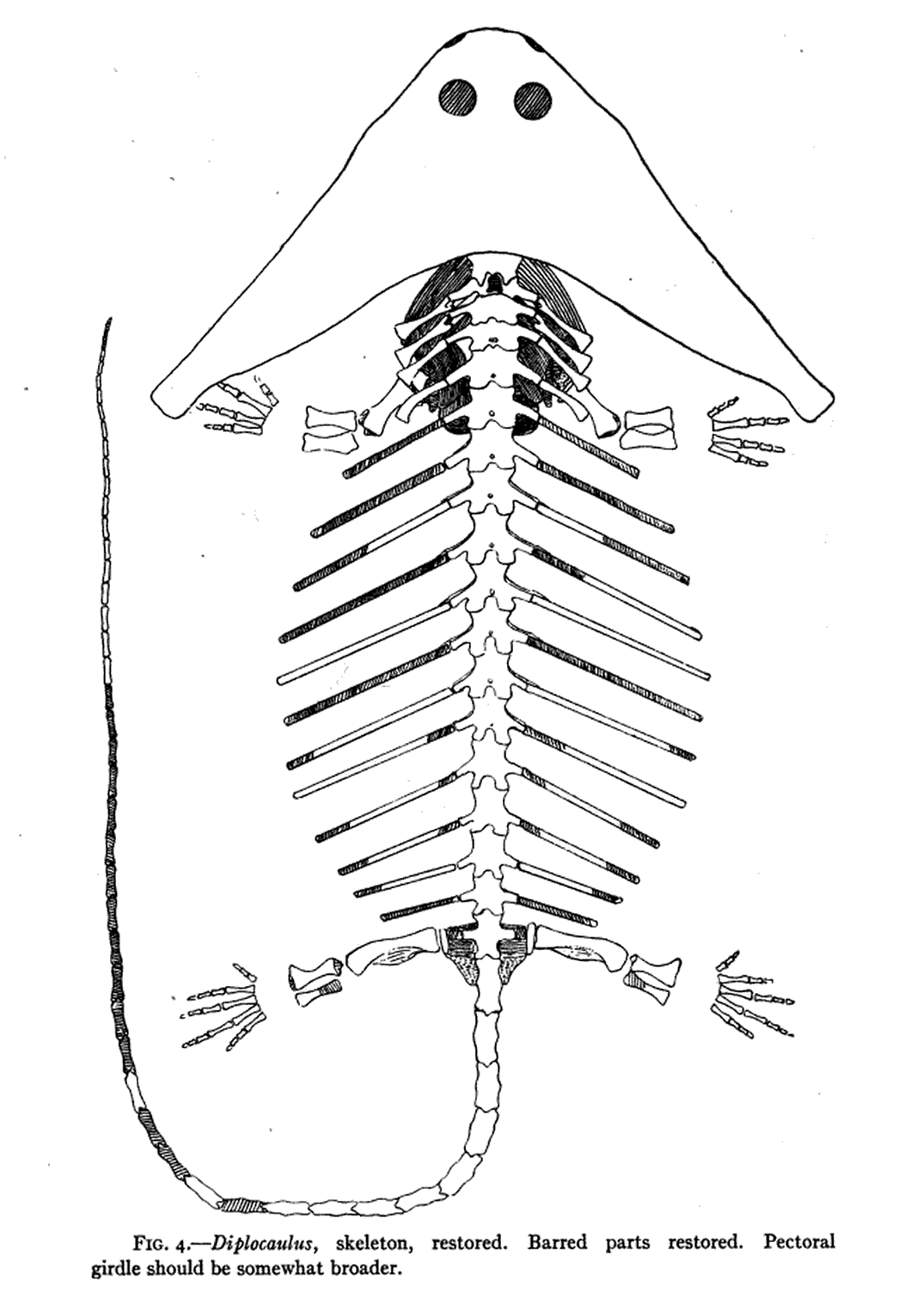
- A skeletal diagram of Diplocaulus

Scientific classification
- Kingdom: Animalia
- Phylum: Chordata
- Order: †Nectridea
- Family: †Diplocaulidae; Cope, 1881

Subgroups
- See text.

Synonyms
- Keraterpetontidae Jaekel, 1903

= Diplocaulidae =

Diplocaulidae Temporal range: Late Carboniferous - Late Permian

Extinct family of tetrapodomorphs

The Diplocaulidae ("double cauls") is an extinct family of "nectridean" tetrapodomorphs that arose during the Late Carboniferous and died out in the Late Permian. They are distinguished by the presence of strange, horn-like protrusions jutting out from the rear of their skulls; in some genera said protrusions gave their heads an almost boomerang-like outline.

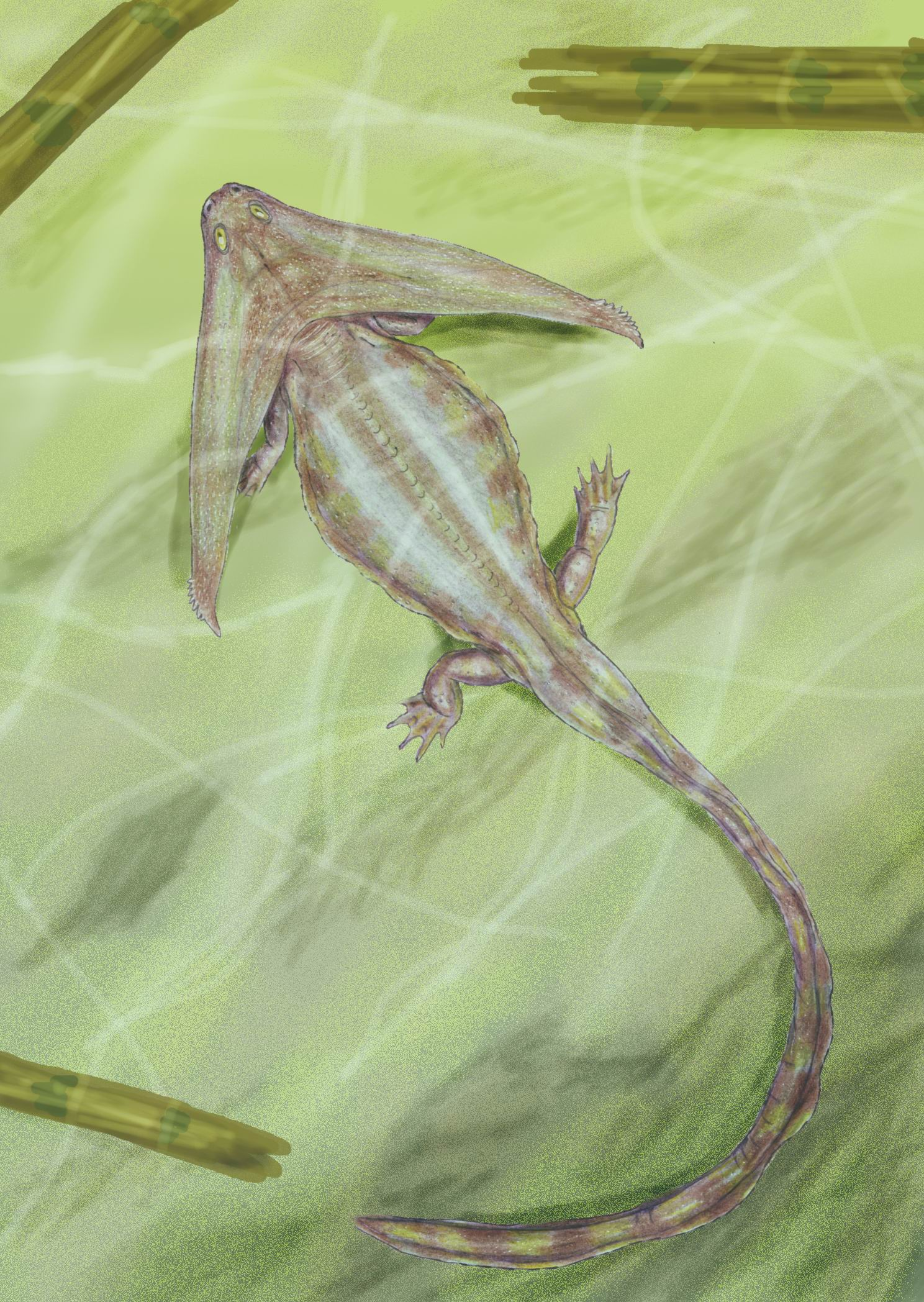
Diploceraspis burkei

== Phylogeny ==
Below is a cladogram modified from Germain (2010):

- Nectridea
  - Ptyonius
  - Urocordylidae
    - Sauropleura
    - Urocordylus
  - - Scincosaurus
    - Diplocaulidae
      - Keraterpeton
      - - Diceratosaurus
        - - Batrachiderpeton
          - - Peronedon
            - - Diplocaulus magnicornis
              - - Diploceraspis
                - Diplocaulus minimus
