= Beric Skews =

Professor Beric W. Skews - 25 April 1936 - 25 September 2026 was the director of the Flow Research Unit at the University of the Witwatersrand, South Africa. He was a leading expert in the field of compressible gas dynamics, and is author of over two hundred publications, mainly in the field of shock wave dynamics and high-speed photography.

== Introduction ==
Skews was born in 1936. He attended Wits University, and graduated with a bachelor's degree in Mechanical Engineering in 1957. He went on to complete a master's degree, and obtained his PhD in 1967, focusing on shockwave diffraction. He was instrumental in establishing a specialised aeronautical engineering degree at Wits university, which is still the only specialised degree of its type offered in Africa. He was attributed with the discovery of the four shock reflection pattern, now known as Guderley reflection.

He was active in both international and local professional bodies, including the International Advisory Committee on Shock Waves, the International Shock Wave Institute, and the organising and scientific committees of a number of international symposia and workshops, including being Chairman of two international meetings (1996 and 2001), one in South Africa and one in China. He was an editor of the journals Shock Waves and the Journal of Engineering Physics and Thermophysics. He was the founder President of the South African Institute of Aeronautical Engineers and has served twice as President of the Royal Aeronautical Society (Southern Africa Division).

In addition to carrying out a substantial amount of research in collaboration with scientists in Australia, Japan, Israel, Russia, China, Canada, Sweden, and the United States, he supervised numerous undergraduate and postgraduate research projects, and also lectured Compressible Gas Flow to final year Mechanical and Aeronautical Engineering students at Wits University.

== Research interests ==
Research interests include compressible flows in gases and liquids, with particular emphasis on shock wave interactions and fluid structure interactions, including structural deformation; as well as natural and industrial aerodynamics; flow visualization and experimental methods.

== Academic Positions ==
- 1959-1968 lecturer/senior lecturer, University of the Witwatersrand.
- 1969-1971 Associate Professor, McMaster University, Canada
- 1972-1978 Professor, Aeronautical Engineering, Witwatersrand University
- 1979-1986 Research Manager, Eskom
- 1987- 2001 Professor, Mechanical Engineering, Witwatersrand University
- 2002- Director, Flow Research Unit, Witwatersrand University

== Achievements ==
Skews has been placed in the 'A' category of researchers (world leaders) by the National Research Foundation.

In 2008, Skews was awarded an Honorary Fellowship of the Royal Aeronautical Society in London. This award recognises the contributions he made to the setting up of the aeronautical engineering degree at Wits in the sixties and in which he was the first Chair incumbent. This remains the only internationally recognized formal degree in this field in South Africa. He was also heavily involved in maintaining international links during the difficult period of South Africa's political isolation, acting as President of the indigenous South African Institute of Aeronautical Engineers and the Southern Africa Division of the Royal Aeronautical Society, on more than one occasion.
