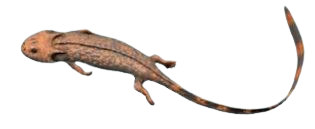
- Modern life reconstruction of K. galvani by Nobu Tamura, 2021

Scientific classification
- Kingdom: Animalia
- Phylum: Chordata
- Order: †Nectridea
- Family: †Diplocaulidae
- Genus: †Keraterpeton; Etheridge, 1866 vide Huxley & Wright, 1868

Type species
- †Keraterpeton galvani Huxley & Wright, 1868

Other species
- †K. gigas Fritsch, 1889; †K. longtoni Carroll et al., 1998; †K. punctolineatum Cope, 1875

Synonyms
- Ceraterpeton Etheridge, 1866 (preoccupied); Ceraterpetum Böttger, 1886; Keraterpetum Andrews, 1895

= Keraterpeton =

Keraterpeton Temporal range: Late Carboniferous

Extinct genus of tetrapodomorphs

Keraterpeton is an extinct genus of "nectridean" tetrapodomorphs, previously included within the monotypic Keraterpedontidae family, from the Carboniferous period of Europe (Czech Republic, England and Ireland) and North America (United States); it is the oldest known member of the family Diplocaulidae.

== Discovery and naming ==
The type species is Keraterpeton galvani, named in 1866 as Ceraterpeton by Robert Etheridge and later amended to Keraterpeton in 1868 by Thomas Henry Huxley and Edward Percival Wright; three years earlier (in November 1865), they were authorised by William Bookey Brownrigg to describe some fossil vertebrates in his collection, and among them was NHMING F 14735, the holotype of Keraterpeton galvani, which was discovered in the Jarrow Colliery in County Kilkenny, Ireland.

== Description ==
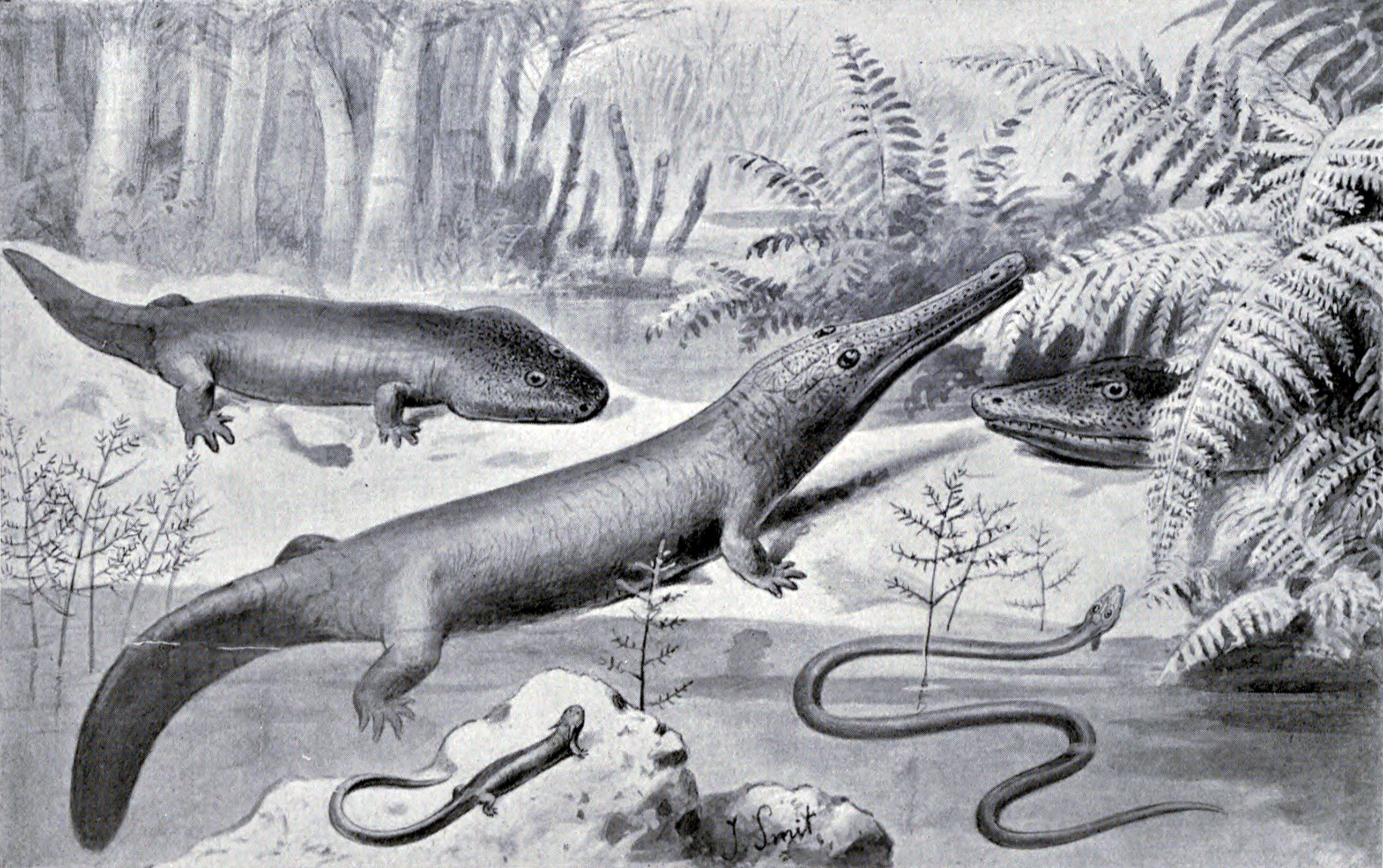
An outdated restoration of Keraterpeton and other Permian "amphibians" by Joseph Smit, 1910

Keraterpeton was a salamander-like creature about 30 centimetres (12 in) long. Its tail was remarkably long taking up two thirds of the animal's total length, and was laterally flattened, presumably to aid in swimming. Its skull was round and short, especially when compared to its Permian relative, Diplocaulus. Its hind legs had five toes, and were longer than the forelimbs, which had only four toes.

Keraterpeton was flattened side-ways, which would have helped push itself through the murky waters of the coal swamps in which it lived. The five-toed hind legs were longer than the four-toed fore-feet and the short, rounded skull had eyes set far forward. Although Keraterpeton had a long body, it did not have more vertebrae than most other amphibian species (15–26 on average).
