= Ctenerpeton =

Scientific classification
- Kingdom: Animalia
- Phylum: Chordata
- Order: †Nectridea
- Family: †Urocordylidae
- Subfamily: †Urocordylinae
- Genus: †Ctenerpeton; Cope, 1897

Extinct genus of tetrapodomorphs

Ctenerpeton is an extinct genus of nectridean tetrapodomorphs within the family Urocordylidae.
