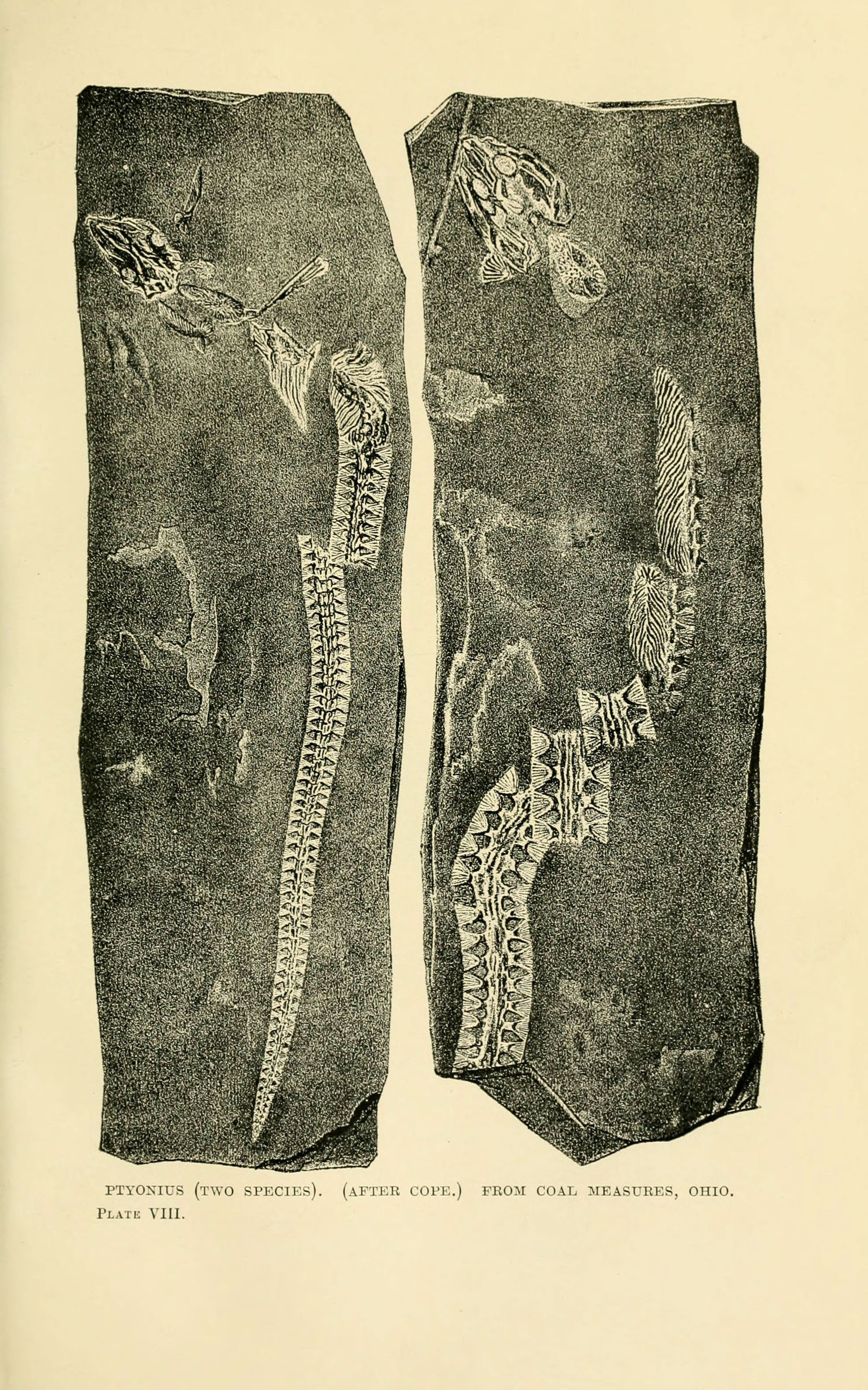
- Fossils of two Ptyonius specimens

Scientific classification
- Kingdom: Animalia
- Phylum: Chordata
- Order: †Nectridea
- Family: †Urocordylidae
- Subfamily: †Urocordylinae
- Genus: †Ptyonius; Cope, 1875

= Ptyonius =

Extinct genus of tetrapodomorphs

Ptyonius is an extinct genus of nectridean tetrapodomorphs within the family Urocordylidae.
