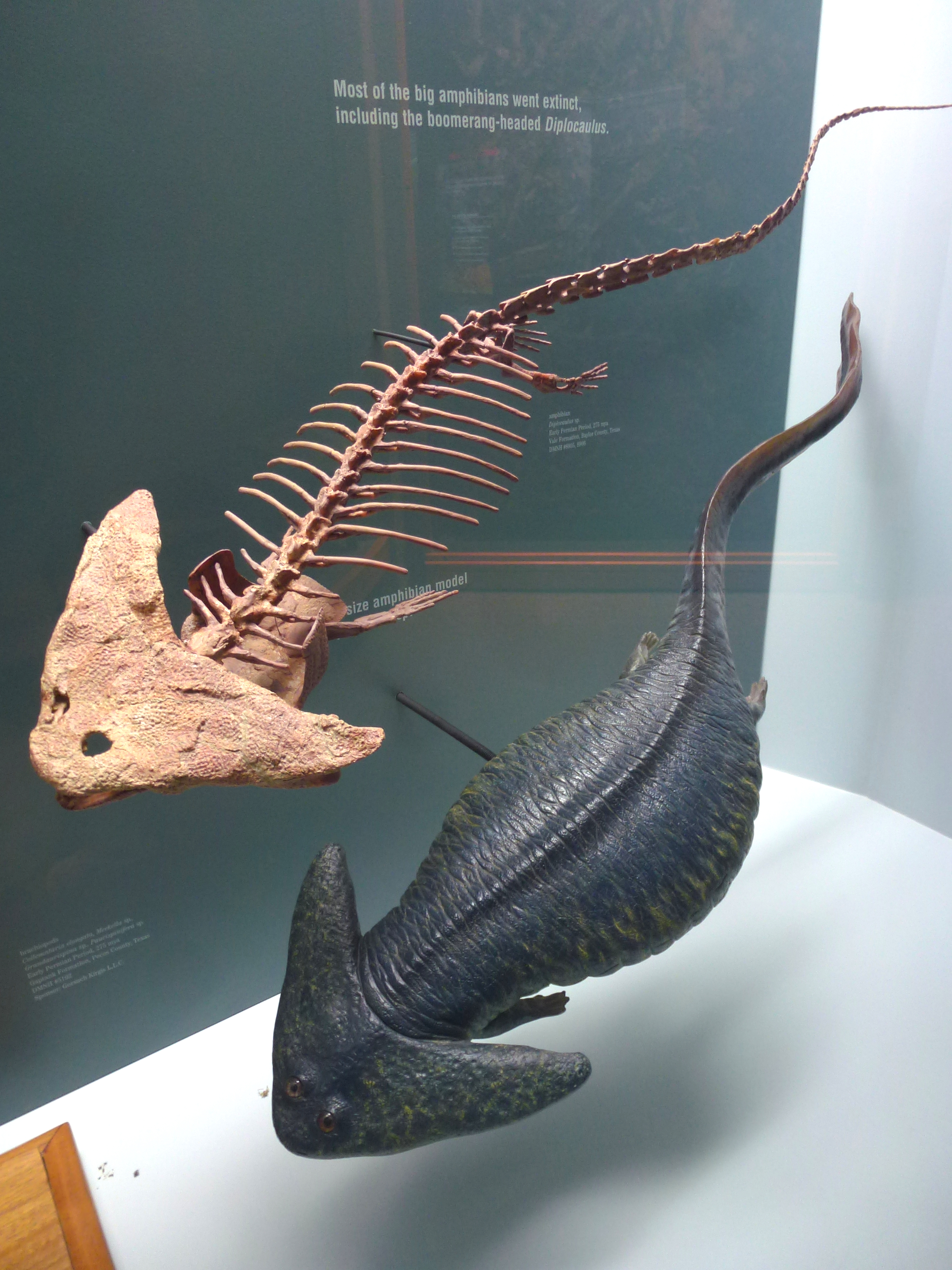
- Skeleton and model of Diplocaulus

Scientific classification
- Kingdom: Animalia
- Phylum: Chordata
- Clade: Stegocephali
- Order: †Nectridea; Miall, 1875

Subgroups
- Albadris; Arizonerpeton; Diplocaulidae; Scincosauridae; Urocordylidae

= Nectridea =

Nectridea Temporal range: Late Carboniferous–Lopingian

Extinct order of amphibians

Nectridea is an extinct order of lepospondyl tetrapods from the Carboniferous and Permian periods, including amphibious animals such as Diplocaulus. In appearance, they would have superficially resembled modern newts or aquatic salamanders, although they are not close relatives of modern amphibians (Lissamphibia). They were characterized by long, flattened tails to aid in swimming, as well as numerous features of the vertebrae.

== Description ==
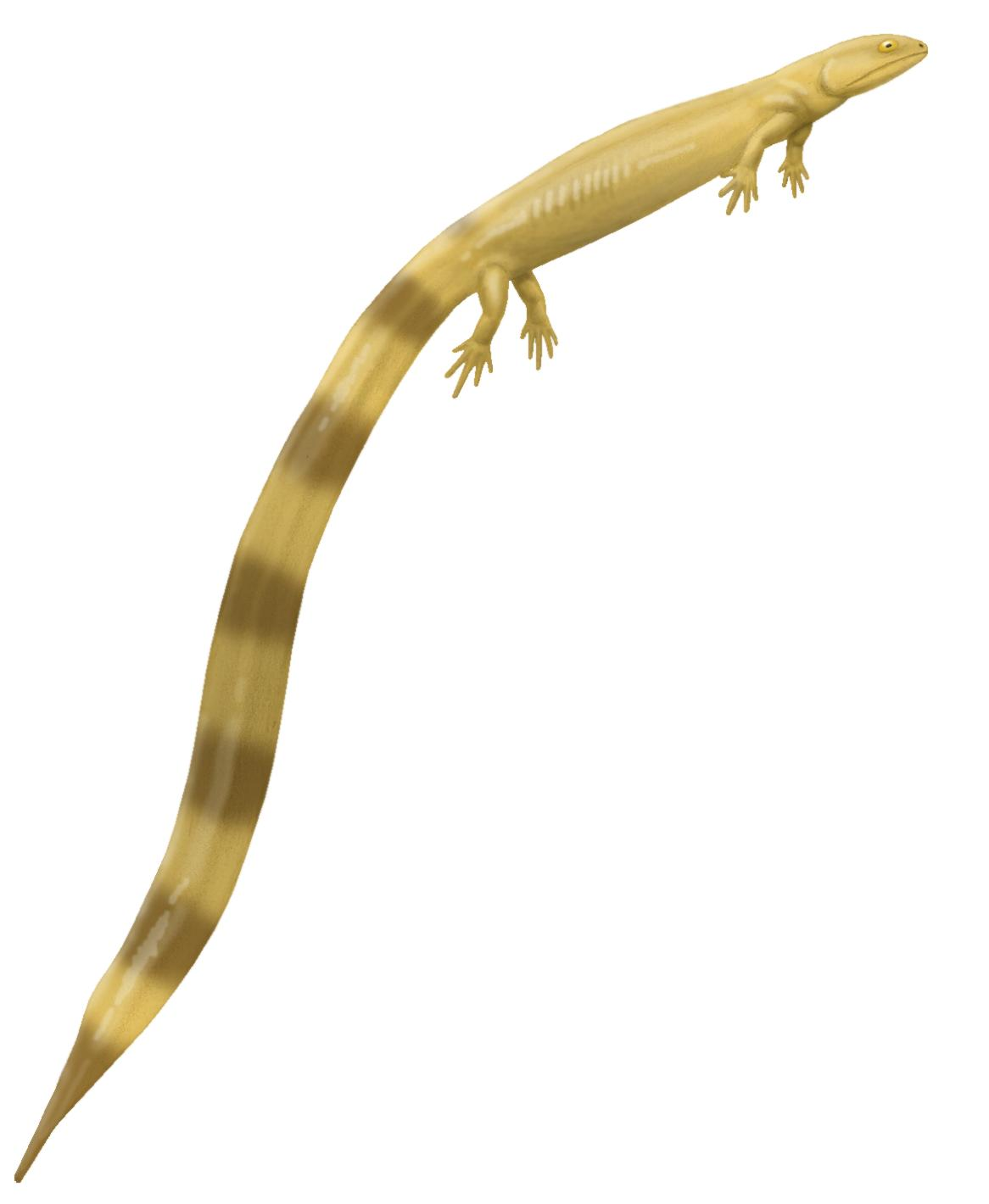
Life restoration of Urocordylus, a urocordylid

Nectrideans are a diverse group of tetrapods, including the aquatic Urocordylidae, the presumably terrestrial Scincosauridae, and the bizarre horned members of Diplocaulidae (also known as Keraterpetonidae), which includes the "boomerang-headed" Diplocaulus, one of the most famous genera of prehistoric amphibians (in the traditional sense of the word). By the time the earliest known nectrideans appeared in the Late Carboniferous fossil record, they had already diversified into these families, indicating that basal nectrideans are unknown. These different families are united primarily by features of the spinal column rather than the skull.

=== Vertebrae ===
In many groups of early tetrapods, each vertebra is formed by three parts: an intercentrum at the front, a pleurocentrum at the back, and a plate-like neural spine jutting out from the top of the vertebrae which may be positioned between the two or fused to the pleurocentrum. In nectrideans, only the pleurocentra are present, and the neural spines are completely fused to them. Their vertebrae also possess an extra set of joints connecting the vertebrae (apophyses), just above the typical set (zygapophyses). Furthermore, their caudal (tail) vertebrae also possess haemal spines which jut out from the bottom of each vertebra. While most early tetrapods have slanted haemal spines which are positioned between the vertebrae, the haemal spines of nectrideans are completely vertical in orientation and fused to the pleurocentra, directly opposite the neural spines. Both the neural spines and haemal spines of the tail are characteristically fan-shaped. As a whole, nectrideans have rather short bodies and long and paddle-like tails, adapted for swimming.

=== Other features ===
Almost all early tetrapods have three coronoid bones lining the inside edge of each side of the jaw. Nectrideans, however, only have one. Their clavicular blades (shoulder girdles) are wide and possess a short rear extension, while the scapulocoracoids (shoulder blades) are weakly ossified.

They also had well-developed hind limbs, with a full set of five toes each. Their forelimbs were slightly reduced, but not to the same extent as in microsaurs and other lepospondyls. Although Urocordylus retained five fingers, most nectridieans had only four, similar to modern amphibians.

== Paleobiology ==
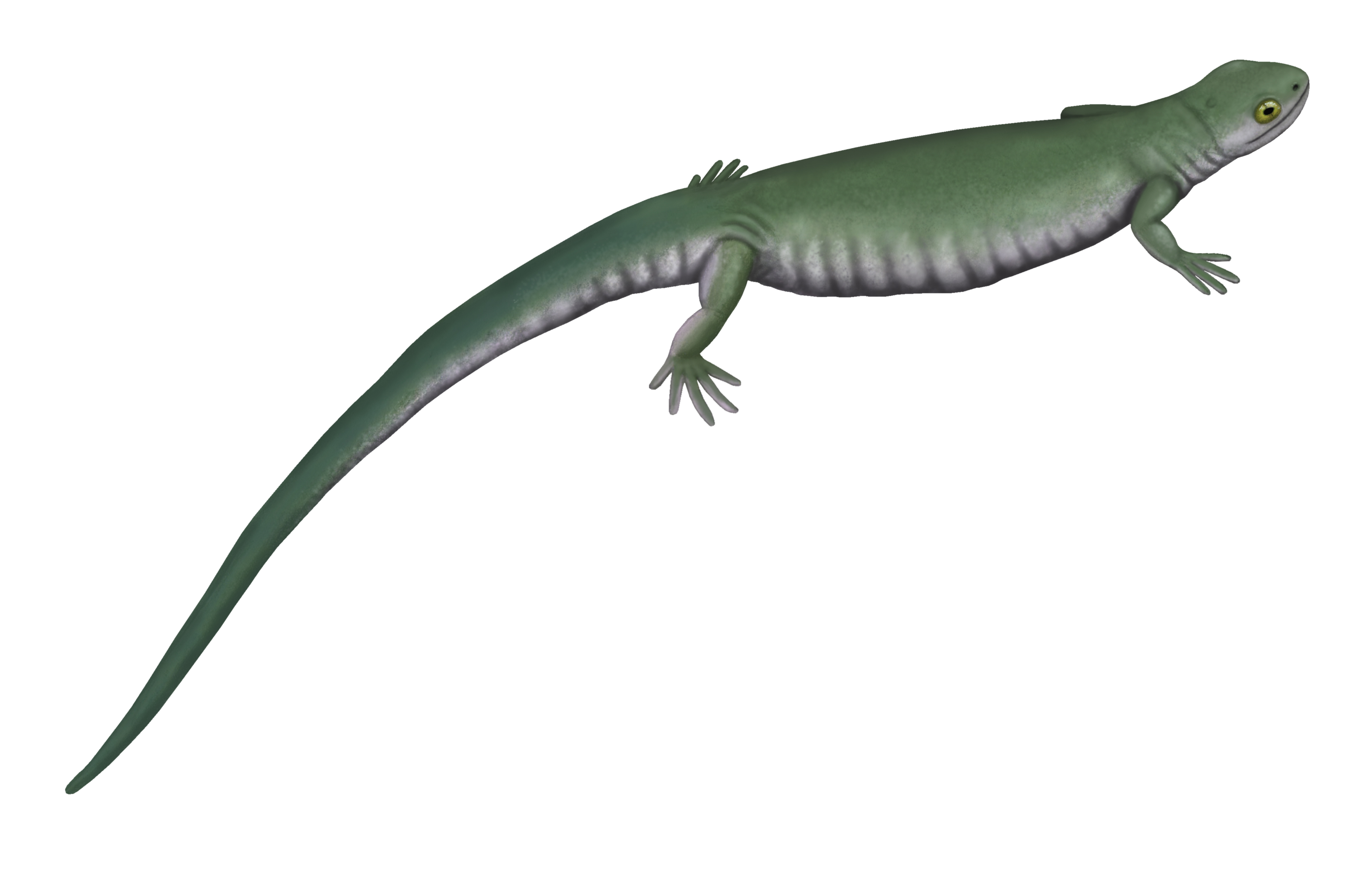
Life restoration of Scincosaurus, a scincosaurid

Both diplocaulids and urocordylids are considered to be completely aquatic, although only diplocaulids possess lateral line canals on their skulls. However, this does not mean that urocordylids lacked lateral lines, as several modern amphibians possess that organ without any skeletal indication. Scincosaurids have much more well-ossified limbs and thinner tails than other nectrideans, and are usually considered to be terrestrial. However, some have been reported to possess lines of pits on the skull, which may be an indication that they were amphibious rather than purely terrestrial.

A trace fossil known as Hermundurichnus fornicatus of a tetrapod resting on a lake bed may have been attributed to Diplocaulus or an animal like it. This trace indicates that the underside of nectrideans was covered in small, diamond-shaped scales and that the "horns" of the skull were connected with the body by flaps of skin.

== Classification ==
There has been some controversy over the precise classification of Nectridea over the past century, and even whether it constitutes a valid monophyletic clade. A few older studies consider nectrideans to be very basal tetrapods, related to Ichthyostega or colosteids. However, most studies generally place nectrideans inside the subclass Lepospondyli. Aistopoda, a group of legless lepospondyls, have often been allied with particular families of nectrideans, but not the order as a whole. For example, Anderson (2001) positioned diplocaulids as close relatives of Aistopods with urocordylids and scincosaurids as progressively more primitive members of the group. On the other hand, Ruta et al. (2003) claimed that urocordylids were closer to aistopods. As aistopods do not possess most nectridean features, they have traditionally been excluded from the group. However, this would make Nectridea an invalid paraphyletic group as the aistopods, may have been descended from nectrideans, are not considered nectrideans themselves.

At least some nectrideans may be stem-tetrapods, less closely related to modern terrestrial vertebrates than all terrestrial vertebrates are to each other.

The following is a cladogram from Ruta et al. (2003):

- †Lepospondyli
  - - Batropetes fritschi
    - Tuditanomorpha
  - - - Microbrachis pelikani
      - - Hyloplesion longicostatum
        - Odonterpeton triangulare
    - - Lysorophia
      - - Adelospondyli
        - Holospondyli
          - - Aistopoda
            - Urocordylidae
          - - Diplocaulidae
            - Scincosauridae

In their 2026 description of the Scottish nectridean Albadris, Herring and colleagues used the phylogenetic dataset of Milner & Ruta (2009) under maximum parsimony to recover the following tree, with aistopods as the outgroup to a clade formed by Urocordylidae as the sister group to Scincosaurus (Scincosauridae) + Diplocaulidae. These results are displayed in the cladogram below:

- †Lepospondyli
  - Microbrachis
  - - Aistopoda
    - Nectridea
      - Urocordylidae
        - - Crossotelos
          - Sauropleura
        - - Urocordylus
          - - Ctenerpeton
            - Ptyonius
      - - Scincosaurus
        - Diplocaulidae
          - Keraterpeton
          - - Batrachiderpeton
            - - Diceratosaurus
              - - Diplocaulus
                - - Albadris
                  - Diploceraspis
