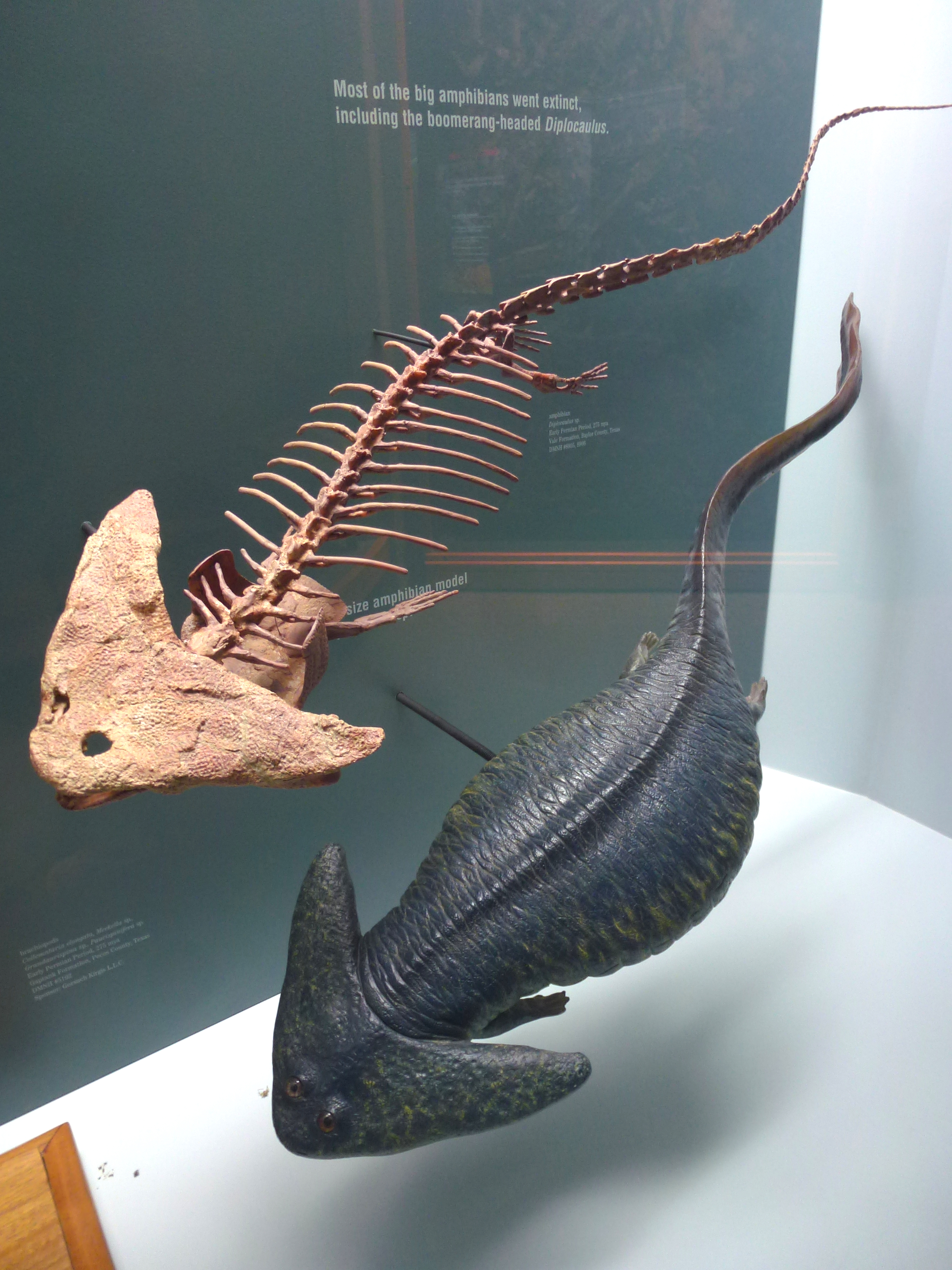
- Reconstructed skeleton and life restoration model of Diplocaulus at the Denver Museum of Nature and Science

Scientific classification
- Kingdom: Animalia
- Phylum: Chordata
- Order: †Nectridea
- Family: †Diplocaulidae
- Genus: †Diplocaulus; Cope, 1877

Species
- †D. salamandroides Cope, 1877(type); †D. magnicornis Cope, 1882; †D. brevirostris Olson, 1951; †D. recurvatus? Olson, 1952; †D. minimus? Dutuit, 1988

Synonyms
- Genus-level: Permoplatyops Case, 1946; Species-level: Diplocaulus limbatus Cope, 1895; Diplocaulus copei Broili, 1904; Diplocaulus pusillus? Broili, 1904; Permoplatyops parvus (Williston, 1918 [originally Platyops parvus]); Diplocaulus primigenius Mehl, 1921; Diplocaulus parvus Olson, 1972

= Diplocaulus =

Diplocaulus Temporal range: Pennsylvanian to Lopingian (Kasimovian to Wuchiapingian), 307–257 Ma

Extinct genus of amphibians

Diplocaulus (meaning "double stalk") is an extinct genus of lepospondyl amphibians which lived from the Late Carboniferous to the Late Permian of North America and Africa. Diplocaulus is by far the largest and best-known of the lepospondyls, characterized by a distinctive boomerang-shaped skull. Remains attributed to Diplocaulus have been found from the Late Permian of Morocco and represent the youngest-known occurrence of a lepospondyl.

== Description ==
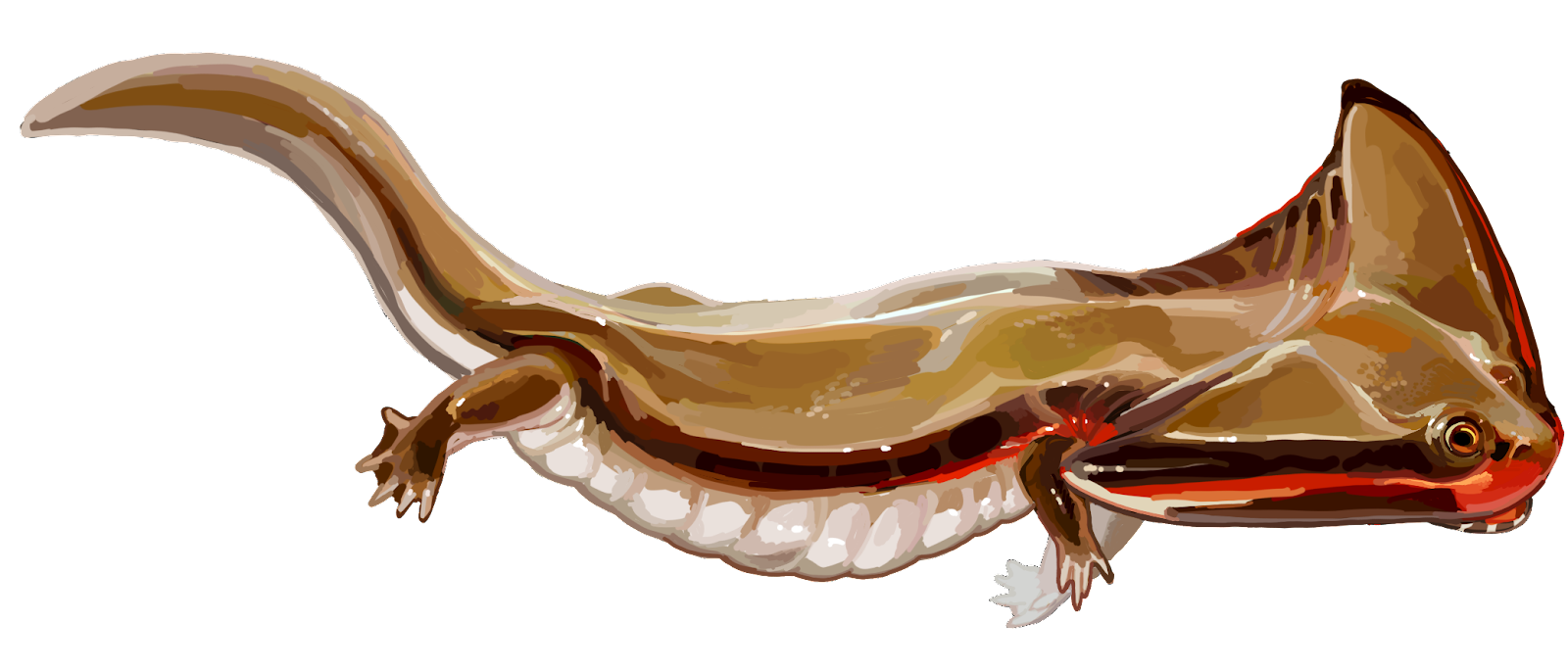
Artist's reconstruction of D. magnicornis with conservative skin flaps attached to its tabular horns

Diplocaulus had a stocky, salamander-like body, but was relatively large, reaching up to 1 m (3.3 ft) in length. Although a complete tail is unknown for the genus, a nearly complete articulated skeleton described in 1917 preserved a row of tail vertebrae near the head. This was construed as circumstantial evidence for a long, thin tail capable of reaching the head if the animal was curled up. Most studies since this discovery have argued that anguiliform (eel-like) tail movement was the main force of locomotion utilized by Diplocaulus and its relatives.

=== Horns ===
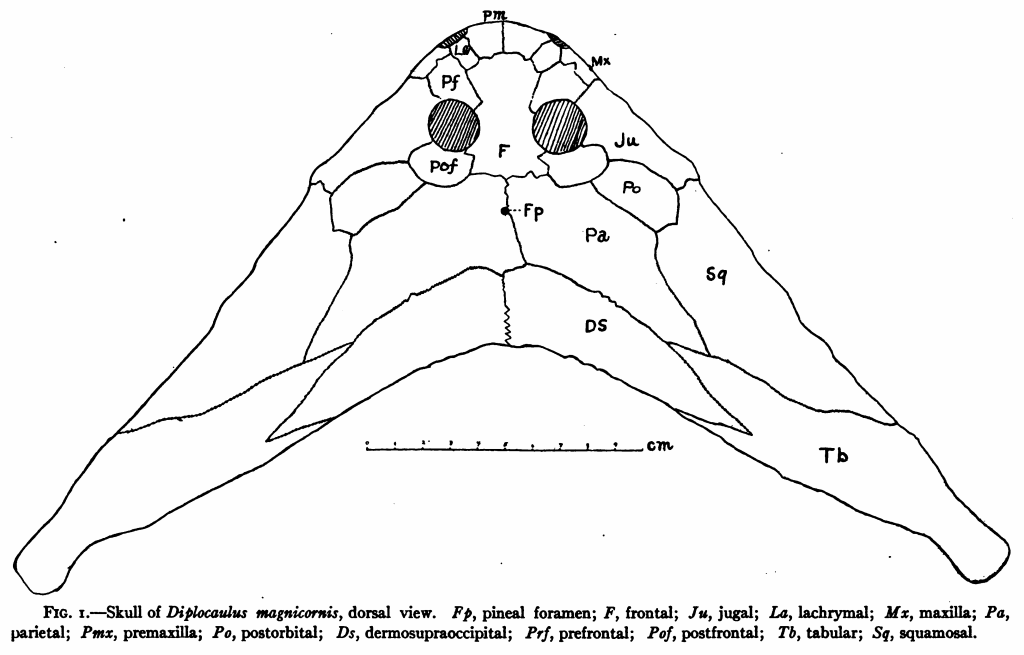
A skull diagram of D. magnicornis by Douthitt (1917), whose identifications of skull bones closely match those of modern sources

The most distinctive features of this genus and its closest relatives were a pair of long protrusions or horns at the rear of the skull, giving the head a boomerang-like shape. Most of the outer/front edge of each horn was formed by the elongated, blade-like squamosal bone. The rear edge of the skull and horns, on the other hand, was formed by the postparietal bones, also known as dermosupraoccipitals in older publications. The primary component of each horn (including the tips) is a long bone with a historically controversial identification. Many early sources considered the bone to be a tabular, which in other early tetrapods is a small bone lying at the rear edge of the skull.

Olson (1951) argued that the bone's contact with the parietals excluded the possibility of it being a tabular. He argued it was the supratemporal bone, which had enlarged and shifted towards the rear tip of the skull. Beerbower (1963) countered Olson's reasoning by pointing out that Urocordylus, a newt-like relative of Diplocaulus, retained both a supratemporal bone and a tabular bone. In Urocordylus, the tabular lies closer to the back of the skull and even contacts the parietals, invalidating Olson's main point. Based on this observation, it is more likely that the primary bone of the horns in Diplocaulus is a tabular. Many studies (even a later publication by Olson) now refer to Diplocaulus horns as tabular horns based on Beerbower's argument.

== Species ==
=== D. salamandroides ===
D. salamandroides was the first species of Diplocaulus to be discovered. Remains from this species were discovered near Danville, Illinois by William Gurley and J.C. Winslow, a pair of local geologists. The fossils were later described by renowned paleontologist Edward Drinker Cope in 1877. This species is only known from a small number of vertebrae sent to Cope by Gurley and Winslow. These vertebrae were noted for their similarities to those of salamanders (hence the specific name salamandroides), although Cope was reluctant to refer them to any known group. A large jaw bone with labyrinthodont teeth was associated with some of these vertebrae, but it was much larger than expected for the vertebrae and likely belonged to Eryops or some other larger amphibian. D. salamandroides could be distinguished from D. magnicornis by its small size (from a fifth to a sixth the size of the latter) and less pronounced accessory articular processes (at the time identified as zygosphene-zygantrum articulations).

The rocks in which these fossils were discovered had been informally referred to as the "Clepsydrops shales", named after a local genus of early synapsid by Cope in 1865. The shales were initially believed to be from either the Permian or Triassic periods in age based on the purported presence of reptile and lungfish fossils. By 1878, Cope had decided that the site was Permian. In 1908, E.C. Case noted that the shales also contain remains from fish which were from the late Carboniferous and early Permian periods. He argued that, while the Clepsydrops shales of Illinois and the similar red beds of Texas were evidently formed after the major Carboniferous coal deposits, there was not sufficient evidence to exclude them from the Carboniferous period itself. Nowadays the Clepsydrops shales are typically assigned to the McLeansboro or Mattoon formations. D. salamandroides fossils have also been found in Pennsylvania. These formations are now believed to be Missourian (late Carboniferous) in age.

=== D. magnicornis ===
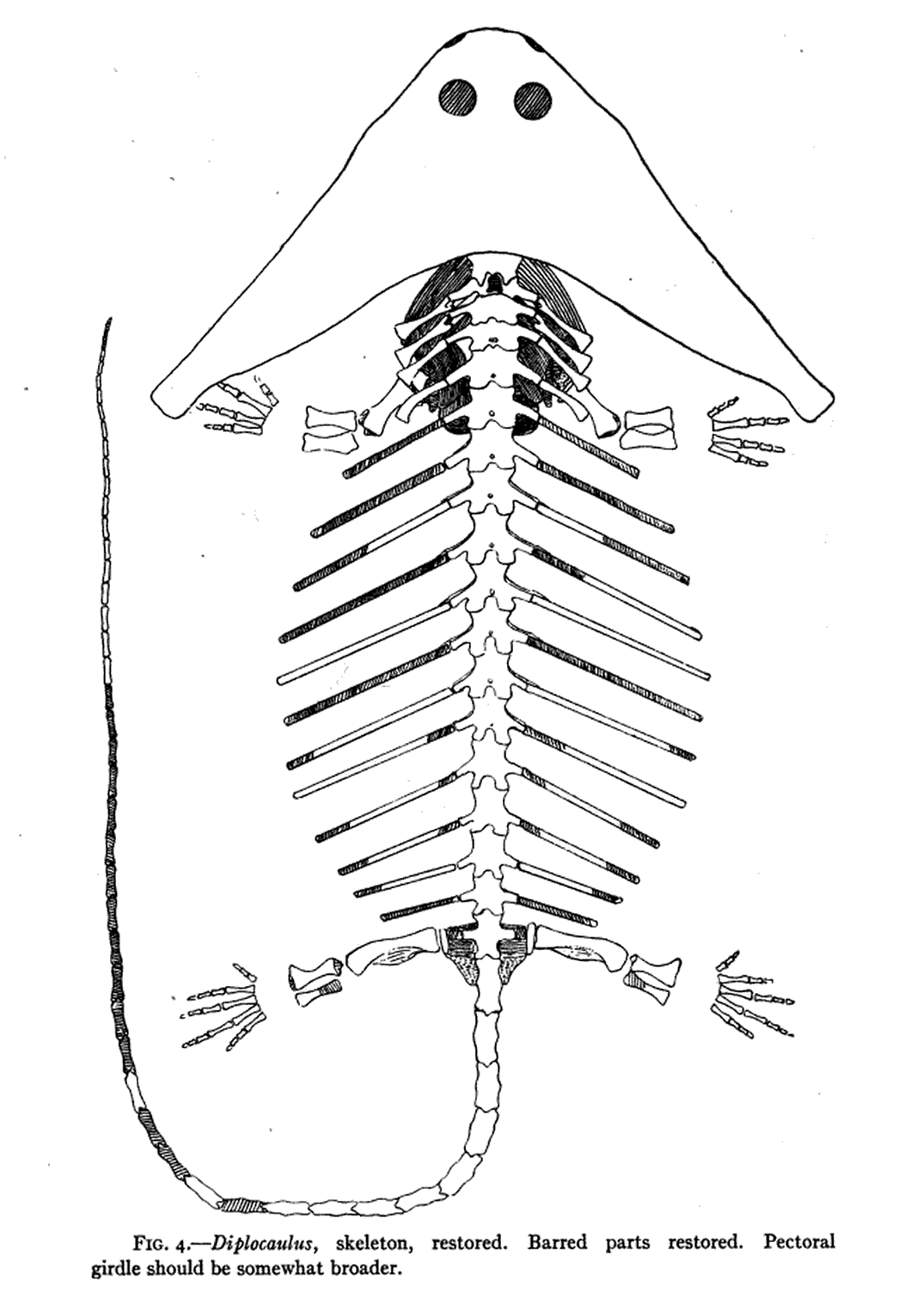
A skeletal diagram of Diplocaulus magnicornis by Douthitt (1917), with barred parts restored

This species, described by Cope in 1882, is by far the most common and well-described member of the genus. D. magnicornis was the first species known from more than vertebrae, and it allowed Cope and other paleontologists to realize the nature of Diplocaulus as a bizarre long-horned "batrachian" (amphibian). Much of modern knowledge on the genus is based on this species, as it outnumbers any other Diplocaulus remains by hundreds of specimens. D. magnicornis had a wide temporal distribution throughout the red beds of Texas and Oklahoma.

=== D. brevirostris ===
D. brevirostris was similar to D. magnicornis, although it was significantly more rare. It is represented by a small number of specimens found in a narrow portion of the Texas red beds, specifically the Arroyo Formation of the Clear Fork Group. This species can be differentiated from D. magnicornis by the much shorter and blunter snout compared to the length of the skull as a whole. In addition, the horns are more elongated, the parietals have a convex upper surface, and the rear edge of the skull is more strongly and smoothly curved. While juvenile members of D. magnicornis also have a smoothly curved rear edge of the skull, all known D. brevirostris specimens are clearly adults as shown by their robust skull ornamentation, long horns, and large size. Therefore, this trait is a legitimate distinguishing feature of adult specimens of this species. The only specimen known from more than a skull is the type specimen, AM 4470, which preserves some vertebrae similar to those of "D. primigenius". E.C. Olson, the original describer of the species, suggested that it occupied different habitats than D. magnicornis such as mountain streams, accounting for its comparative rarity. However, other studies have suggested that D. magnicornis would have lived in similar environments, invalidating Olson's hypothesis.

=== D. recurvatus ===
This species, from the Vale Formation of the Texas red beds, was very similar to D. magnicornis, and partially coexisted alongside that species in younger strata. Olson hypothesized that D. recurvatus may have been descended from an early stock of D. magnicornis. D. recurvatus differs from D. magnicornis in one specific trait: the tips of the tabular horns are "crooked". The tips are bent relative to the rest of the horns, and abruptly taper. Comparison to a growth series of D. magnicornis indicates that D. recurvatus specimens had developmental pathways which significantly differed from D. magnicornis. For example, skull length and width seem to be inversely correlated in D. recurvatus and directly correlated in D. magnicornis. In addition, the restriction in the horns of D. recurvatus develops in an area which would otherwise expand in adult D. magnicornis.

=== D. minimus ===
Diplocaulus minimus is a species known from the Ikakern Formation of Morocco. It had an unusually asymmetrical skull, with the left prong being long and tapering as in other species but the right prong being much shorter and more rounded. This feature was present in multiple skulls referred to this species, so it is very unlikely to be a result of crushing or distortion. Some studies have suggested that this species is more closely related to Diploceraspis than to Diplocaulus magnicornus. This may suggest that either Diplocaulus is not a true monophyletic genus, that Diploceraspis is a junior synonym of the genus, or that "Diplocaulus" minimus represents a distinct genus.

=== Dubious species ===
- D. limbatus was the third species of Diplocaulus to be named, and remained the second most well known member of the genus until the 1950s. It was described by E.D. Cope in 1895 based on several incomplete specimens found in the Texas red beds. The type specimen was a poorly preserved skull and partial skeleton designated AM 4471. Cope found that the skull of this specimen had shorter, thinner horns than those of D. magnicornis, as well as a seemingly unique feature: a large notch separating the quadratojugal from the rest of the tabular horn. E.C. Case later provided additional distinctions present in a skull referred to D. limbatus, including smoother edges to the skull, larger eyes, and more pointed horns. However, additional D. limbatus specimens prepared by Douthitt have shown that many of Case's identifications were erroneous, and that only the notch identified by Cope could be used to distinguish it from D. magnicornis. In 1951, E.C. Olson concluded that AM 4471 was too poorly preserved to differentiate from D. magnicornis, and therefore he designated D. limbatus as a synonym of that species. However, he also analyzed the referred D. limbatus skull described by Case, AM 4470, and found that it was unique enough to qualify as the type specimen of a new Diplocaulus species: D. brevirostris.
- D. copei and D. pusillus were both named by German paleontologist Ferdinand Broili in 1904. D. copei was known from three Texan specimens, all of which were heavily crushed and incomplete. Broili argued that this species was unique due to its small size and horns which bend inwards. However, E.C. Case could find no way to distinguish between its specimens and those of D. magnicornis and "D. limbatus", and he rejected the species as indeterminate, a decision followed by later sources. D. pusillus, known from a pair of minuscule skulls found in Texas and stored at the Palaeontological Museum of Munich, is a more controversial species. The skulls are distinctive compared to adult Diplocaulus specimens from other species, and some early sources have doubted their referral to the genus. These sources voiced a possibility that the skulls came from some other amphibian from the area, such as Trimerorhachis. In 1918, S.W. Williston used the D. pusillus specimens as the basis for Platyops parvus, a new genus of diplocaulid. In 1946, E.C. Case revised Williston's name to Permoplatyops parvus, as the genus name "Platyops" was already in use. He brought up the possibility that the skulls were from an extremely young Diplocaulus, and in response Olson (1951) designated D. pusillus (and therefore Permoplatyops parvus) as a synonym of one of the other red bed Diplocaulus species, such as D. magnicornis.
- D. primigenius was described in 1921 by M.G. Mehl based on a single specimen preserving a skull, shoulder elements, and a string of vertebrae. The skull was seemingly identical to that of D. magnicornis, but the vertebrae were peculiar. They were quite enlarged, particularly the neural spines which were tall, rough structures with a depression at their highest extent. E.C. Olson (1951) noted that the vertebrae were comparable to those of the holotype of D. brevirostris (AM 4470), but also that the skull was much more akin to D. magnicornis instead. While Olson did decide to synonymize D. primigenius with D. magnicornis, he also noted that the specimen remained an interesting conundrum with implications for the disconnect between vertebral and skull development in Diplocaulus.
- D. parvus, named by E.C. Olson in 1972, was designated as a new species with no connection whatsoever with "Permoplatyops parvus", which at that point was treated as a synonym of D. magnicornis. D. parvus is known from a single specimen from the Chickasha Formation of Oklahoma. It was generally very similar to D. recurvatus, differing primarily due to its smaller size as isolated geographical location. Germain (2010) did not consider these traits sufficient to justify retaining D. parvus separate from D. recurvatus. The D. parvus specimen is potentially the youngest Diplocaulus fossil recovered from North America, at about 270 million years old.

== Paleobiology ==
=== Function of the tabular horns ===
Various hypotheses have been put forth to the purpose of these horns. One of the earliest suggestions, provided by S.W. Williston in 1909, was that they protected external gills, but in 1911 E.C. Case pointed out that there was slim evidence for this idea. Another hypothesis was provided in a dissertation, published by University of Kansas professor Herman Douthitt in 1917, which focused entirely on the anatomy of Diplocaulus. Douthitt argued that the most undisputed function was that the horns acted as a counterweight to offset the heavily-built forward part of the head which would have been difficult to lift otherwise. However, he also noted that this was probably not their primary function, and that they may have been maladaptive developments "as the result of some internal metabolic derangement". In his 1986 book, The Dinosaur Heresies, Robert Bakker speculated that Diplocaulus used its tabular horns for intraspecific combat, utilizing sweeping sideways motions of the head to inflict blunt-force poking and jabbing attacks.

In 1951, E.C. Olson suggested that the horns could have supported skin flaps capable of assisting the animal in skate- or stingray-like locomotion. However, he admitted that his suggestion was entirely conjectural considering a lack of soft tissue evidence. He also briefly proposed other possible functions, such as the use of the broad head as a burrowing tool to escape predators or survive droughts. J.R. Beerbower revived the hypothesis that the horns were involved in respiration during his 1963 description of Diploceraspis, which was a close relative of Diplocaulus. His argument relied on the possibility that the horns supported operculum-like vertical pouches protecting external or internal gills. One possibility is that the shape was defensive, since even a large predator (such as Eryops) would have a hard time trying to swallow a creature with such a wide head.

==== Lift ====
A new hypothesis for the function of the horns was presented by South African paleontologist Arthur Cruickshank and fluid dynamicist B.W. Skews in a 1980 paper. They proposed that the tabular horns acted as a hydrofoil, allowing the animal to more easily control how water flows over its head. In the process of their investigation, Cruickshank & Skews developed a full-scale model of the head and a portion of the body of a Diplocaulus, constructed from balsa wood and modelling clay. The model was placed in a wind tunnel, and subjected to several tests to determine drag, lift, and other forces experienced by the head in different situations.

The results showed that the horns generated significant lift, which would have allowed the animal to rise in the water column of a river or stream quite quickly and easily. Lift was present when the head was parallel to the flow of water (modeled by air), with lift increasing at a higher attack angle (angle above the horizontal) and only dropping once the head reached a high stall angle of 22 degrees. Lift and pitching moment was minimized at 1.5 degrees below the horizontal, which may have been the natural resting angle of the head.

When the "mouth" of the model was opened, lift was barely affected, the pitching moment decreased, and drag only slightly increased. This indicates that Diplocaulus would not have been seriously disadvantaged if they chose to attack prey items while rising through the water. Cruickshank & Skews also glued numerous small spheres to the model in order to test how an irregular texture would affect the mechanics of the head. The highly irregular spheres drastically reduced lift and increased drag, but when they were rubbed off (leaving only the slightly irregular glue layer), the only major reduction in aerodynamic quality (compared to the smooth model) was that the stall angle decreased to 16 degrees. The study also inquired about the hydrodynamics of Diploceraspis, which lacked a flange on the underside of the horns which was present in Diplocaulus. When the flange was removed from the smooth model, the resulting lift forces started being generated at a lower angle, 6 degrees below the horizontal rather than 1.5. This may indicate that Diploceraspis was better adapted for slower streams, where immediate lift was prioritized over the more gradual lift created by the Diplocaulus model, which would have been able to take advantage of a swifter current.

== Paleoecology ==
A trio of three juvenile Diplocaulus in a burrow of eight (plus one juvenile Eryops) were found to have been partially eaten by the sail-backed synapsid Dimetrodon, which likely unearthed the amphibians during a drought. One of the three was killed with a bite to the head, taking part of its skull and portions of the brain, a fatal injury that the animal could not defend against.

== Gallery ==
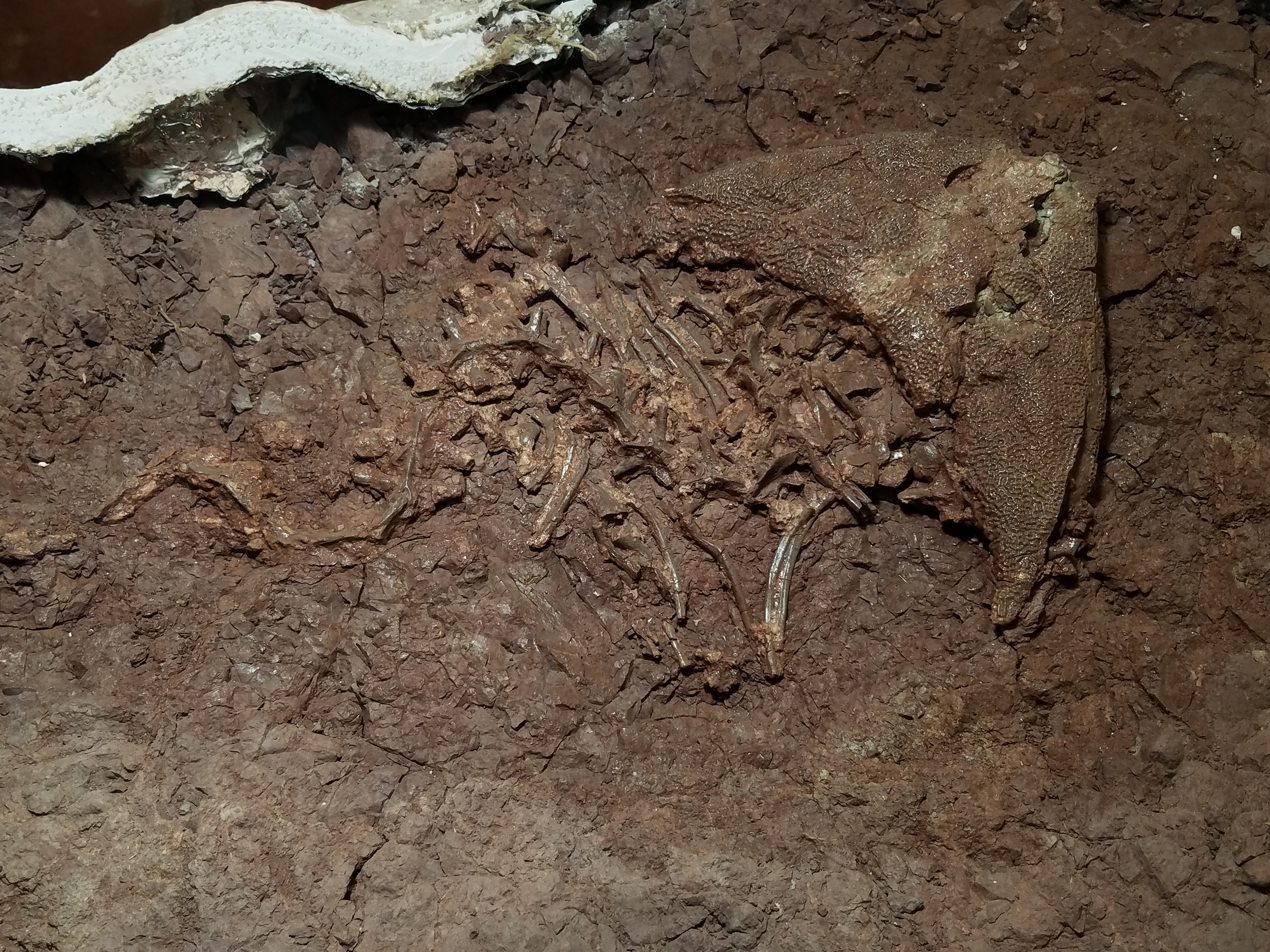
The "Sandy" specimen of Diplocaulus (WMNH)

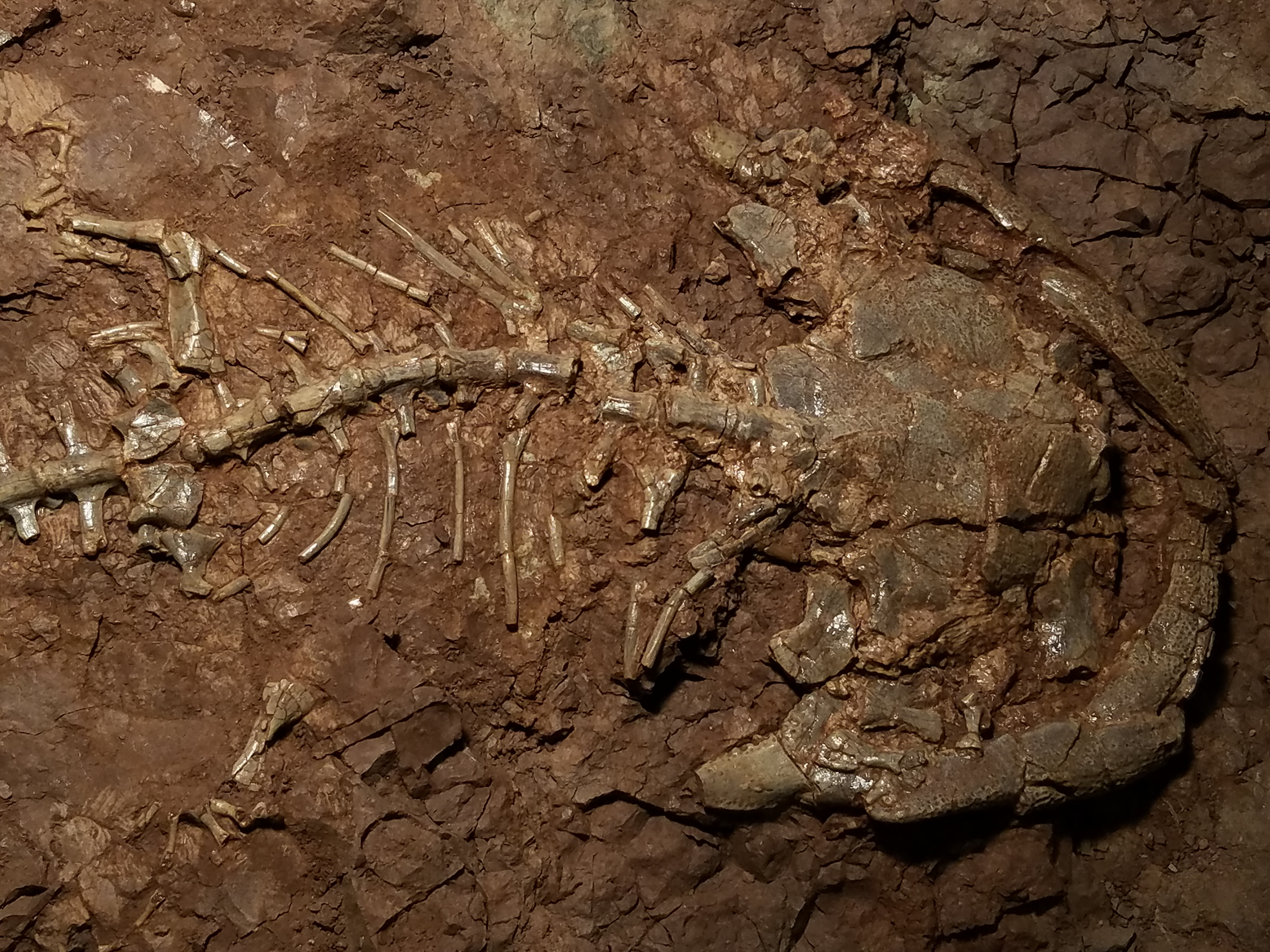
Another view of "Holly" (WMNH)

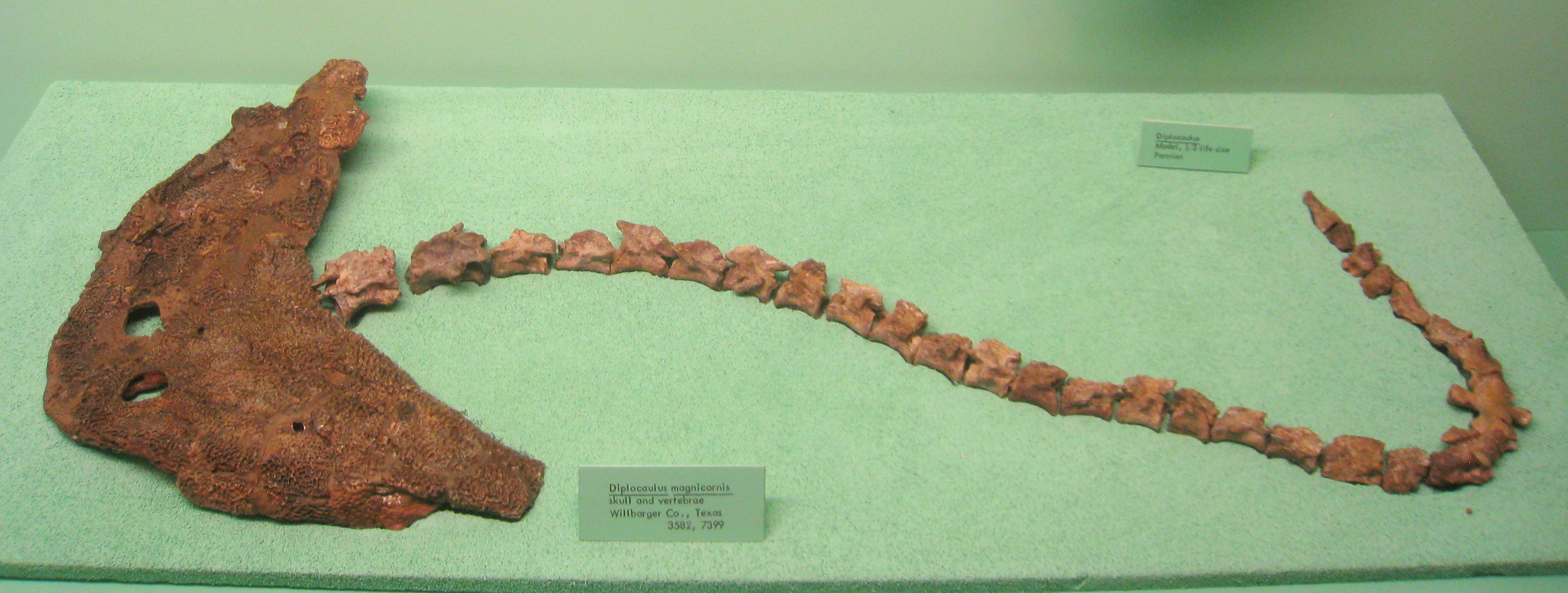
A partial skeleton of Diplocaulus magnicornis at the University of Michigan Museum of Natural History

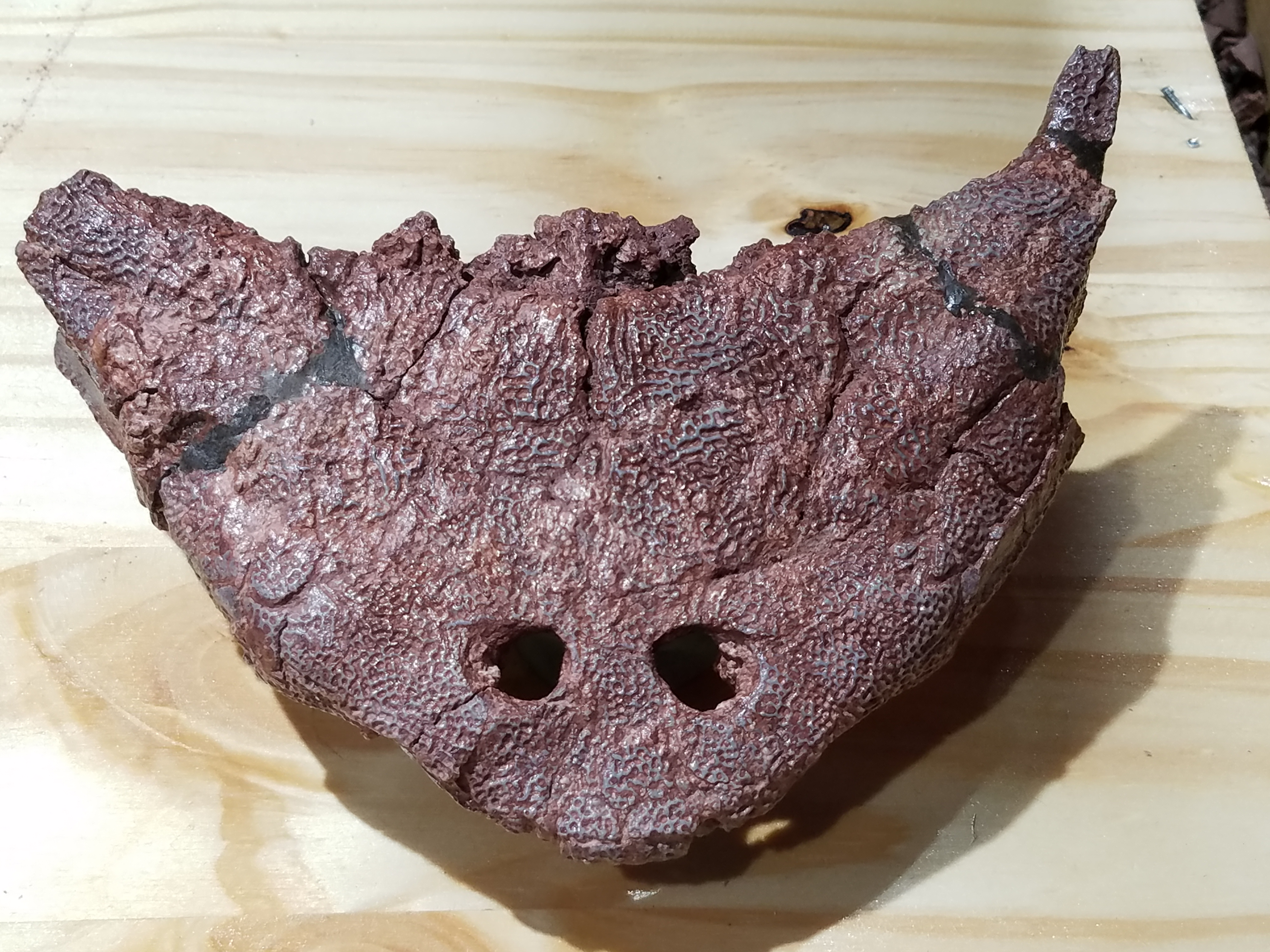
A Diplocaulus skull at the Whiteside Museum of Natural History (WMNH)

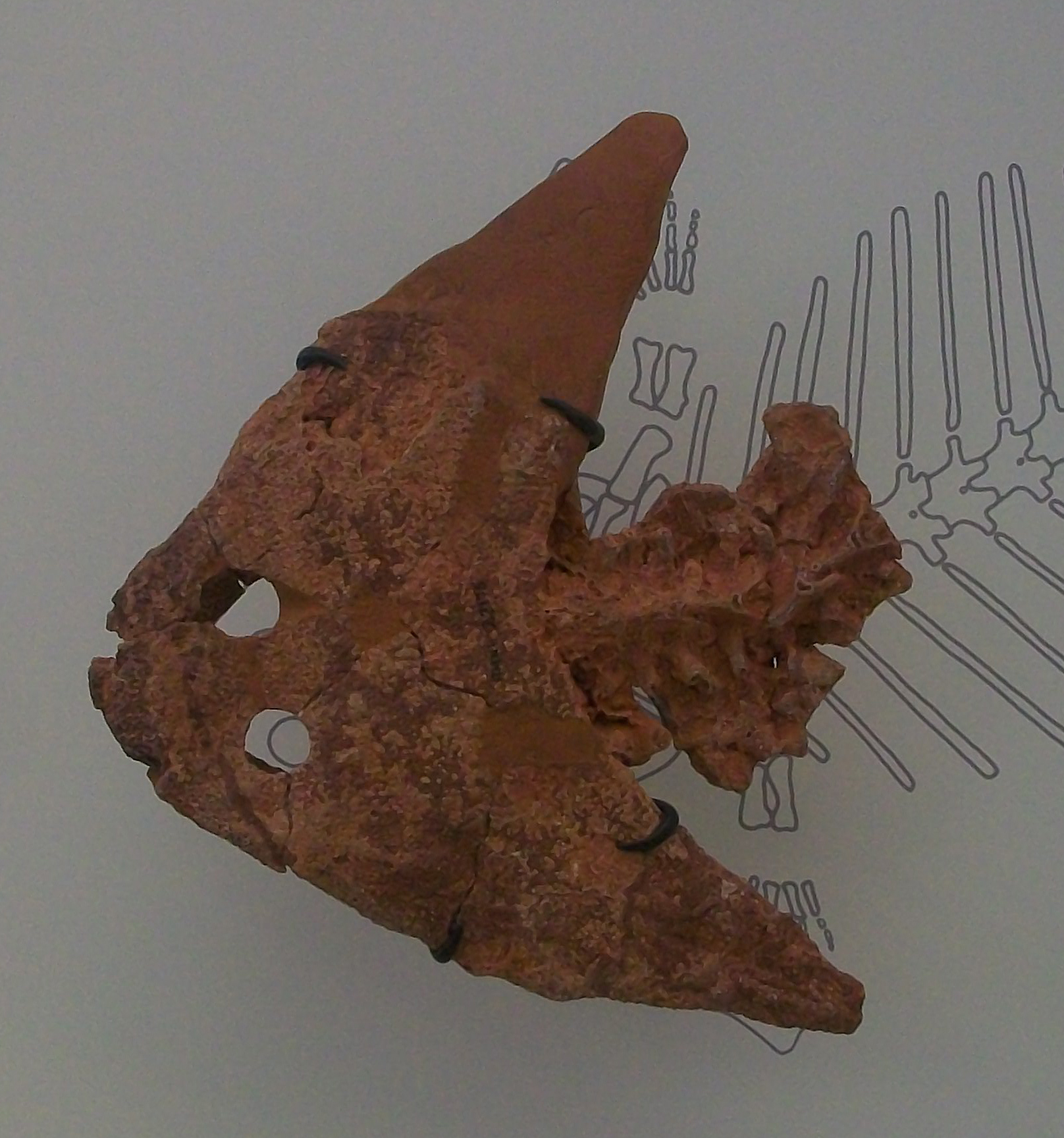
A Diplocaulus magnicornis skull at the American Museum of Natural History

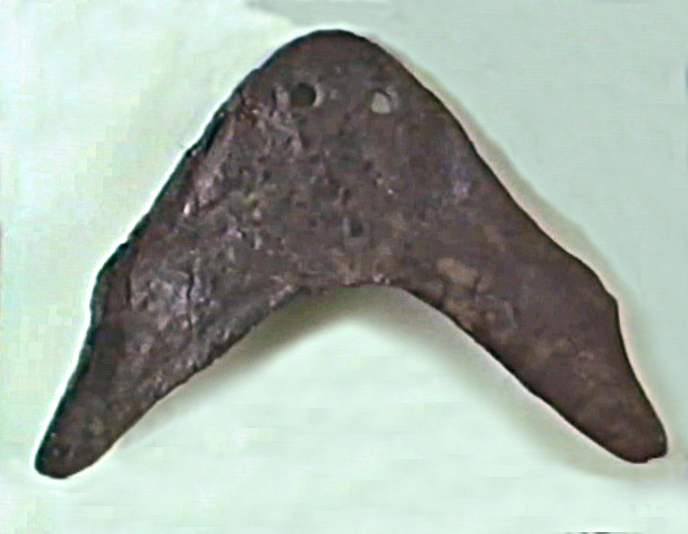
A Diplocaulus magnicornis skull at Berlin's Natural History Museum

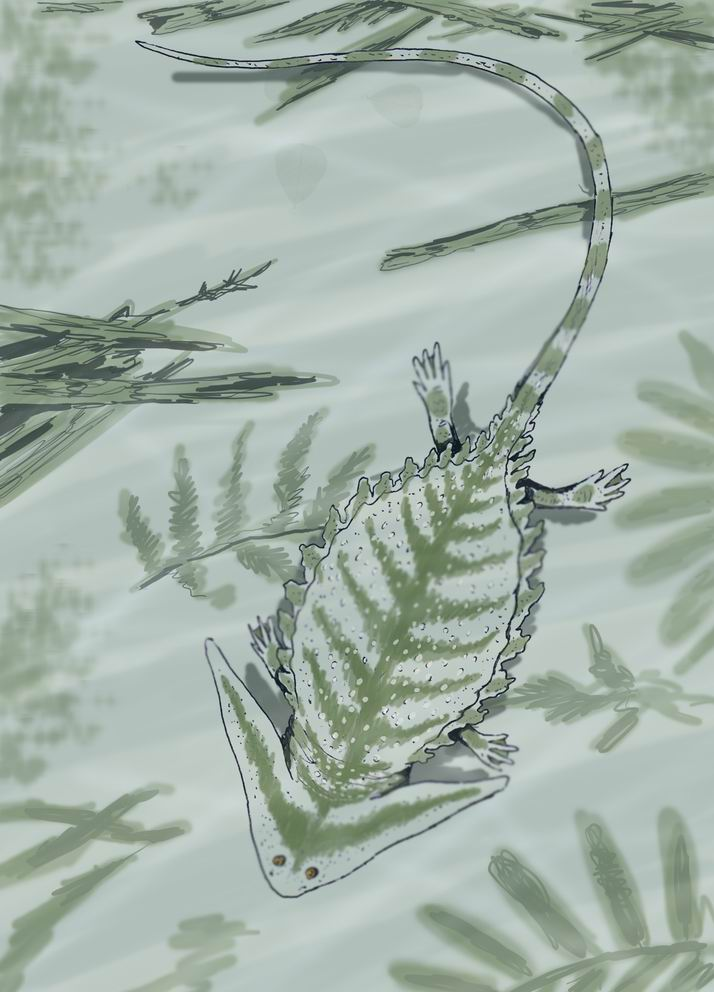
Life reconstruction of Diplocaulus, by Dimitry Bogdanov

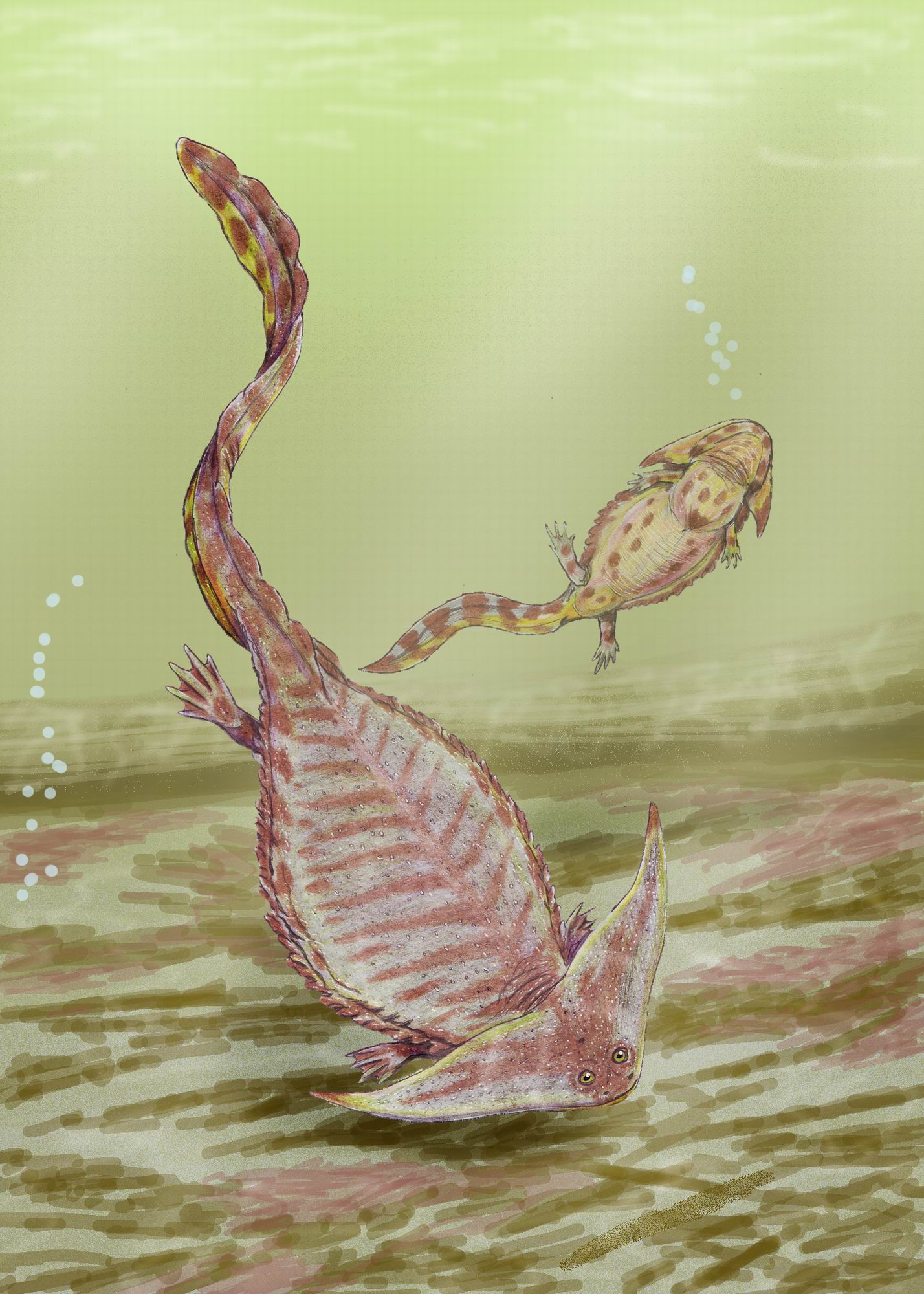
Life reconstruction of Diplocaulus, by Dimitry Bogdanov

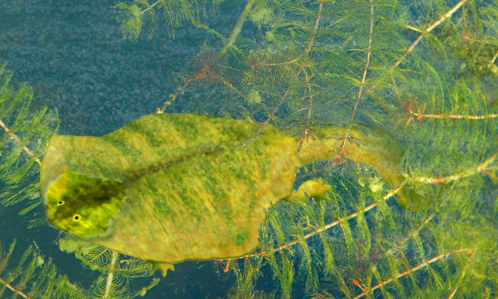
Life reconstruction of Diplocaulus with skin flaps

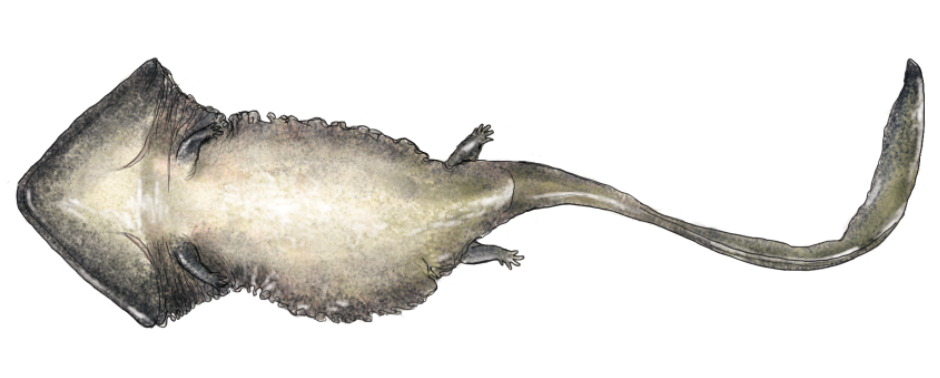
Life reconstruction of Diplocaulus with skin flaps
