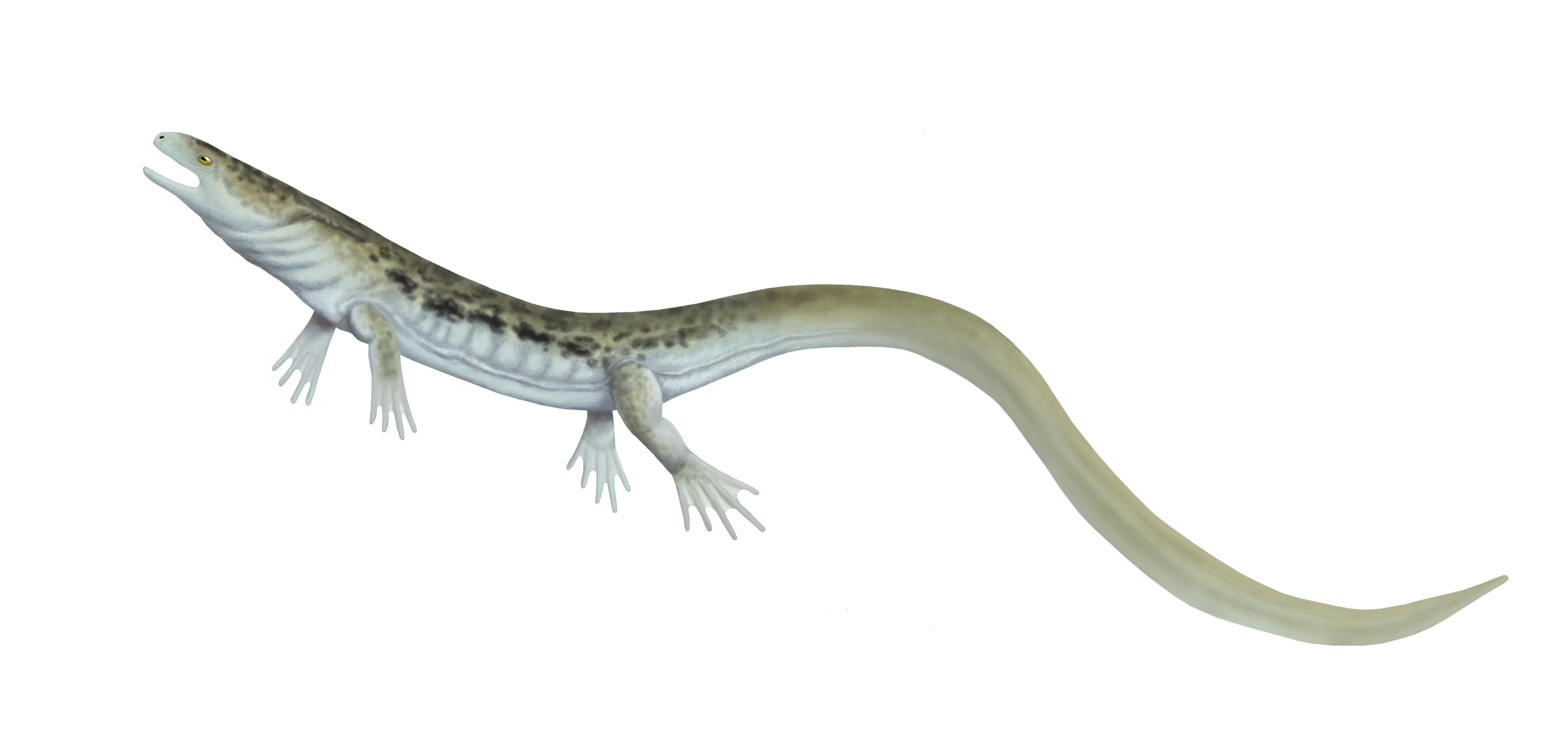

Scientific classification
- Kingdom: Animalia
- Phylum: Chordata
- Order: †Nectridea
- Family: †Diplocaulidae
- Genus: †Diceratosaurus; Jaekel, 1903

Species
- D. brevirostris (Cope, 1874)

= Diceratosaurus =

Diceratosaurus Temporal range: Late Carboniferous

Extinct genus of amphibians

Diceratosaurus is an extinct genus of nectridean tetrapodomorphs within the family Diplocaulidae. Fossils of Diceratosaurus were first described by Edward Drinker Cope in 1874. The species D. brevirostris is well known from Jefferson County, Ohio, with approximately 50 specimens having been collected from the Ohio Diamond Coal Mine. The mine was situated in the village of Linton, which became obscure soon after operations were completed and the mine closed in 1921. Diceratosaurus brevirostris dates back to the Moscovian age, 307 million years ago.
