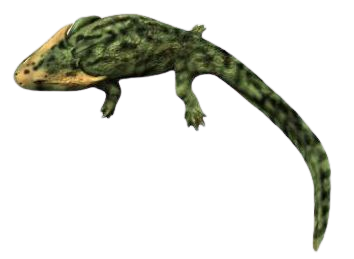
- Life restoration

Scientific classification
- Kingdom: Animalia
- Phylum: Chordata
- Order: †Nectridea
- Family: †Diplocaulidae
- Genus: †Batrachiderpeton; Hancock and Atthey, 1869

Type species
- †Batrachiderpeton reticulatum Hancock & Athey, 1869

Other species
- †Batrachiderpeton lineatum Hancock and Atthey, 1869

= Batrachiderpeton =

Batrachiderpeton Temporal range: Carboniferous, 318.1–314.6 Ma

Extinct genus of tetrapodomorphs

Batrachiderpeton is an extinct genus of nectridean tetrapodomorphs within the family Diplocaulidae; it was a basal member of the family. The type species is B. reticulatum and was found in a coal field in Northumberland, England at a locality that also yields the remains of Anthracosaurus russelli. A second species is also known: B. lineatum.
