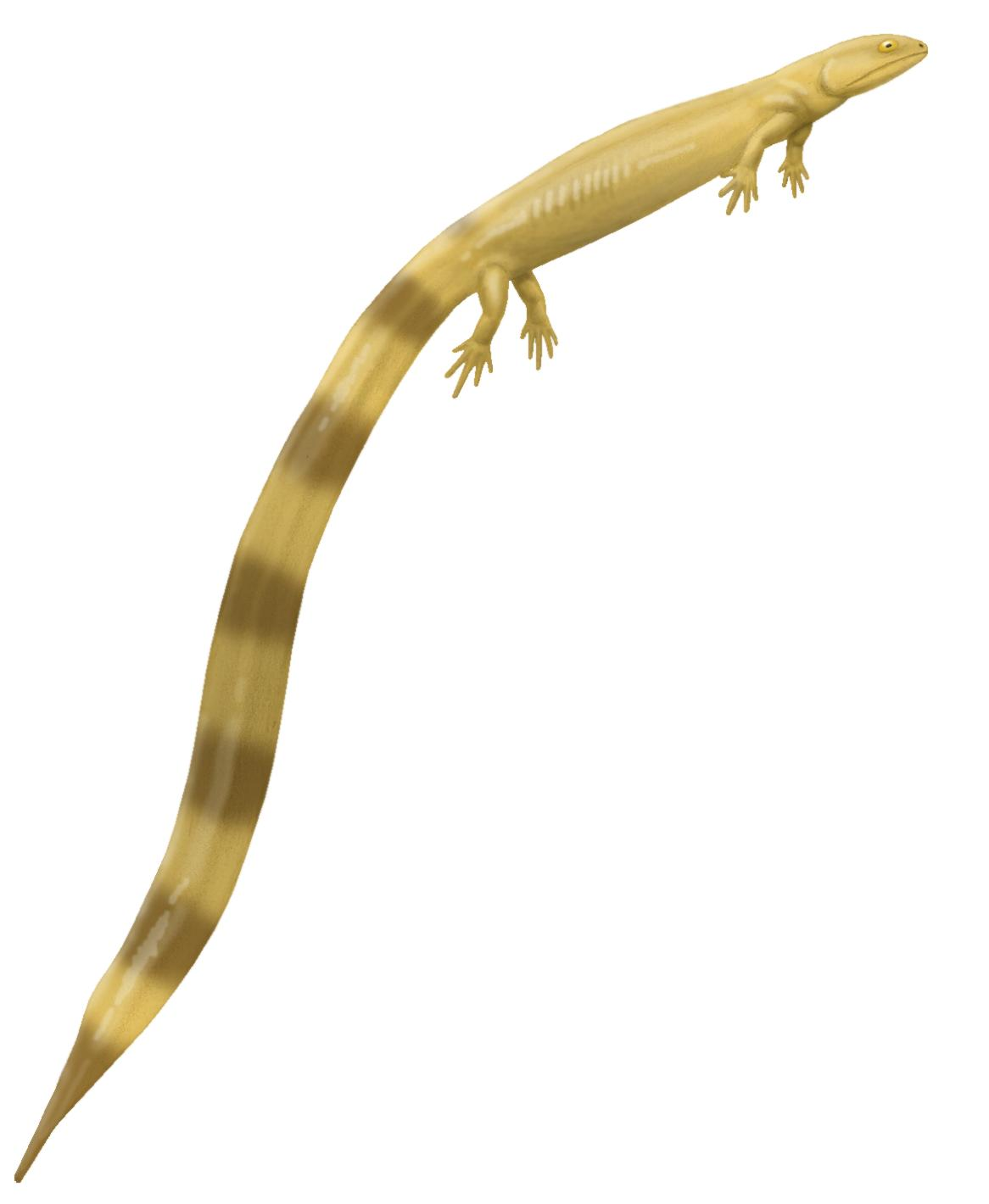

Scientific classification
- Kingdom: Animalia
- Phylum: Chordata
- Order: †Nectridea
- Family: †Urocordylidae
- Subfamily: †Urocordylinae
- Genus: †Urocordylus; Wright & Huxley, 1866

Type species
- †Urocordylus wandesfordii Huxley, 1867

Species
- †Urocordylus angustatus (Fritsch, 1883); †Urocordylus wandesfordii Huxley, 1867

= Urocordylus =

Urocordylus Temporal range: Pennsylvanian

Extinct genus of tetrapodomorphs

Urocordylus (from Greek: οὐρά oura, 'tail' and Greek: κορδῡ́λη kordū́lē, 'club') is an extinct genus of nectridean tetrapodomorphs. It is the type genus of the family Urocordylidae. Fossils have been found from Ireland that date back to the Westphalian stage of the late Carboniferous. It had total length of about 19.5 in (500 mm), but the skull was only about 1.3 in (33 mm) long.
