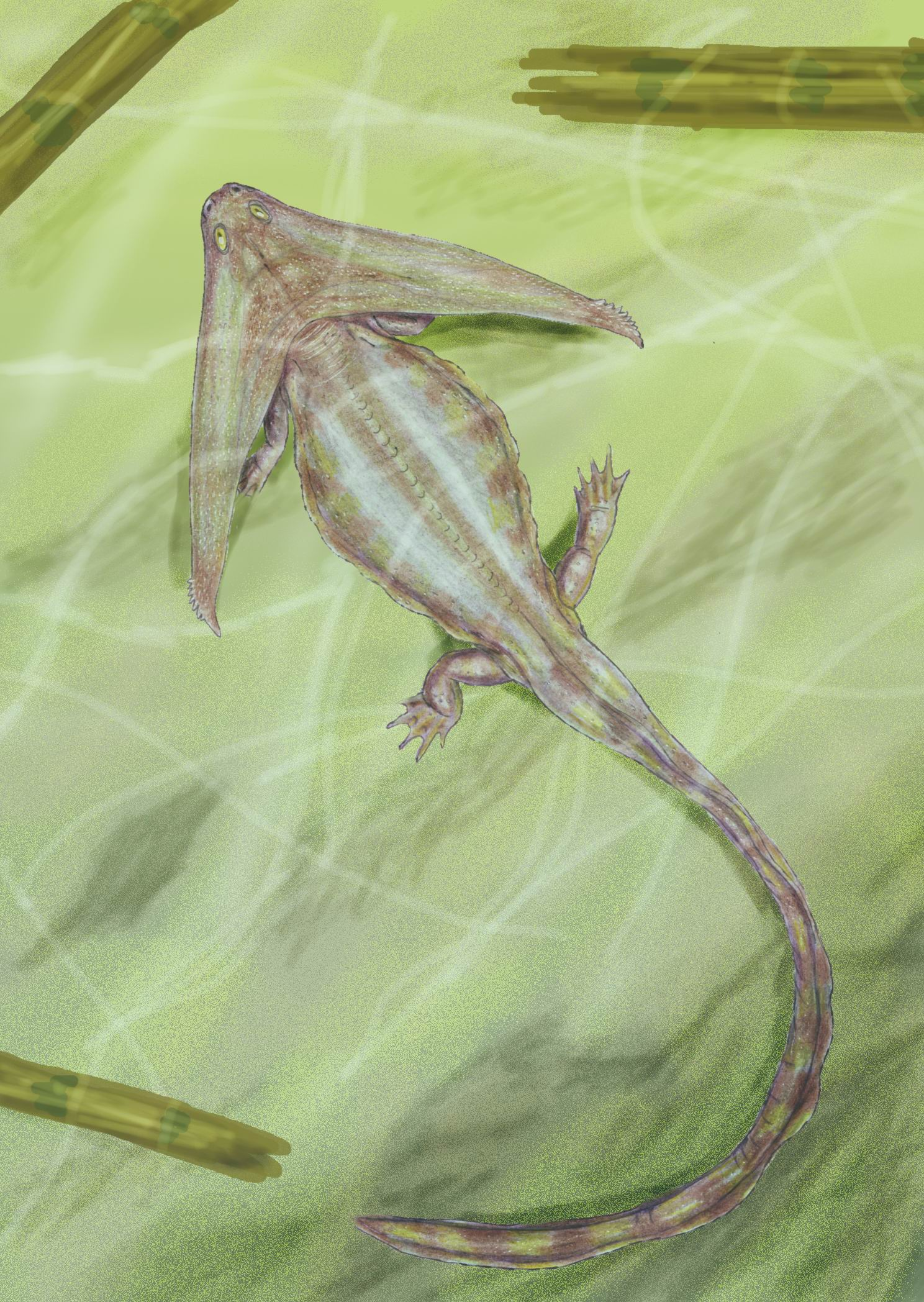

Scientific classification
- Kingdom: Animalia
- Phylum: Chordata
- Order: †Nectridea
- Family: †Diplocaulidae
- Genus: †Diploceraspis; Romer, 1952

Type species
- Diploceraspis burkei Romer, 1952

= Diploceraspis =

Diploceraspis Temporal range: Early Permian 299–270 Ma

Extinct genus of tetrapodomorphs

Diploceraspis is an extinct genus of diplocaulid nectrideans. It lived in North America during the Permian period. It closely resembles its relative, Diplocaulus. It generally sports the same features as Diplocaulus, though it was smaller, measuring over 46 cm. Beerbower originally recognised two species, D. burkei and D. conemaughensis, but they are no longer regarded as being distinct from one another as their size ranges were found to overlap. Other species include D. meritae from Nebraska and an indeterminate species from Oklahoma. Diplocaulus minimus of Late Permian Morocco may be of this genus.
