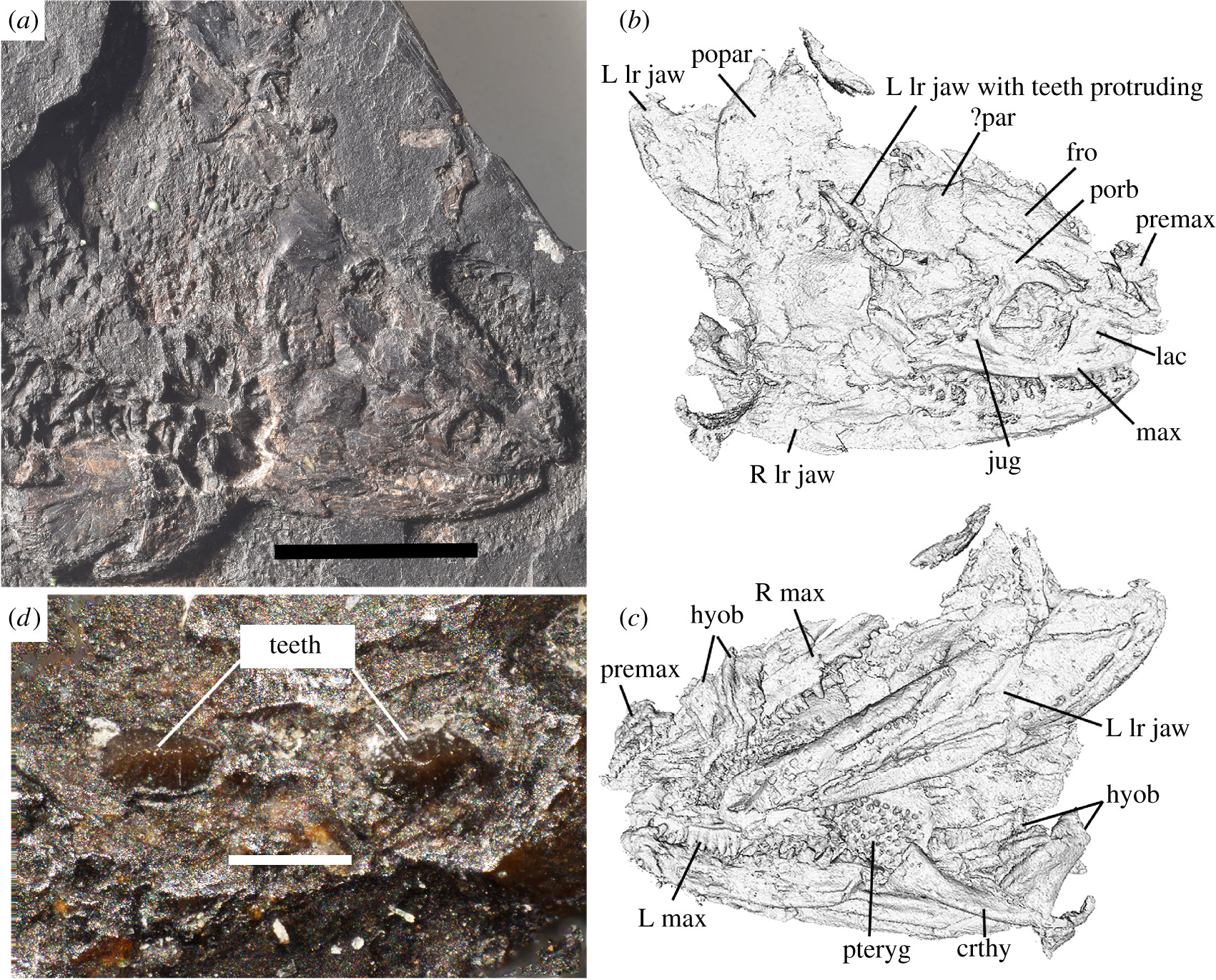
- Photographs and CT scans of the fossil

Scientific classification
- Kingdom: Animalia
- Phylum: Chordata
- Clade: Stegocephali
- Order: †Adelospondyli
- Family: †Acherontiscidae; Carroll, 1969
- Genus: †Acherontiscus; Carroll, 1969

Type species
- †Acherontiscus caledoniae Carroll, 1969

= Acherontiscus =

Acherontiscus Temporal range: Late Viséan to middle Namurian

Extinct genus of amphibians

Acherontiscus is an extinct genus of stegocephalians that lived in the Early Carboniferous (Mississippian era) of Scotland. The type and only species is Acherontiscus caledoniae, named by paleontologist Robert Carroll in 1969. Members of this genus have an unusual combination of features which makes their placement within amphibian-grade tetrapods uncertain. They possess multi-bone vertebrae similar to those of embolomeres, but also a skull similar to lepospondyls. The only known specimen of Acherontiscus possessed an elongated body similar to that of a snake or eel. No limbs were preserved, and evidence for their presence in close relatives of Acherontiscus is dubious at best. Phylogenetic analyses created by Marcello Ruta and other paleontologists in the 2000s indicate that Acherontiscus is part of Adelospondyli, closely related to other snake-like animals such as Adelogyrinus and Dolichopareias. Adelospondyls are traditionally placed within the group Lepospondyli due to their fused vertebrae (although Acherontiscus is an exception among adelospondyls). Some analyses published since 2007 have argued that adelospondyls such as Acherontiscus may not actually be lepospondyls, instead being close relatives or members of the family Colosteidae. This would indicate that they evolved prior to the split between the tetrapod lineage that leads to reptiles (Reptiliomorpha) and the one that leads to modern amphibians (Batrachomorpha). Members of this genus were probably aquatic animals that were able to swim using snake-like movements.

== Discovery ==
Acherontiscus is known only from a single skeleton, RSM 1967/13/1, which is housed at the Royal Scottish Museum in Edinburgh. Although it is known that this specimen was discovered in 1964, additional information on the location of its discovery is not known. However, the rock slab in which it was preserved is a type known as coal shale, similar to that of early Carboniferous (Mississippian)-era ironstone from Burghlee in Midlothian. The slab also includes remains of tiny crustaceans known as ostracods, as well as pollen spores. The ostracods were identified as the late Paleozoic genus Carbonita, although different scientists studying the slabs disagree on the precise species of Carbonita. The pollen spores correspond to species of plants which lived approximately between the late Viséan and middle Namurian (Serpukhovian) ages of the Carboniferous.

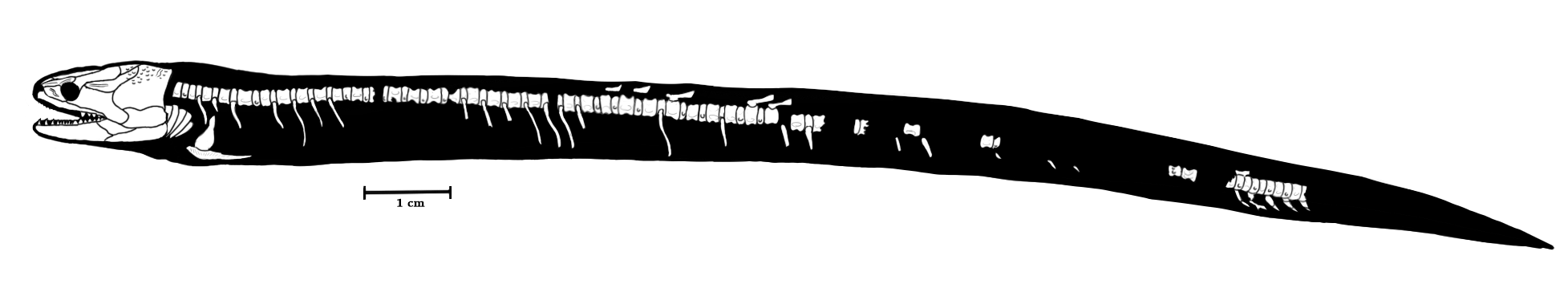
Skeletal diagram showing preserved bones of the Acherontiscus holotype. Limbs are not depicted in this interpretation.

This holotype skeleton was mostly complete, but poorly preserved. The skull was flattened and some of the surface was eroded, while the vertebrae were mostly missing, with only detailed impressions remaining. By dissolving away remaining fragments with hydrochloric acid casting these impressions in silicone rubber, the preparators of the specimen were able to more easily describe it. The specimen received a formal description and name as the species Acherontiscus caledoniae courtesy of Robert Carroll in 1969. The generic name Acherontiscus is a reference to Acheron, a river which in Greek mythology flowed into the underworld as a tributary of the river Styx. This naming convention is an homage to Edward Drinker Cope's affection for naming snake-like lepospondyls after infernal rivers, such as Phlegethontia (named after Phlegethon) and Cocytinus (named after Cocytus). The specific name, caledoniae, references Caledonia, the Latin name for Scotland.

== Description ==
Acherontiscus was serpentine in general body shape, with an elongated body and relatively small head in comparison. It may have been completely legless due to a lack of preserved limb bones. Although this hypothesis seems probable, Acherontiscus probably had limbed ancestors considering that it possessed a well-developed dermal shoulder girdle. It was small in size; the only known specimen was about 14 centimeters (5.5 inches) long. However, it may have been slightly longer considering that part of the tail is believed to be missing.

=== Skull ===
The skull is robust, with small orbits (eye holes) set towards the front of the head. Although erosion and overlap makes it difficult to distinguish individual bones of the skull, certain ones can be identified. The tip of the snout contained tiny external nares (nostril holes) preceded by premaxillary bones and followed by unusually small lacrimal and nasal bones. In order to accommodate for the small size of the nasals, the frontals and adjacent prefrontal bones are elongated, occupying the length of almost the entire upper side of the snout.

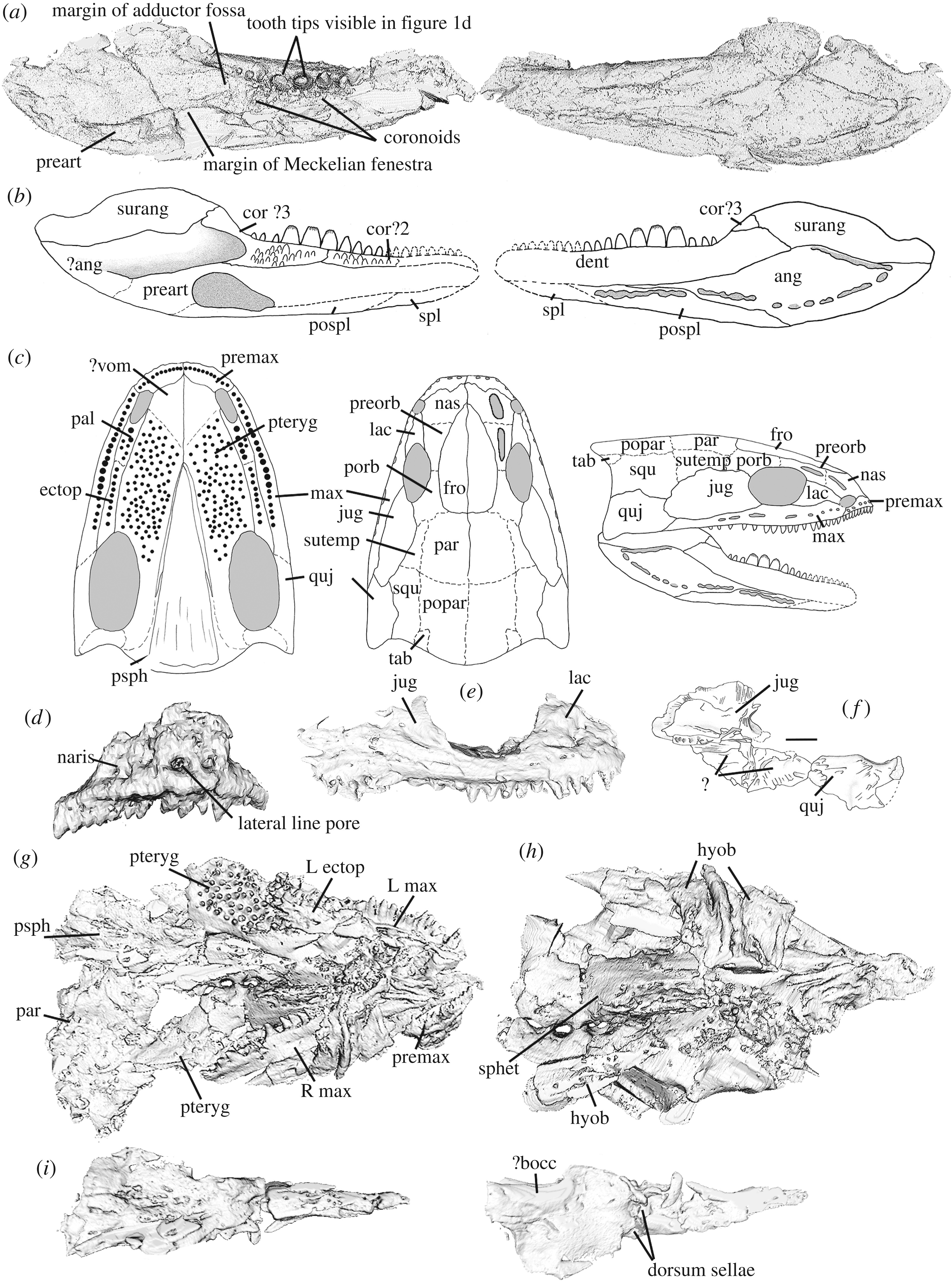
Diagrams and CT scans of the skull

The part of the skull behind the eyes is composed of several bones which were difficult to interpret due to crushing and differing hypotheses about their arrangement and naming. Perhaps the least controversial were the jugal and postorbital bones, which were found by most paleontologists who studied the specimen. Some authors, such as Carroll (1969), Carroll & Kuhn (1998), and Ruta et al. (2003) identified a postfrontal bone in front of the postorbital, but CT data from Clack et al. (2019) argued that this bone was actually the postorbital, which was followed by a supratemporal bone. Above those bones were a pair of parietals which overlooked much longer bones that reached the rear face of the skull. These bones included the squamosal and quadratojugal bones (near the jaw), and possibly one or more additional bones. The rear edge of the skull was smoothly convex, with no unusual embayments such as the otic notch of temnospondyls and other "labyrinthodonts". The bones at the rear part of the head are covered with shallow pits, while bones located further forward are smoother. Certain bones near the orbits possessed sensory grooves known as lateral lines.

The skull of Acherontiscus was generally similar to that of microsaurs such as Microbrachis and Cardiocephalus. Some have argued that this similarity is enhanced further due to how possibly only a single bone formed the temporal region of the skull (between the bones of the rear skull roof and those of the jaw area). Most other early tetrapods have two to three distinct bones in that area: the supratemporals, tabular bones, and sometimes the intertemporals. Prior to the 1970s, most studies of microsaurs often considered the single bone they retain to be the supratemporal (including in the original 1969 description of Acherontiscus). However, many studies since then identified it as the tabular bone. According to Andrews & Carroll (1991), adelospondyls possess an even more extreme reduction in the number of skull bones in this area. Their tabular bones fuse to the squamosal bones under them, creating a bone termed a 'squamosotabular'. Although the original description of Acherontiscus depicted the squamosal as separate from the tabular, Ruta et al. (2003) interpreted the skull differently. According to their interpretation, Acherontiscus also possessed the fused squamosotabular of adelogyrinids, supporting its status as an adelospondyl. A 2010 dissertation by David Marjanović claimed that the squamosotabular of adelospondyls was simply a typical squamosal bone, with the tabular being completely lost. On the other hand, Clack et al. (2019) once again found multiple bones above the squamosal in Acherontiscus, namely a large postparietal (or a pair of postparietals) edged by small tabulars.

The lower jaw was deep yet tapered towards the front, and contained at least 18 preserved teeth. Four teeth near the back of the jaw were large, blunt, and ridged, while most of the rest were much smaller. The upper jaw's teeth were smaller and more numerous, with at least 32 shared between the maxilla and premaxilla. Some teeth near the rear of the maxilla were somewhat enlarged. The differing numbers of upper and lower jaw teeth is also observed in colosteids. However, Acherontiscus' teeth lacked the maze-like internal folding of enamel which gave "labyrinthodonts" (including colosteids) their name. Bones of the hyoid apparatus have also been found near the skull.

=== Vertebrae ===
This diagram shows the distribution of different vertebrae types among various stegocephalian groups. Acherontiscus, despite being part of Stem Tetrapoda, has vertebrae resembling those of the group Embolomeri

Acherontiscus possessed an unorthodox feature compared to most lepospondyls. In most lepospondyls, each vertebra is composed of a single complex bone. However, Acherontiscus has vertebrae with multiple separate bony components. The main body (centrum) of each vertebral segment is formed by two of these bones, an intercentrum (at the front) and pleurocentrum (at the back), with an additional third bone, the plate-like neural spine, jutting out of the top of each intercentrum. This condition was much more similar to that of embolomeres than lepospondyls. More than 32 composite vertebrae were preserved. Extrapolating from missing chunks of the spine, it was likely that Acherontiscus had up to 64 vertebrae in total.

The intercentra and pleurocentra are similar in size and shape, with the pleurocentra being slightly longer rostrocaudally (in the head-to-tail orientation) in most situations. The intercentra also have facets which would have connected to double-headed ribs. The first few neck vertebrae are presumably missing, making it impossible to determine the exact nature of the skull joint. The first preserved vertebra is a relative short pleurocentrum, rather than a complex skull joint vertebra such as an atlas or axis. The rest of the vertebrae in the neck area are crescent-shaped and tube-like, although by the 5th preserved vertebrae at least the pleurocentra have transitioned into enclosed cylinders, each perforated by a hole for the spinal cord. The intercentra transitioned more slowly, as no intercentra between the 6th (which was crescent-shaped) and the 25th (cylindrical) vertebrae were visible from the front. Neural spines preserved from the hip region (around vertebra 30) are low and set far back on their respective vertebrae, although they are also preserved displaced from them. This indicates that they were also separate bones from the intercentra and pleurocentra. The centra elements are covered with a small number of large and deep pits, although in the tail region (around vertebra 40) these pits become shallower. The two centra elements also become basically equal in size in this part of the spine. The few tail vertebrae that are preserved also possess haemal arches, loosely attached spiny structures jutting out the bottom of the intercentra.

=== Other bones ===
No bones of either the front or hind limbs were preserved in the holotype of Acherontiscus. In addition, bones of the endochondral shoulder girdle (i.e. the scapulae and coracoids) are also missing. However, a well-developed dermal shoulder girdle (consisting of clavicles and an interclavicle) is preserved, indicating that the ancestors of Acherontiscus possessed forelimbs. In 1969 Carroll considered it unlikely that Acherontiscus would not have possessed limbs considering the size of the shoulder girdle, with the missing bones perhaps becoming misplaced through the processes by which the animal died and became fossilized. However, by 1998 he considered it equally plausible that the animal was completely legless, with the dermal girdle retained as a relic of an earlier ancestor. The dermal shoulder girdle is represented by a plate-like interclavicle (which would have been at the center of a living animal's chest) as well as two clavicle bones branching up from it. The simple and oval-shaped interclavicle is bisected by a low ridge and covered in grooves. The clavicle bones are thick and rounded at their base but taper as they extend outwards (and upwards in the case of a living animal).

No conclusive evidence of a pelvic girdle or hindlimbs have been found, although Carroll (1969) considered that a few bone fragments around the 26th to 31st vertebrae may have been leg bones. As a whole, the lack of known limb and endochondral material yet the retention of a dermal shoulder girdle is a condition similar to that of the other family of adelospondyls, the adelogyrinids. Although forelimbs were supposedly found in various adelogyrinids in the late 1960s, Andrews & Carroll (1991) found that all cases of forelimb bones in adelogyrinids were actually misinterpretations. For example, putative forelimbs discovered in Adelogyrinus and Palaeomolgophis by Brough & Brough (1967) were respectively re-identified as hyoid bones and ribs. Carroll (1967) also claimed that forelimbs were present in Adelospondylus, but these were found to be hyoids as in Adelogyrinus. A few small, elongated scales have been preserved among the bones of the Acherontiscus skeleton. These scales show some similarities to those of microsaurs, but also towards other tetrapods such as the dvinosaurian temnospondyl Trimerorhachis.

== Classification ==
=== Taxonomic uncertainty ===
The classification of Acherontiscus has gone through much revision in the past, as it shows a mixture of characteristics from various groups of non-amniote tetrapods (amphibians in the broad definition of the term). Traditionally, ancient amphibians have been classified into two groups: labyrinthodonts and lepospondyls. Labyrinthodonts can be characterized by their maze-like tooth enamel, the presence of multiple bones forming each vertebral segment, and a generally crocodile-like appearance. Modern analyses have concluded that the order "Labyrinthodontia" is composed of various groups of non-amniote stegocephalians scattered within and near the tetrapod family tree. Such groups include stem-tetrapods such as Ichthyostega, as well as the diverse groups Embolomeri and Temnospondyli, the latter of which probably including modern lissamphibians such as frogs and salamanders. Lepospondyls, on the other hand, generally had single-bone vertebrae and often possessed long bodies and reduced (or even absent) limbs.

Between 1969 and 2003, many paleontologists could not place Acherontiscus into any group with absolute certainty. In some ways Acherontiscus resembled lepospondyls. For example, its eel-like and potentially legless body was similar to members of the groups Lysorophia, Aïstopoda, and Adelospondyli, while its skull and teeth closely resembled those of several microsaurs such as Microbrachis. However, the presence of multiple bones of near-equal size composing each vertebra was more similar to the condition in labyrinthodonts, specifically members of the group Embolomeri. Carroll's 1969 description of Acherontiscus refused to place the genus into a particular subclass and order.

Since then, some additional information has assisted classification of Acherontiscus. A review of microsaurs by Carroll and Gaskill in 1978 found that the genus did not have enough specific features to justify inclusion in that group. For example, Acherontiscus possesses lateral line canals (which are unknown in microsaurs), and did not preserve (or possess) the characteristic atlas bone of microsaurs. Similarly, Wellstead's 1991 review of lysorophians rejected any placement of Acherontiscus within the group, as its skull and pectoral girdle were quite different from the condition in lysorophians, which had highly modified skulls and practically no bony elements in their shoulder region.

=== Ruta et al. (2003): Acherontiscus as an adelospondyl (within Lepospondyli) ===
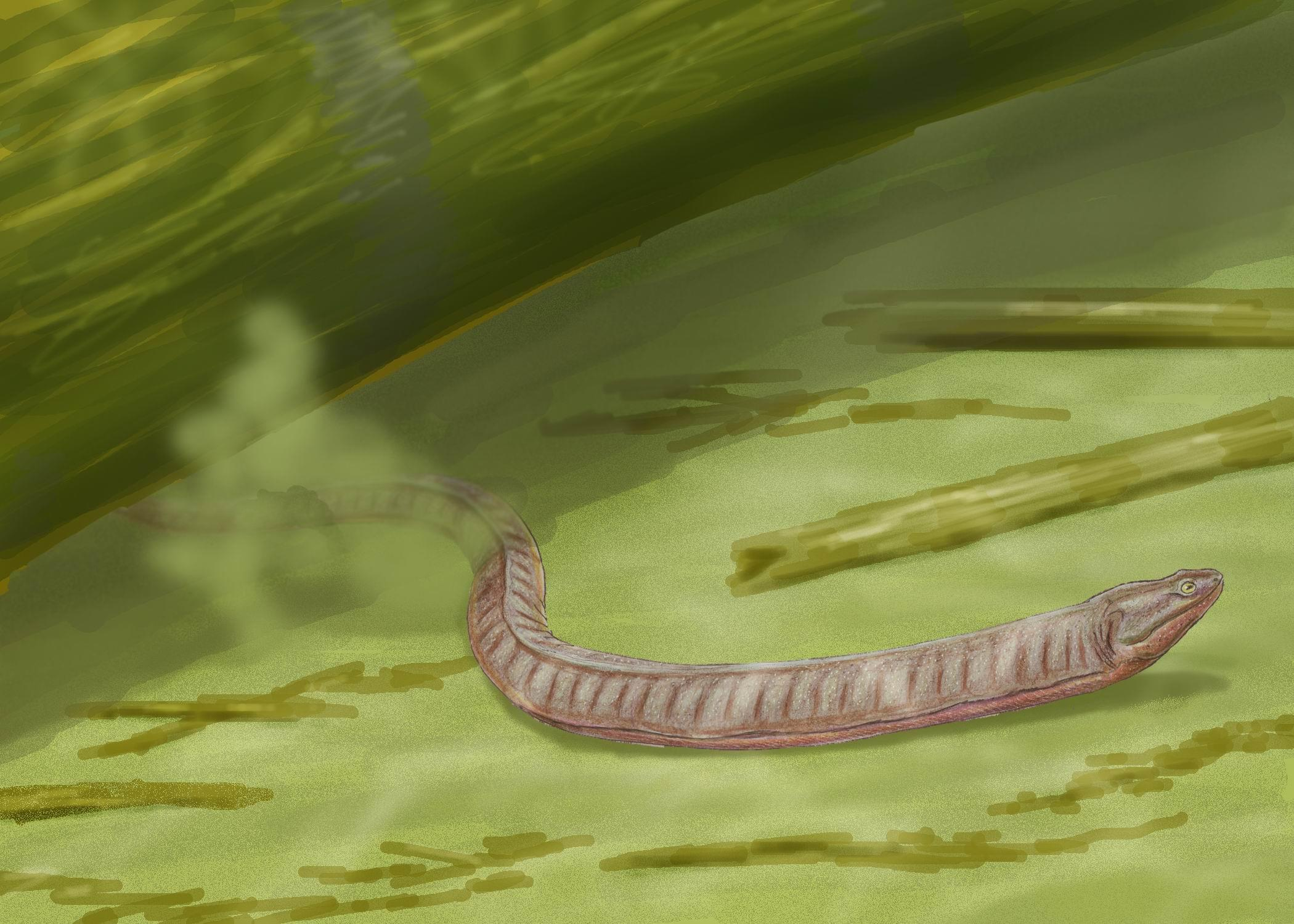
Acherontiscus is a close relative of adelogyrinids such as this genus, Adelospondylus. Ruta et al. (2003) considers Acherontiscus and adelogyrinids to be members of the group Lepospondyli

Acherontiscus was finally placed in a specific broader group by Ruta et al. (2003)'s study on early tetrapods. They argued that the Acherontiscus specimen was a young or neotenic member of the group Adelospondyli. The authors of this study re-examined the specimen, providing new interpretations of the crushed skull bones, such as the presence of a squamosotabular and a postorbital which did not contact the orbit. The short nasal bones, long frontal bones, presence of lateral lines, and eyes set far forward on the skull were combined with the new interpretations to construct Acherontiscus as having a skull very similar to that of adelospondyls. The snake-like body, highly reduced or absent limbs, and large pectoral girdle were also general features supporting the placement of Acherontiscus among the adelospondyls.

The only feature with the potential to endanger this classification is the embolomere-like vertebrae of Acherontiscus, which contrast with the vertebrae of adelogyrinids (with only a single main bone in the centra). However, new data has shown that several other early lepospondyls did not possess single-bone vertebrae. For example, the early aïstopod Lethiscus still retained separate intercentra and pleurocentra, and a few early microsaurs such as Trihecaton possessed small intercentra to complement their large pleurocentra. Lepospondyls are typically grouped together based on their single-bone (lepospondylous) vertebrae, but the fact that many lepospondyl groups evolved these vertebrae independently casts doubt onto the validity of the group. Animals like Acherontiscus, Lethiscus, and Trihecaton show that Lepospondyli, rather than being a traditional monophyletic group with a single ancestor, may in fact be a polyphyletic collection of unrelated tetrapods and stem-tetrapods, with different groups having ancestry in different locations on the stegocephalian family tree. Vallin & Laurin (2004) considered adelospondyls to be closely related to aïstopods due to their similar body types and the fact that they are among the oldest known lepospondyls. However, this study did not feature or discuss Acherontiscus.

The following cladogram is a portion of the strict consensus tree of Ruta et al. (2003), showing Lepospondyli as monophyletic and Acherontiscus as a member of Adelospondyli. The strict consensus tree of this analysis is the average result of 64 most parsimonious trees (MPT). An MPT is a family tree with the fewest possible number of evolutionary 'steps' where sampled anatomical traits are acquired, lost, and reacquired. Under the principle of Occam's razor, an MPT is the most accurate family tree as it assumes that evolutionary paths are not more complex than they need to be. When more than one MPT is found by the phylogenetic software (for example, this study has 64, each at 1375 steps), a strict consensus tree has to be created. A strict consensus tree is a compromise between MPTs which retains the broad shape of every MPT while not being specific enough to closely resemble a single one. This lack of specificity can sometimes result in a polytomy, where a branch of taxa are collapsed into a multi-pronged group due to MPTs disagreeing on the group's structure.

- Lepospondyli
  - - - Batropetes
      - - Tuditanus
        - - - Pantylus
            - Stegotretus
          - - Asaphestera
            - - Saxonerpeton
              - - Hapsidopareion
                - - - Micraroter
                    - Pelodosotis
                  - - Rhynchonkos
                    - - Cardiocephalus
                      - Euryodus
  - - - Microbrachis
      - - Hyloplesion
        - Odonterpeton
    - - Lysorophia
        - Brachydectes
      - - Adelospondyli
          - Acherontiscidae
            - Acherontiscus
          - Adelogyrinidae
            - Adelospondylus
            - - Adelogyrinus
              - Dolichopareias
        - Holospondyli
          - - Scincosauridae
            - Diplocaulidae
          - - Urocordylidae
            - Aistopoda

=== Hook (1983), Ruta & Coates (2007): Acherontiscus as an adelospondyl (near Colosteidae) ===
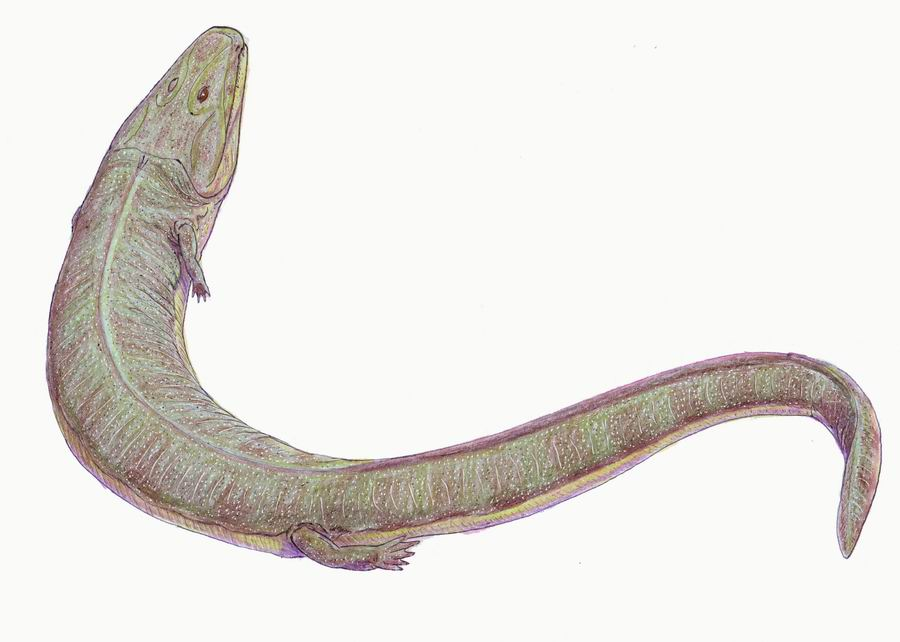
Under the hypotheses of Hook (1983) and Ruta & Coates (2007), Acherontiscus (and adelogyrinids) are stem-tetrapods related to colosteids such as this genus, Greererpeton

If Lepospondyli is indeed polyphyletic, then its constituents must find new locations on the family tree of stegocephalians. Although every MPT from Ruta et al. (2003) found adelospondyls (including Acherontiscus) to be within a monophyletic Lepospondyli, several other family trees found by the analysis offered an alternate position. A tree 1380 steps long (only 5 steps longer than the MPTs) placed adelospondyls far away from other lepospondyls, instead placing them as the sister group to colosteids, a group of long-bodied stem-tetrapods only slightly more advanced than Icthyostega-grade stegocephalians. Studies on data distribution within this alternate result indicate that it was only barely inferior to the traditional position of adelospondyls within Lepospondyli. This result intrigued the authors, and a follow-up review by Ruta & Coates in 2007 found that adelospondyls were close to colosteids even in their MPTs, indicating that this position was significantly more likely than a position within Lepospondyli.

These studies were not the first to suggest a close relation between Acherontiscus and Colosteidae. In 1983, Robert Hook observed several shared characteristics between adelospondyls and colsteids in his redescription of Colosteus. He noted that both colosteids and adelospondyls possessed a prefrontal bone which contacted the front edge of the orbit, and a postorbital bone which contacted the parietal near the back of the head. In addition, he noted that both groups combined traditionally "labyrinthodont" features (such as the presence of lateral lines) with "lepospondyl" features (such as the lack of otic notches). However, Hook's hypothesis did not receive further discussion until Ruta et al. (2003) and Ruta & Coates (2007). Phylogenetic studies performed since Ruta & Coates (2007) have generally supported this hypothesis.

The following cladogram is the strict consensus tree of 9 MPTs found in the reweighted analysis of Ruta & Coates (2007). The reweighted analysis is similar to a typical phylogenetic analysis, but certain transitions involve different numbers of steps due to different evolutionary traits being weighted. The weighting of traits relates to how consistent the traits appear among the tetrapod family tree. Traits which are prone to being convergently evolved are emphasized less during "steps" in the family trees, while traits that are unique to only a few groups are emphasized more:

- Stegocephalia
  - Ventastega
  - - Acanthostega
    - - Ichthyostega
      - - Ossinodus
        - - Tulerpeton
          - - Whatcheeriidae
            - - Crassigyrinus
              - - - Colosteidae
                    - Colosteus
                    - Greererpeton
                  - Adelospondyli
                    - Acherontiscidae
                      Acherontiscus
                    - Adelogyrinidae
                      - Adelogyrinus
                      - Adelospondylus
                      - Dolichopareias
                - - Baphetoidea
                  - Crown-Tetrapoda
                    - Batrachomorpha
                      Temnospondyli (including Lissamphibia)
                    - Reptiliomorpha
                      - Caerorhachis
                      - - - Silvanerpeton
                          - Embolomeri
                        - - Gephyrostegus
                          - - Bruktererpeton
                            - - - Utegenia
                                - - Discosauriscus
                                  - - Ariekanerpeton
                                    - - Leptoropha
                                      - Microphon
                              - - Seymouria
                                - - Kotlassia
                                  - - Solenodonsaurus
                                    - - Diadectomorpha (including Amniota)
                                      - - Westlothiana
                                        - Lepospondyli

One particular study which heavily discussed the relations of Acherontiscus and other adelospondyls was a 2016 study on how time sampling can alter phylogenetic trees. This study, Bernardi et al. (2016), noted that specializations in advanced amphibians may pollute the relations of more basal taxa when all of them are placed in a single phylogenetic analysis. In order to test this possibility, the study separated prehistoric stegocephalians into five groups depending on their age: Devonian (D), Mississippian (M), Pennsylvanian (P), Permian (R), and Mesozoic (Z). Acherontiscus and other adelospondyls were placed within the "M" group. Next, the study constructed five separate datasets focusing on taxa from each group, as well as four more datasets which progressively incorporated more groups (from "D+M" to "D+M+P+R+Z"). Each of these nine datasets was an altered version of the dataset used by Ruta & Coates (2007), except with certain parameters changed and traits only being scored if they were informative to the relations of any taxa within each dataset. These nine datasets were termed "re-analyzed trees"

In addition, Bernardi et al. (2016) used the Ruta & Coates (2007) dataset to construct another group of datasets. However, these additional datasets (termed "pruned trees") did not undergo the changed parameters and traits of the "re-analyzed trees". Instead, they followed exactly the same methods as Ruta & Coates (2007), with the only difference being that taxa were excluded ("pruned") based on time period. The "pruned trees" used the same nine grouping protocol as the "re-analyzed trees".

When this eighteen-part analysis was finally undertaken, a few interesting results were gathered. Acherontiscus and the other adelospondyls were found to be close to the colosteids in almost all of the sets they were included in. However, a few sets had different results. The "D+M re-analyzed tree" also included Lethiscus among the adelospondyls and colosteids, rather than the aïstopods as usually believed. The "D+M+P re-analyzed tree" placed adelospondyls away from colosteids, instead back with lepospondyls as previous hypotheses have argued for. However, this was the only set which included this result. The seventeen other sets used in this analysis agreed that adelospondyls were stem-tetrapods close to Colosteidae.

Nevertheless, this reinterpretation is not supported by every analysis since Ruta & Coates (2007). Marjanovic & Laurin (2019) revised some scores and methodology used by Ruta & Coates (2007), including removing their reweighting protocol. They found that Acherontiscus and the rest of the adelospondyls shifted back into a monophyletic Lepospondyli, where they were usually positioned near urocordylids and aistopods. Clack et al. (2019) found an unusual combination of both of these hypotheses, by placing Acherontiscus and other adelospondyls as stem-tetrapods in a clade also containing colosteids, urocordylids, aistopods (which have recently been reconsider as stem-tetrapods too), and occasionally Tulerpeton. Their result also placed the recently discovered stem-tetrapod Aytonerpeton within Adelospondyli as the sister taxon to Acherontiscus.

== Paleobiology ==
Due to the presence of lateral lines, Acherontiscus individuals are inferred to be aquatic animals. Carroll (1969) also noted that even if limbs were present in life, their lack of preservation would indicate that they had very little bone material. This also supports the hypothesis that Acherontiscus lived practically their entire lives in water. The long body and embolomerous vertebrae would have facilitated side-to-side "snake-like" swimming. As with other adelospondyls, the large hyoid apparatus of Acherontiscus suggest that they possessed gills, although such gills were probably internal like those of fish rather than external like those of neotenic salamanders.

Noting the large, blunt, and ridged teeth of the lower jaw, Clack et al. (2019) argued that Acherontiscus was durophagous, meaning that it fed on hard-shelled invertebrates. Some of its prey items could have included aquatic molluscs and crustaceans, especially ostracods, which were common in the rock slab which preserved the specimen. The deep jaw also supports this hypothesis since it would have given Acherontiscus a strong bite. Acherontiscus is the oldest known tetrapod with heterodont dentition (i.e. teeth of different shapes and sizes), predating the next oldest (the Early Permian captorhinid Opisthodontosaurus) by about 50 million years.

== See also ==
- Prehistoric amphibian
- List of prehistoric amphibians
