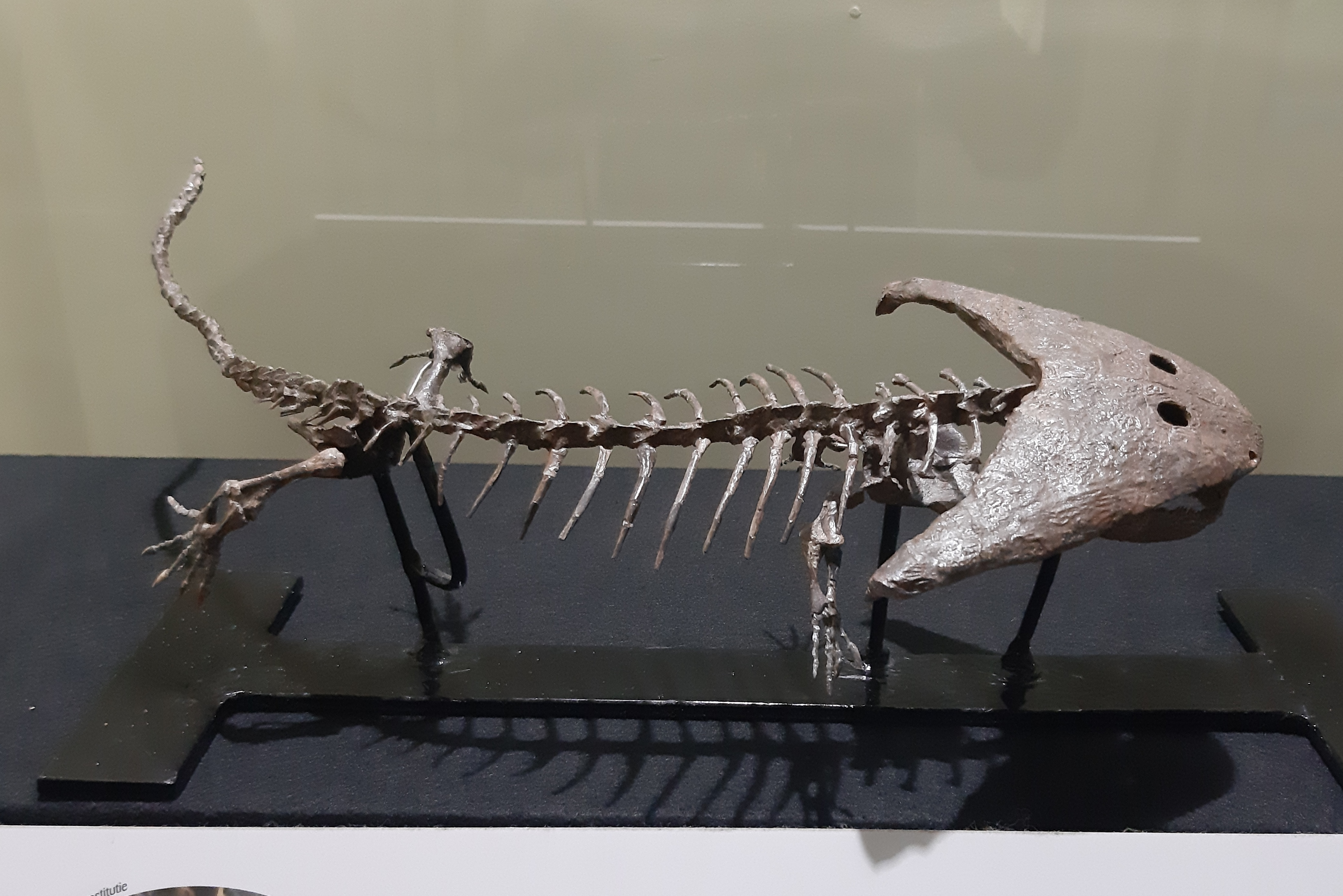
- Diplocaulus, a diplocaulid "nectridean"

Scientific classification
- Kingdom: Animalia
- Phylum: Chordata
- Clade: Stegocephali
- Clade: †Lepospondyli; Zittel, 1888

Groups
- †"Microsauria"; †Lysorophia; Proposed clade Holospondyli; †Nectridea; †Aïstopoda?; †Adelospondyli?; Gymnophiona?

= Lepospondyli =

Lepospondyls Temporal range: Visean–Lopingian Possible descendant taxon Lissamphibia survives to present

Polyphyletic group of tetrapodomorphs

Lepospondyli is a grouping of five early tetrapod orders from the Carboniferous and Permian periods: the newt-like nectrideans, legless aistopods and adelospondyls, nearly-legless lysorophians, and burrowing or lizard-like microsaurs. These various tetrapod groups were historically distinguished from "labyrinthodonts" (another traditional grouping of Paleozoic tetrapods) by their smaller size, single-part vertebrae, lack of palatal fangs, and simpler tooth structure. Various species were aquatic, semiaquatic, or terrestrial. The most famous lepospondyl is Diplocaulus, a nectridean with a boomerang-shaped skull. It also qualifies as the largest, most widespread, and last surviving member of Lepospondyli.

Many phylogenetic analyses regard Lepospondyli as a polyphyletic grouping, with no close relationships between its constituents as a whole. Aistopods and adelospondyls are often found to be stem-tetrapods (evolving prior to the common ancestor of modern amphibians and amniotes). Lyrosorphians are subsumed within the recumbirostran microsaurs, which are often recovered as stem-amniotes. Nectrideans are more ambiguous in classification, though at least one study has positioned the diplocaulids as a family of temnospondyls.

With the exception of one late-surviving lepospondyl from the Late Permian of Morocco (Diplocaulus minimus), lepospondyls lived from the Visean stage of the Early Carboniferous to the Early Permian and were geographically restricted to what is now Europe and North America. None were large (Diplocaulus could reach a meter in length, but most were much smaller), and they are assumed to have lived in specialized ecological niches not taken by larger or more numerous predatory amphibians, such as embolomeres and temnospondyls, which coexisted with them in the Paleozoic. Lepospondyli was named in 1888 by Karl Alfred von Zittel, who coined the name to include some tetrapods from the Paleozoic that shared some specific characteristics in the notochord and teeth.

A small group of paleontologists consider at least some lepospondyls to be closely related or ancestral to modern amphibians (the so-called "Lepospondyl hypothesis"). This is a minority opinion, and nearly all other specialists consider modern amphibians to be descended from temnospondyls instead. Another less controversial proposal is that some lepospondyls are amphibians on the lineage leading to Amniota (the clade containing reptiles and mammals).

== Description ==
All lepospondyls are characterised by having simple, spool-shaped vertebrae that supposedly did not ossify from cartilage, but rather grew as bony cylinders around the notochord, although this has been shown not to be true: the vertebrae of many lepospondyls did, in fact, develop from cartilaginous precursors similar to stereospondylous temnospondyls. In addition, the upper portion of the vertebra, the neural arch, is usually fused to the centrum (the main body of the vertebra).

== Classification ==
The position of the Lepospondyli within the Tetrapoda is uncertain because the earliest lepospondyls were already highly specialized when they first appeared in the fossil record. Some lepospondyls were once thought to be related or perhaps ancestral to modern salamanders (Urodela), but not the other modern amphibians. This view is no longer held and all modern amphibians (frogs, salamanders, and caecilians) are now grouped within the clade Lissamphibia. For a long time, the Lepospondyli were considered one of the three subclasses of Amphibia, along with the Lissamphibia and the Labyrinthodontia. However, the dissolution of "labyrinthodonts" into separate groups such as temnospondyls and anthracosaurs has cast doubt on these traditional amphibian subclasses.

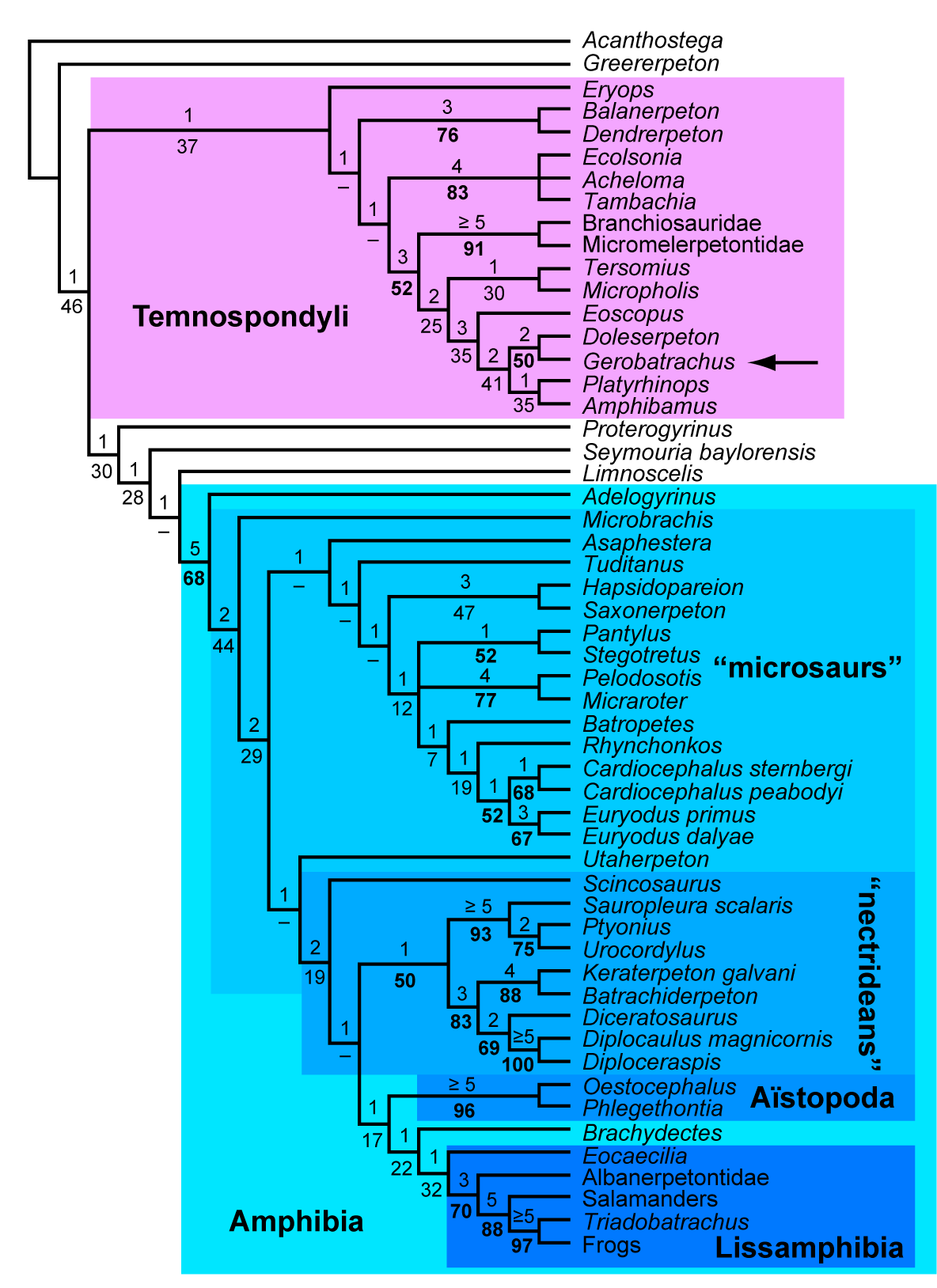
Marjanovic & Laurin 2009 tree from SOM

Much like "Labyrinthodontia", many studies propose that Lepospondyli is an artificial (polyphyletic) grouping with some members closely related to extinct stem tetrapod groups and others more closely related to modern amphibians or reptiles. Early phylogenetic analyses conducted in the 1980s and 1990s often maintained the idea that lepospondyls were paraphyletic, with nectrideans close to colosteids and microsaurs close to temnospondyls, which were considered to be ancestral to modern amphibians.

However, a 1995 paper by Robert Carroll argued that lepospondyls were actually a monophyletic group closer to reptiles. Carroll considered them closer to reptiles than the seymouriamorphs, but not as close as the diadectomorphs. Many phylogenetic analyses since Carroll (1995) agreed with his interpretation, including Laurin & Reisz (1997), Anderson (2001), and Ruta et al. (2003). A few have still considered lepospondyls ancestral to amphibians, but came to this conclusion without changing the position of lepospondyls compared to seymouriamorphs and diadectomorphs.

Lepospondyl and tetrapod classification is still controversial, and many recent studies have had doubts about lepospondyl monophyly. For example, a 2007 paper has suggested that adelospondyls are stem-tetrapods close to colosteids a 2017 paper on Lethiscus has Aïstopoda in the tetrapod stem based on their primitive braincase, and a 2026 paper finds 'lepospondyls' scattered as stem tetrapods, total-group amniotes, and even temnospondyls.

=== Interrelationships ===
Five traditional groups of lepospondyls are often recognized: Microsauria, a superficially lizard- or salamander-like and species-rich group; Lysorophia, a group with elongated bodies and very small limbs; Aïstopoda, a group of limbless, extremely elongated snake-like forms; Adelospondyli, a group of presumably aquatic forms that resemble aïstopods, but have more solidly built skulls; and Nectridea, another diverse group that includes terrestrial and aquatic newt-like forms. Microsauria is generally considered paraphyletic; rather than being a monophyletic group, it has been considered an evolutionary grade of basal ("primitive") lepospondyls, although there is growing consensus that a large subset of fossorially-adapted microsaurs, the Recumbirostra, are stem amniotes. Lysorophia may belong within the Recumbirostran clade, distinct from other derived lepospondyls. Nectridea may also be paraphyletic, consisting of a range of more anatomically-specialized lepospondyls or temnospondyls. The name Holospondyli has been proposed for a clade including aïstopods, and nectrideans, and possibly adelospondyls, although not all recent phylogenetic analyses support the grouping. The following cladogram, simplified, is after an analysis of tetrapods and stem-tetrapods presented by Ruta et al. in 2003:

- Lepospondyli
  - - Batropetes fritschi
    - - Tuditanus punctulatus
      - - - Pantylus cordatus
          - Stegotretus agyrus
        - - Asaphestera intermedia
          - - Saxonerpeton geinitzi
            - - Hapsidopareion lepton
              - - - Micraroter erythrogeios
                  - Pelodosotis elongatum
                - - Rhynchonkos stovalli
                  - - Cardiocephalus sternbergi
                    - Euryodus primus
  - - - Microbrachis pelikani
      - - Hyloplesion longicostatum
        - Odonterpeton triangulare
    - - Lysorophia
        - Brachydectes spp.
      - - - Acherontiscidae
            - Acherontiscus caledoniae
          - Adelospondyli
            - Adelospondylus watsoni
            - - Adelogyrinus simorhynchus
              - Dolichopareias disjectus
        - Holospondyli
          - - Scincosaurus crassus
            - - Keraterpeton galvani
              - - Batrachiderpeton reticulatum
                - Diceratosaurus brevirostris
                - - Diplocaulus magnicornis
                  - Diploceraspis burkei
          - - - Ptyonius marshii
              - - Sauropleura spp.
                - Urocordylus wandesfordii
            - Aistopoda
              - Lethiscus stocki
              - Oestocephalus amphiuminum
              - Phlegethontia linearis

=== Position within Tetrapoda ===
The "lepospondyl hypothesis" of modern amphibian origins proposes that lissamphibians are monophyletic (that is, they form their own clade) and that they evolved from lepospondyl ancestors. Two alternatives are the "temnospondyl hypothesis", in which lissamphibians originated within Temnospondyli, and the "polyphyly hypothesis", in which caecilians originated from lepospondyls while frogs and salamanders (collectively grouped within Batrachia) evolved from temnospondyls. Of the three hypotheses, the temnospondyl hypothesis is currently the most widely accepted among researchers. Strong support for this relationship comes from a suite of anatomical features shared between lissamphibians and a group of Paleozoic temnospondyls called dissorophoids. Under this hypothesis, Lepospondyli either falls outside crown group Tetrapoda (the smallest clade containing all living tetrapods, i.e. the smallest clade containing Lissamphibia and Amniota), or is closer to amniotes and therefore part of Reptiliomorpha. However, some phylogenetic analyses continue to find support for the lepospondyl hypothesis. The analysis by Vallin and Laurin (2004) found lissamphibians to be most closely related to lysorophians, followed by microsaurs. Pawley (2006) also found lysorophians to be the closest relatives of lissamphibians, but found aïstopods and adelogyrinids rather than microsaurs to be the second most closely related groups. Marjanović (2010) found holospondyls to be the most closely related group to lissamphibians, followed by lysorophians. Under this hypothesis, lepospondyls would be crown tetrapods, and temnospondyls would be stem tetrapods.

Below is a cladogram from Ruta et al. (2003) that supports the "temnospondyl hypothesis", showing the position of Lepospondyli within crown group Tetrapoda:

- Crown group Tetrapoda
  - Lissamphibia + Temnospondyli
  - - Caerorhachis bairdi
    - - - Eoherpetontidae
          - Eoherpeton watsoni
        - Embolomeri
          - Proterogyrinus scheelei
          - - Archeria crassidisca
            - Pholiderpeton scutigerum
            - - Anthracosaurus russelli
              - Pholiderpeton attheyi (now Eogyrinus)
      - - Gephyrostegidae
          - Bruktererpeton fiebigi
          - Gephyrostegus bohemicus
        - - Solenodonsaurus janenschi
          - - Seymouriamorpha
              - Kotlassia prima
              - - Discosauriscus austriacus
                - Seymouria spp.
            - - - Lepospondyli
                - Westlothiana lizziae
              - - Amniota
                - Diadectomorpha
                  - Diadectes absitus (now Silvadectes)
                  - Limnoscelis paludis

== Gallery ==
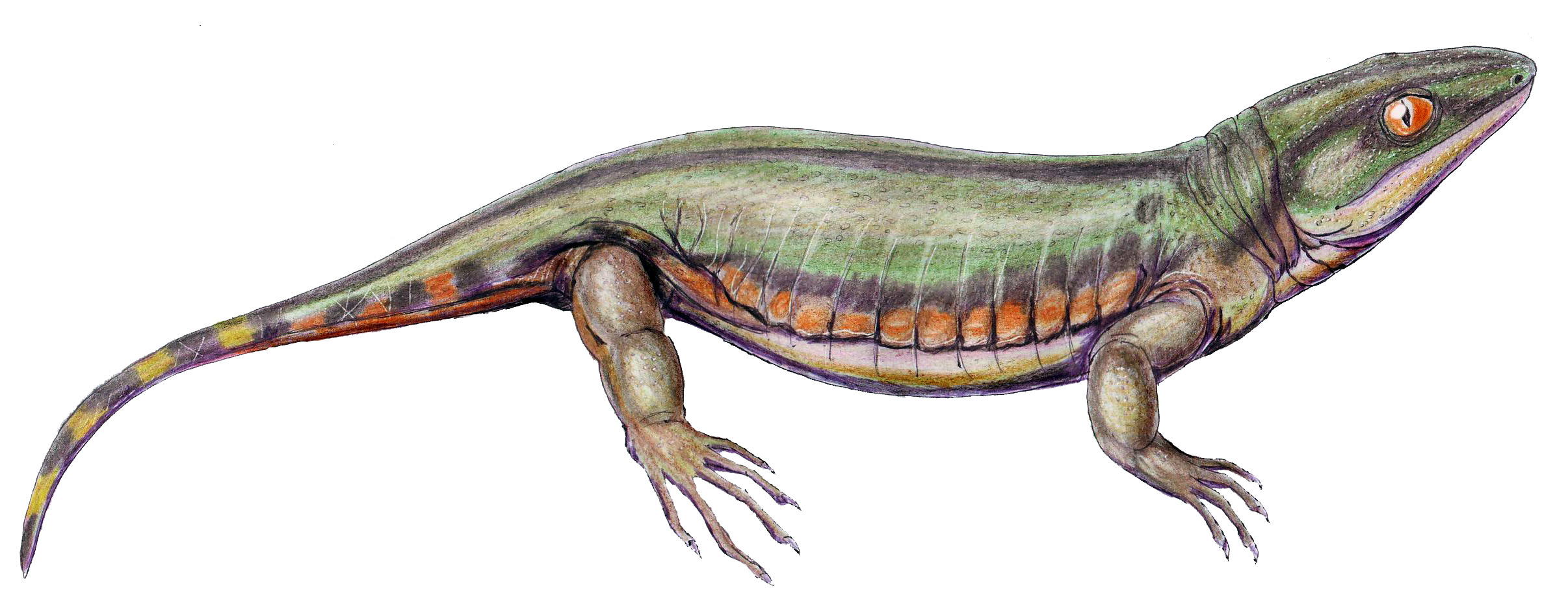
Tuditanus, a tuditanid "microsaur"

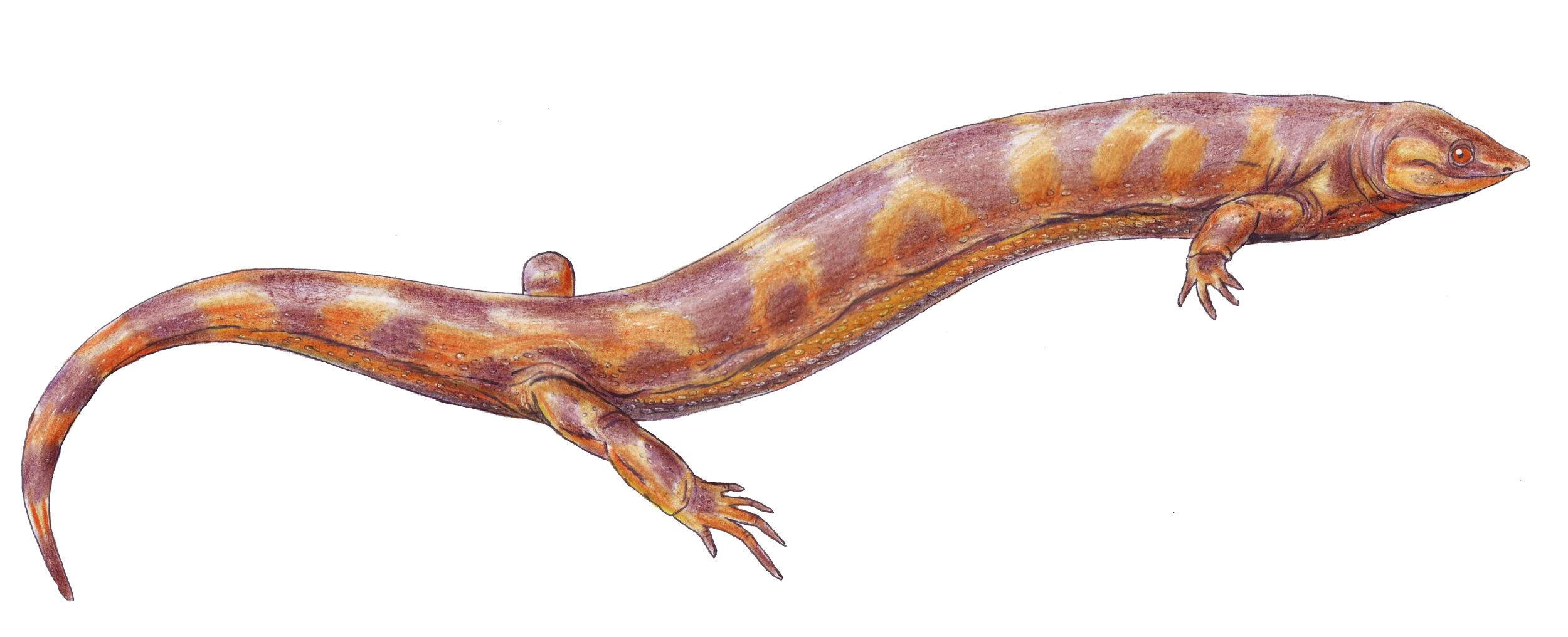
Pelodosotis, an ostodolepid "microsaur"

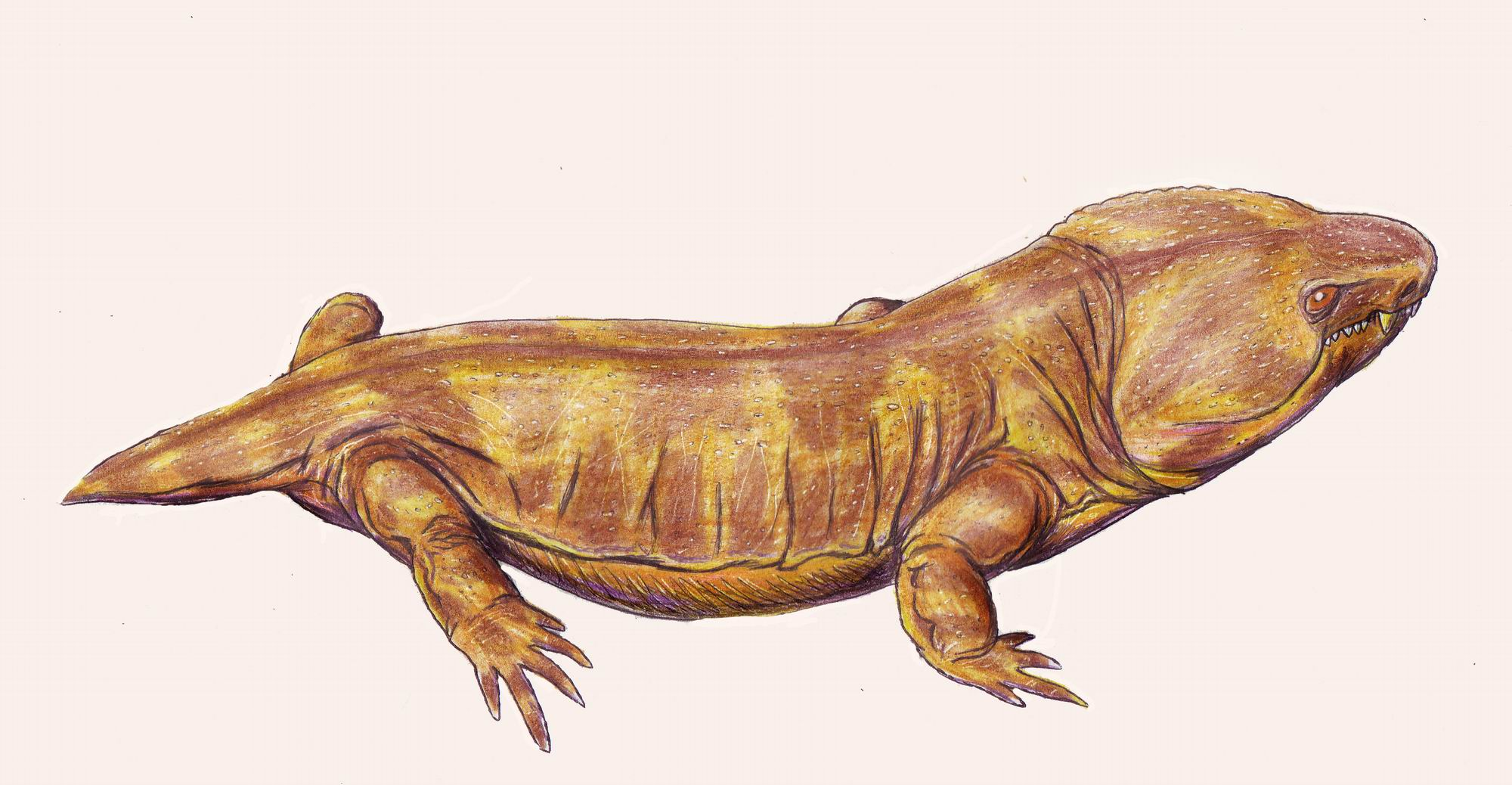
Pantylus, a pantylid "microsaur"

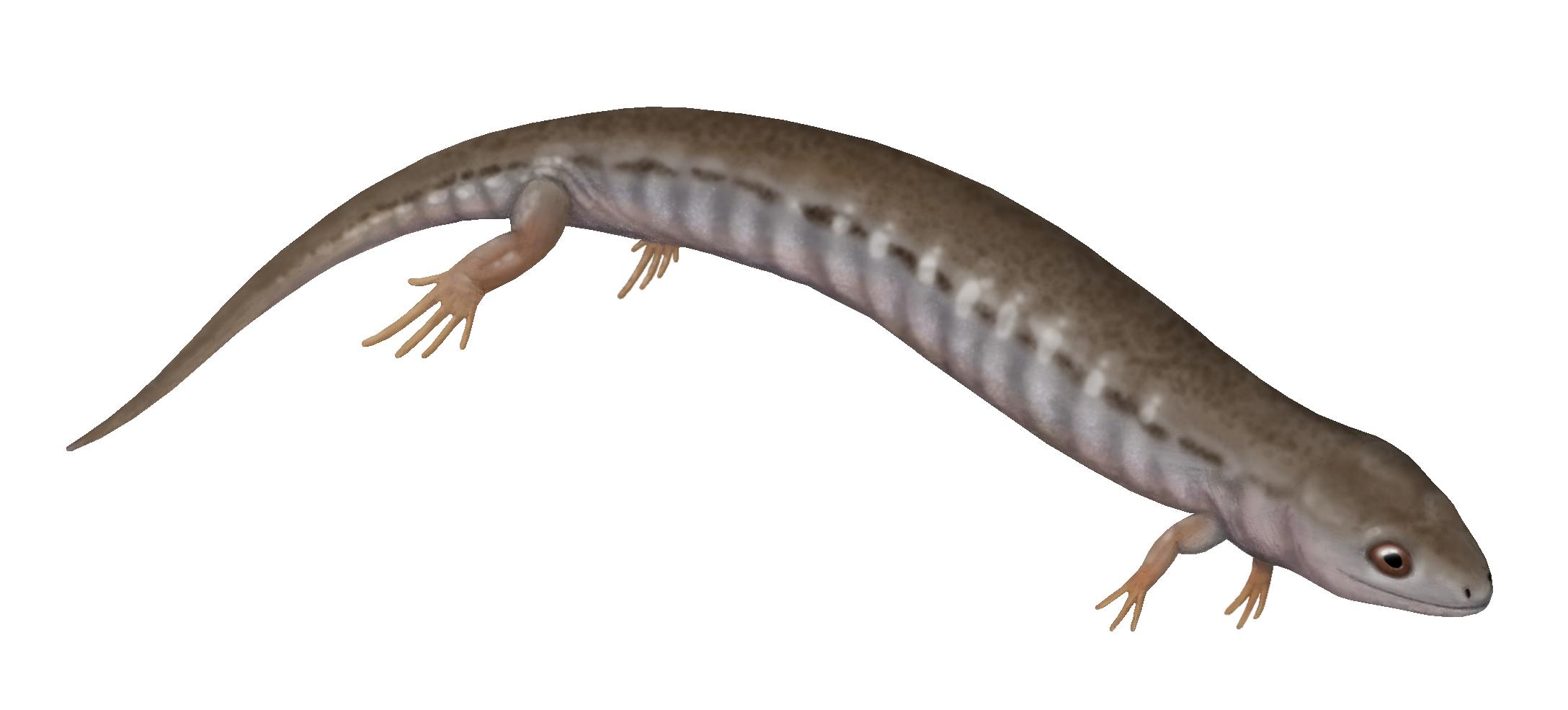
Hyloplesion, a "microsaur"

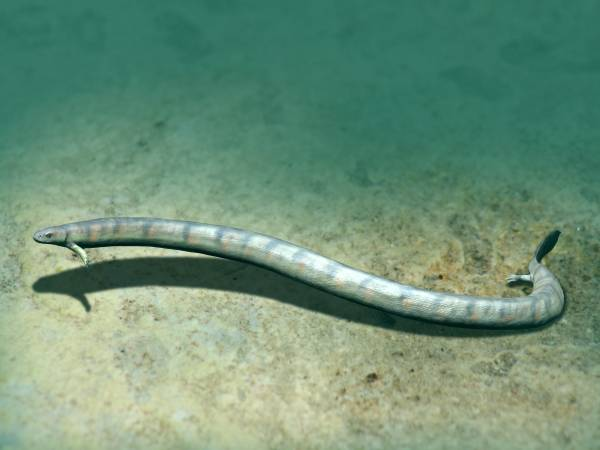
Brachydectes, a lysorophian

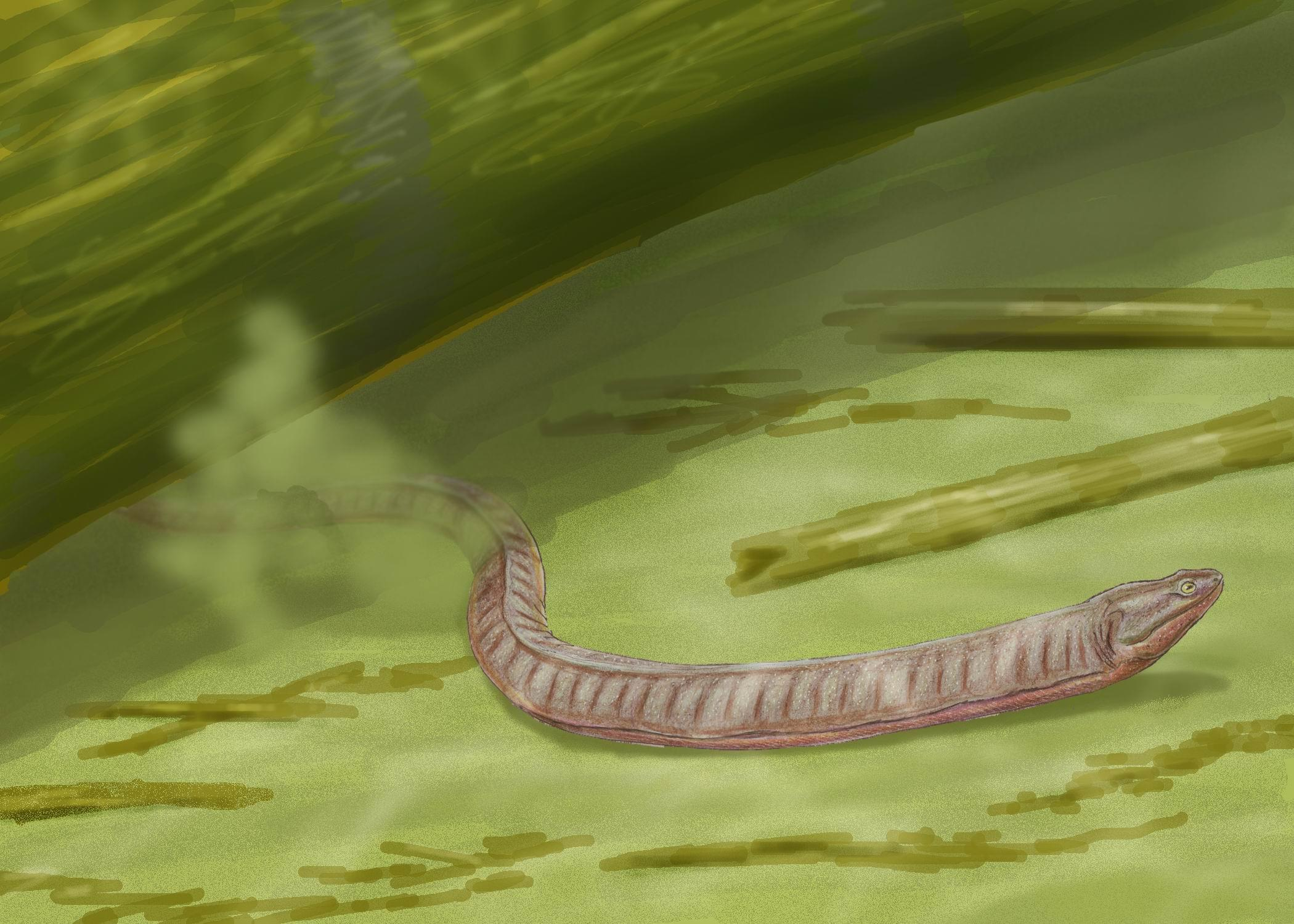
Adelospondylus, an adelospondyl

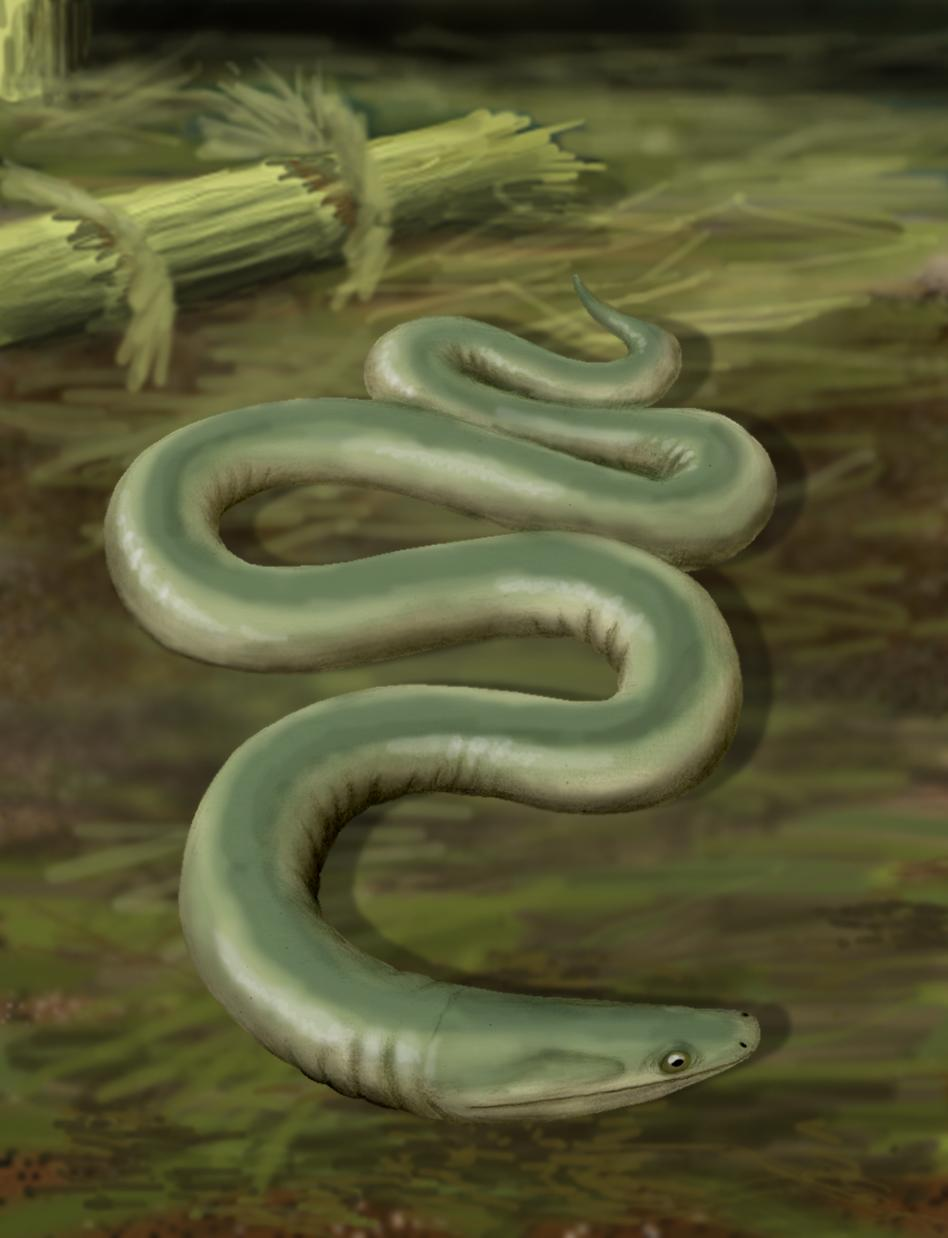
Oestocephalus, an early aïstopod

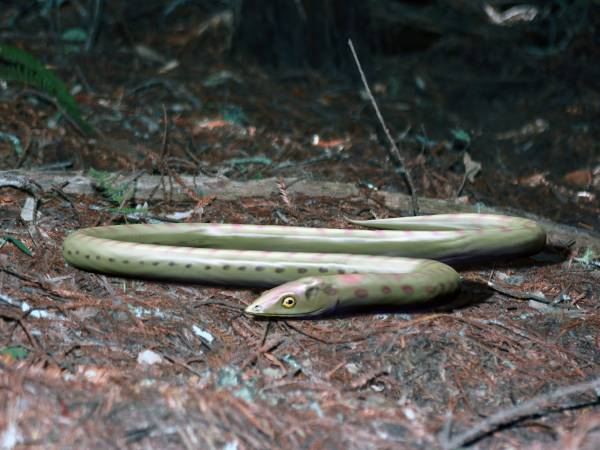
Phlegethontia, an aïstopod

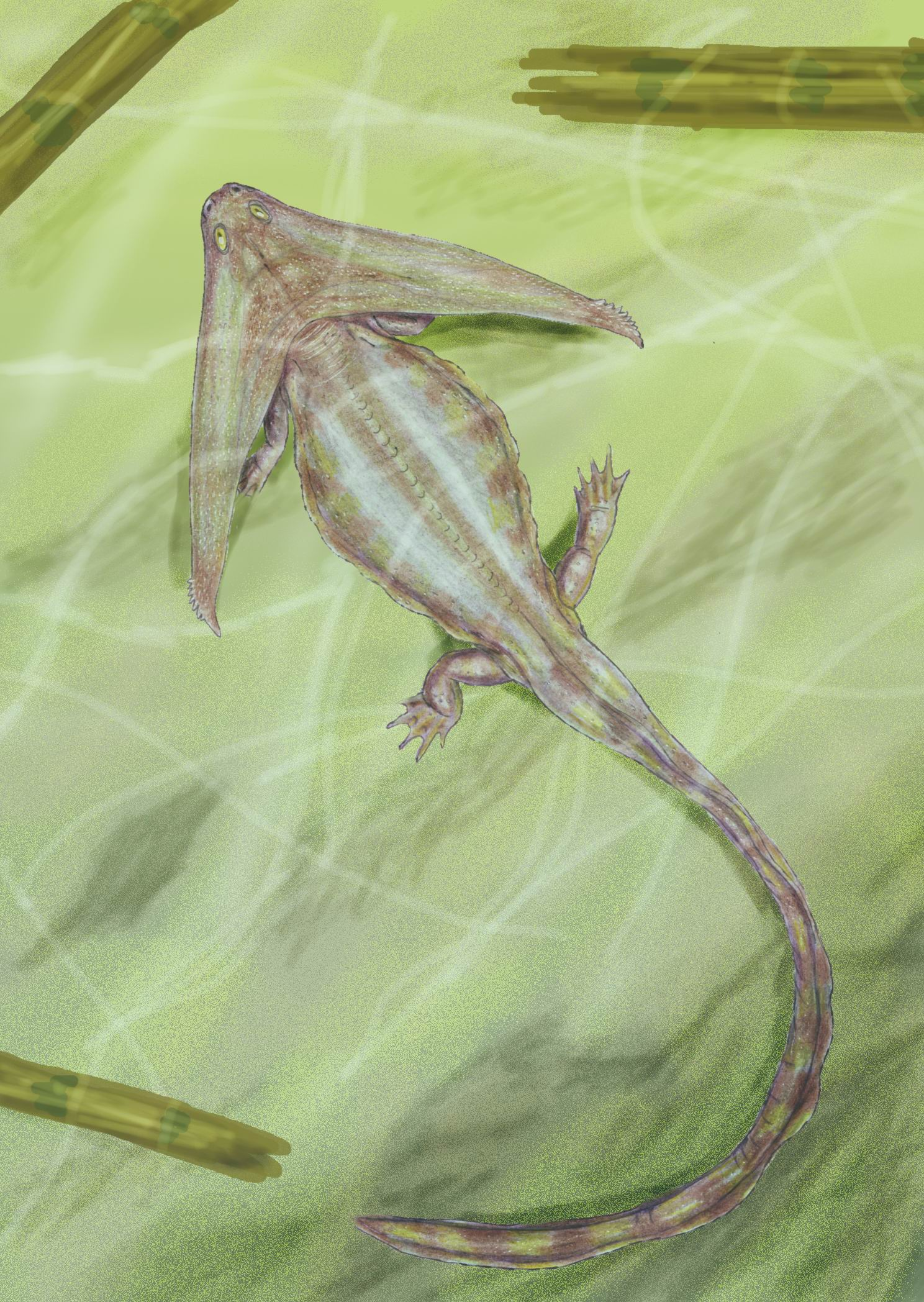
Diploceraspis, a diplocaulid "nectridean"

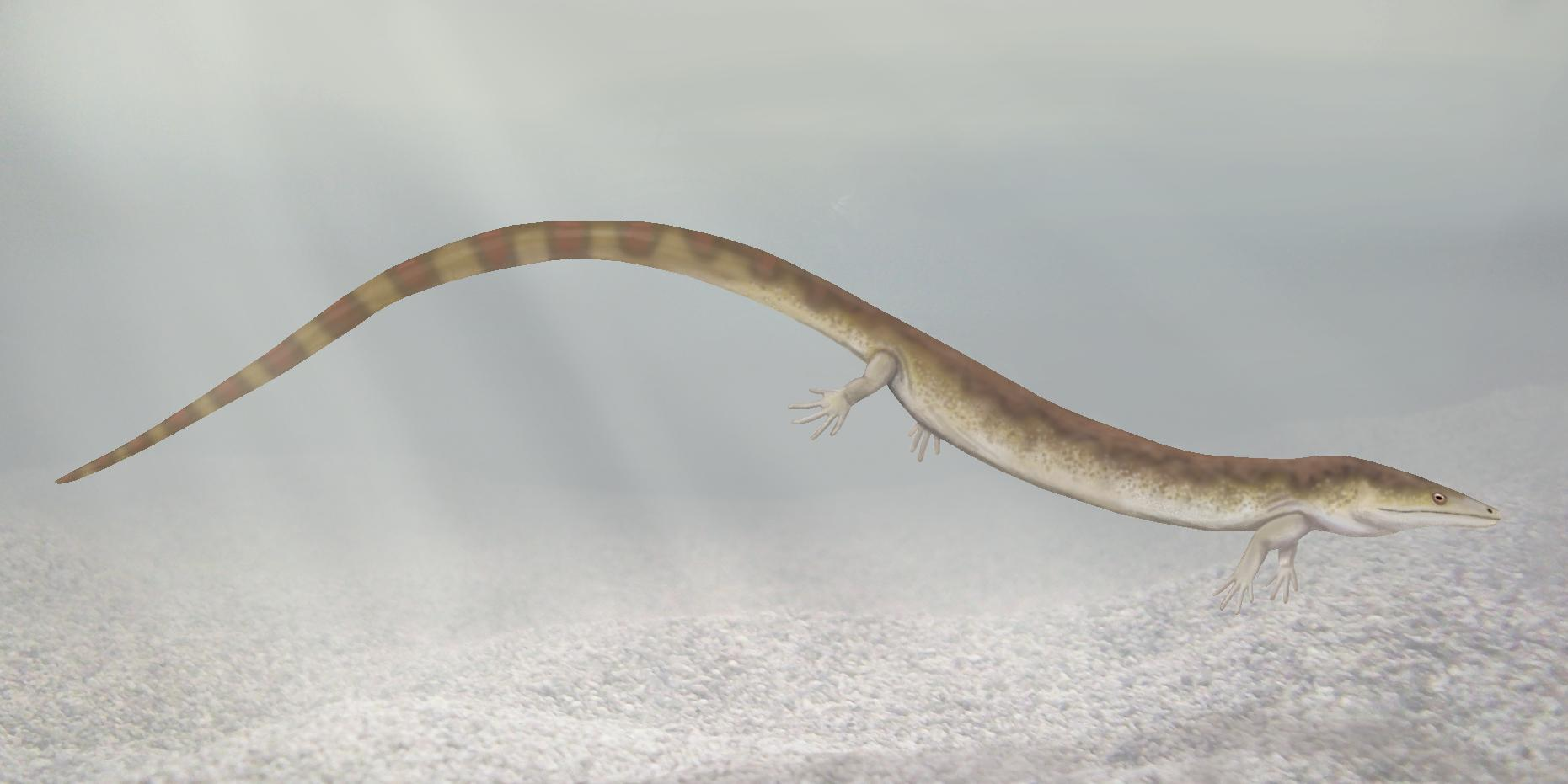
Sauropleura, a urocordylid "nectridean"
