= Lepterpeton =

Scientific classification
- Kingdom: Animalia
- Phylum: Chordata
- Order: †Nectridea
- Family: †Urocordylidae
- Subfamily: †Sauropleurinae
- Genus: †Lepterpeton; Wright & Huxley, 1866

Extinct genus of tetrapodomorphs

Lepterpeton is an extinct genus of nectridean tetrapodomorphs within the family Urocordylidae.
