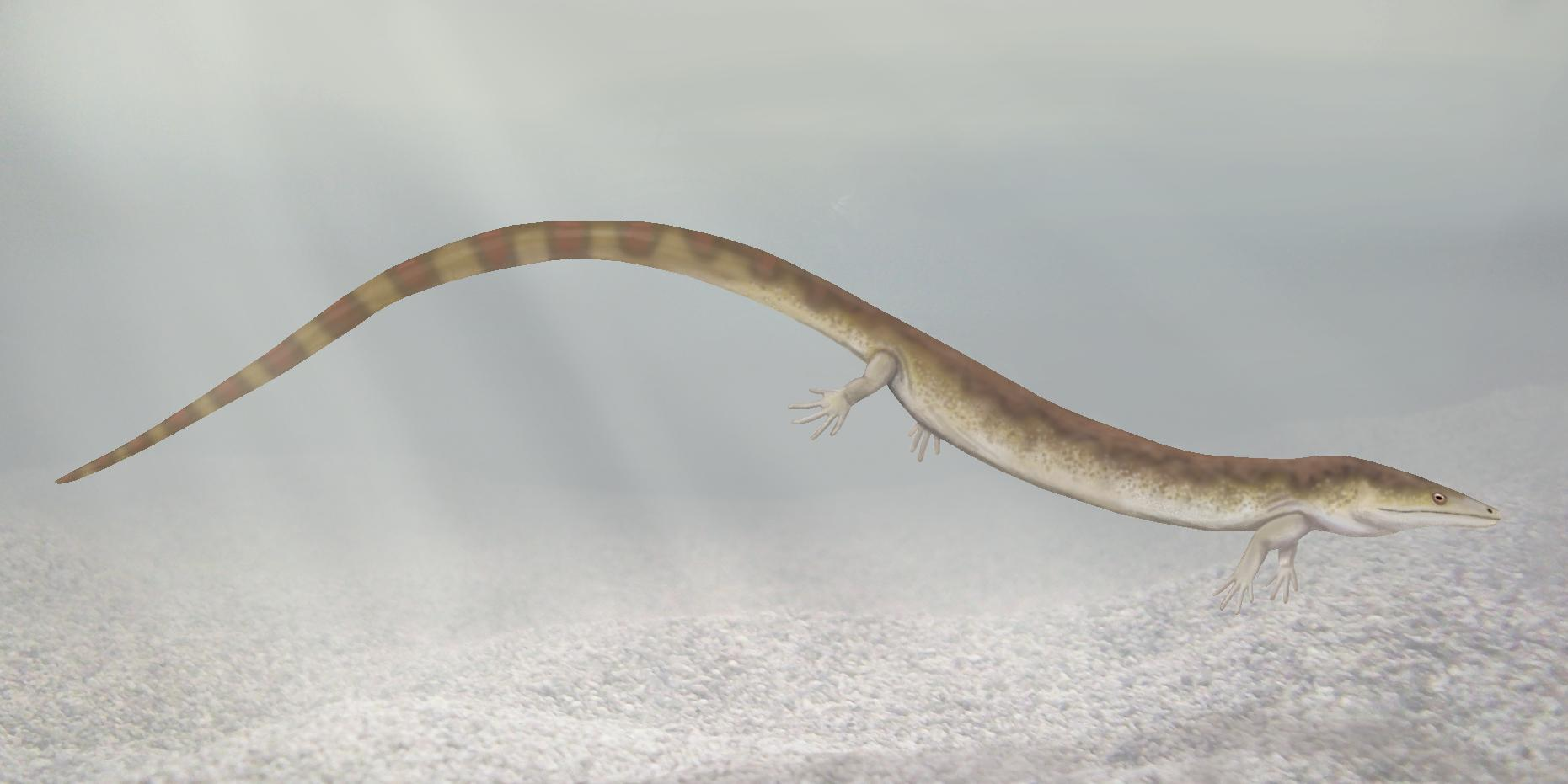
- Life restoration of Sauropleura pectinata

Scientific classification
- Kingdom: Animalia
- Phylum: Chordata
- Order: †Nectridea
- Family: †Urocordylidae
- Subfamily: †Sauropleurinae
- Genus: †Sauropleura; Cope, 1868

Type species
- Sauropleura pectinata Cope, 1868

= Sauropleura =

Sauropleura Temporal range: Late Carboniferous–Early Permian (Moscovian–Sakmarian)

Extinct genus of tetrapodomorphs

Sauropleura (meaning "lizard side") is an extinct genus of urocordylid tetrapod and the namesake of the subfamily Sauropleurinae. Its fossils are known from the Late Carboniferous of Ohio and the Czech Republic, and the Early Permian of Texas. Like other urocordylids, Sauropleura was an aquatic newt-like animal with a long body, small limbs, and a deep tail. It has a slender, tapering snout, and a particularly long tail with over 60 caudal vertebrae. Sauropleura scalaris is the first urocordylid with direct evidence of a lateral line, based on pits and grooves on its lower jaw.

== Species ==
There are three valid species widely considered to belong within Sauropleura: S. pectinata, S. bairdi, and S. scalaris. A fourth potential species, Sauropleura longicaudata from Montceau-les-Mines, France, was later split into its own genus, Montcellia.

=== S. pectinata ===
Sauropleura pectinata is from Linton, a fossil site in the Late Carboniferous (Moscovian) Allegheny Group of Ohio. It is the type species of Sauropleura, named by E.D. Cope in 1868.

In the following decades, various authors (Cope included) treated Sauropleura as a wastebasket for numerous Linton amphibian species (S. enchodus, S. digitata, S. foveata, S. latithorax, S. longidentata, S. longipes, S. newberryi, S. pauciradiata, S. remex, S. scutellata). Most of these appear to be synonyms of previously named fish and amphibian species, or new taxa outside of Sauropleura. For example, S. remex is now known as Ctenerpeton remex, and S. digitata is now Eusauropleura digitata. Romer (1930) reviewed the Linton fossils known to him at the time, sorting out the wastebasket status of Sauropleura. Apart from S. pectinata, he elected to leave one more Linton Sauropleura species as valid: S. marshii. Later studies generally treat S. marshii as a species of Ptyonius.

=== S. bairdi ===
Sauropleura bairdi is from the Early Permian (Asselian–early Sakmarian) Archer City Formation of Texas. It is based on a partial skeleton described by Bossy & Milner (1998). S. bairdi appears similar to Crossotelos, and may belong in that genus, though it does not preserve diagnostic areas to clarify this possibility.

=== S. scalaris ===
Sauropleura scalaris is from Nýřany, a fossil site in the Late Carboniferous (upper Moscovian) Kladno Formation of the Czech Republic. Antonín Frič (1875) originally named it as a species of Urocordylus, Urocordylus scalaris. Despite its good sample of fossils, S. scalaris is rarely a subject of study. For example, one well-preserved skeleton first mentioned by Stehlík (1924) was only fully described nearly a century later, by Barták & Ivanov (2023).

Frič named many different species of Nýřany tetrapod fossils, some of which turned out to be junior synonyms of U. scalaris. Examples include Dolichosoma angustatum (named for a partial skull), Ptyonius bendai, and Ptyonius distinctus (named for a nearly complete skeleton). Steen (1938) classified the former as another species of Urocordylus (U. angustatus) and the latter two as synonyms of U. scalaris. Baird (1964) provided the new combination Sauropleura scalaris, recognizing its distinction from Urocordylus.
