= Montcellia =

Scientific classification
- Kingdom: Animalia
- Phylum: Chordata
- Order: †Nectridea
- Family: †Urocordylidae
- Subfamily: †Sauropleurinae
- Genus: †Montcellia; Dutuit and Heyler, 1994
- Species: †M. longicaudata

Binomial name
- †Montcellia longicaudata Moodie, 1909

Extinct genus of tetrapodomorphs

Montcellia is an extinct genus of nectridean tetrapodomorphs within the family Urocordylidae that lived in the late Carboniferous period in the modern France.
