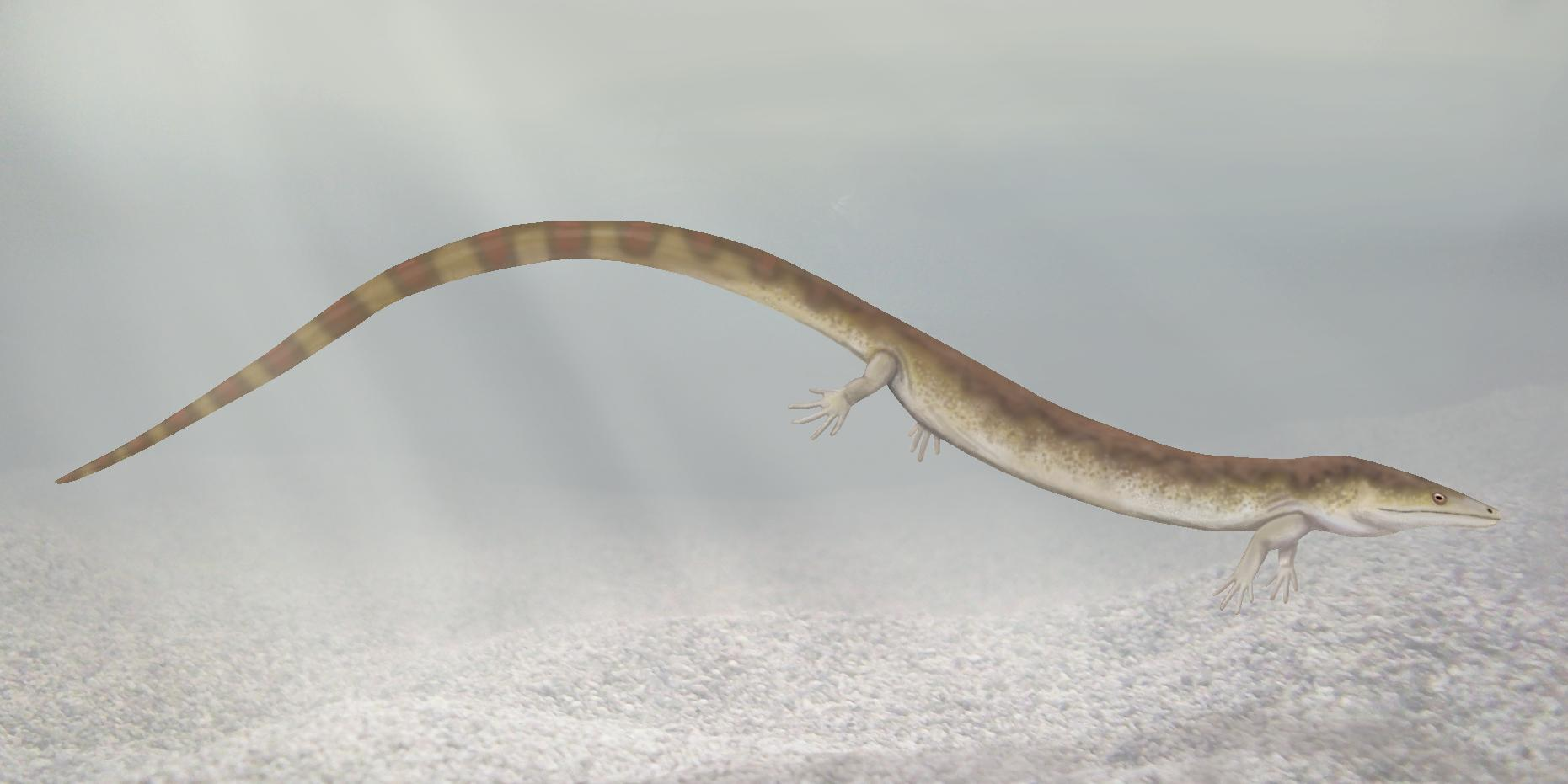
- Restoration of Sauropleura pectinata

Scientific classification
- Domain: Eukaryota
- Kingdom: Animalia
- Phylum: Chordata
- Clade: Sarcopterygii
- Clade: Tetrapodomorpha
- Order: †Nectridea
- Family: †Urocordylidae
- Subfamily: †Sauropleurinae; Carroll, 1978

Genera
- †Crossotelos; †Lepterpeton; †Montcellia; †Sauropleura

= Sauropleurinae =

Sauropleurinae Temporal range: Pennsylvanian–Cisuralian

Extinct subfamily of tetrapodomorphs

Sauropleurinae is an extinct subfamily of nectridean tetrapodomorphs. Along with the subfamily Urocordylinae, Sauropleurinae is part of the family Urocordylidae. Like other urocordylids, sauropleurines have long, flattened tails and superficially resemble aquatic newts. They differ from urocordylines in having narrow, pointed skulls. Sauropleurinae includes the genera Sauropleura, Crossotelos, Lepterpeton, and Montcellia, which lived during the Late Carboniferous and Early Permian in what is now North America and Europe.
