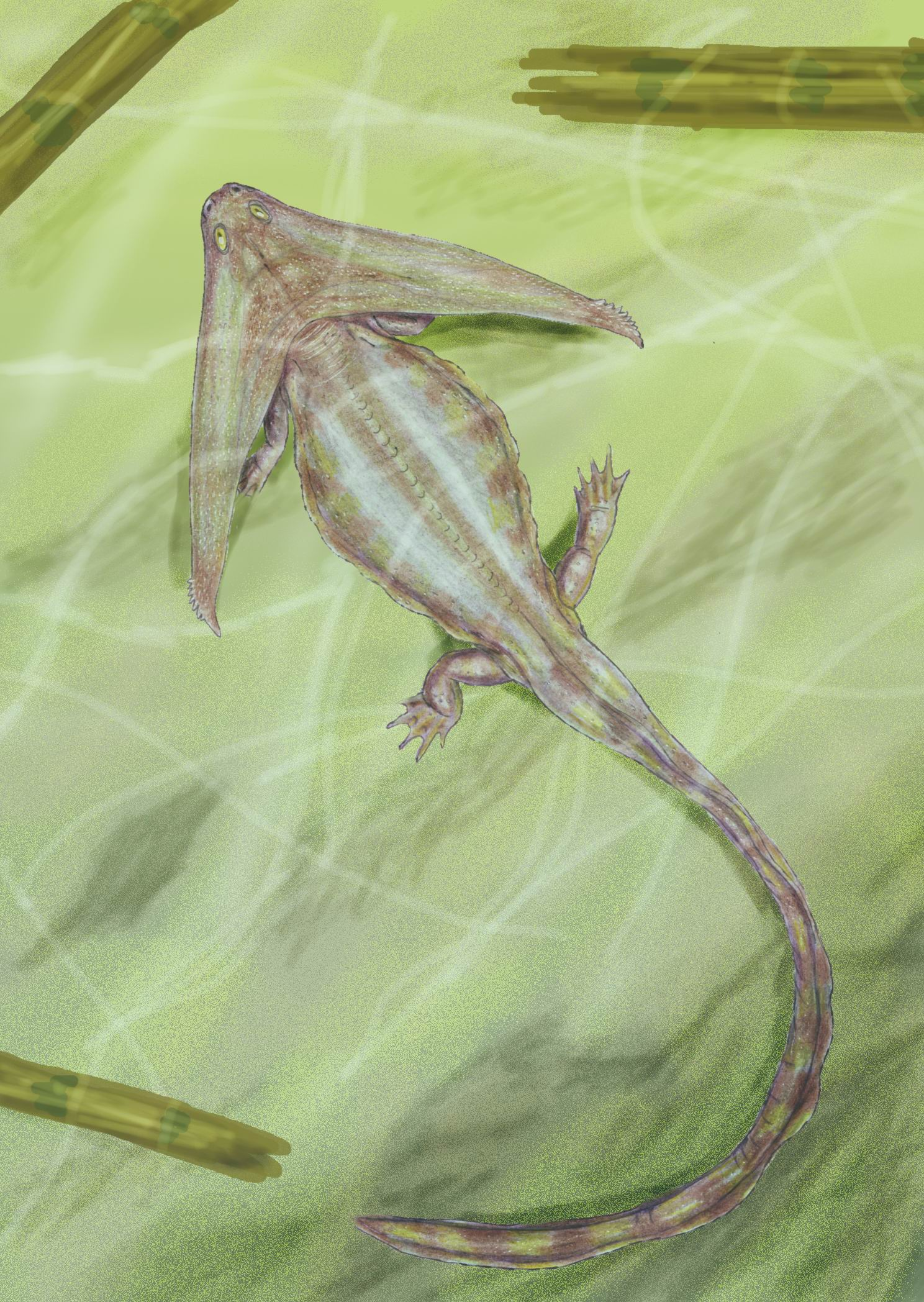
- Life restoration of Diploceraspis burkei

Scientific classification
- Kingdom: Animalia
- Phylum: Chordata
- Clade: †Lepospondyli
- (unranked): †Holospondyli; Thomson & Bossy, 1970

Groups
- †Aïstopoda; †Nectridea; †Adelospondyli?; Gymnophiona?

= Holospondyli =

Holospondyli Temporal range: Early Carboniferous - Late Permian

Polyphyletic group of tetrapodomorphs

Holospondyli is a proposed clade of lepospondyls from the Early Carboniferous to the Late Permian that includes the aistopods, the nectrideans, and possibly also Adelospondyli. However, the monophyly of this clade remains highly contentious, as some parsimony trees recover aistopods as stem-tetrapods more primitive than temnospondyls or other groups of lepospondyls, with the most recent study tentatively supporting it.
