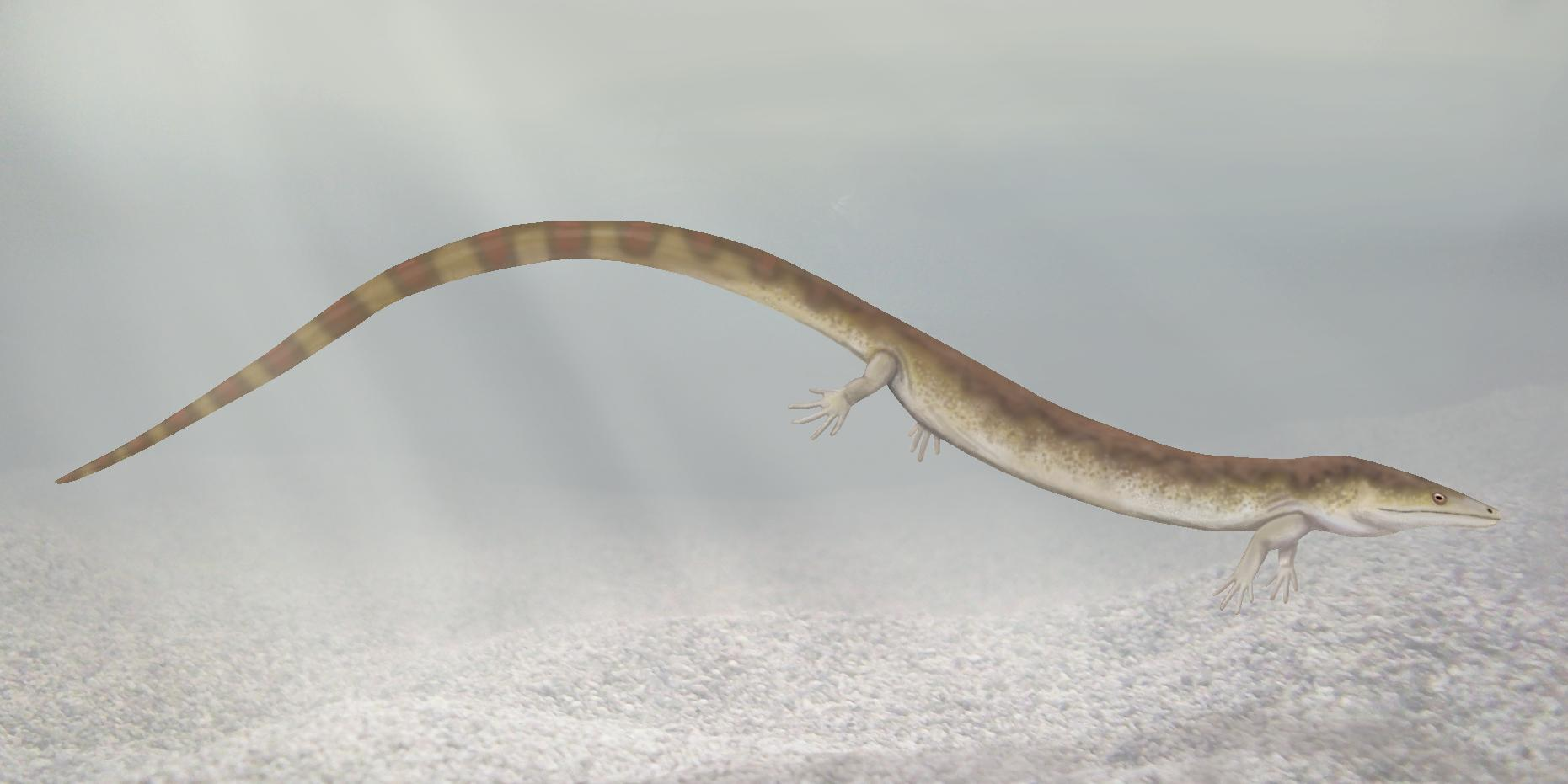
- Life restoration of Sauropleura pectinata

Scientific classification
- Kingdom: Animalia
- Phylum: Chordata
- Order: †Nectridea
- Family: †Urocordylidae; Lydekker, 1889

Subfamilies
- †Sauropleurinae; †Urocordylinae

= Urocordylidae =

Urocordylidae Temporal range: Late Carboniferous

Extinct family of tetrapodomorphs

The Urocordylidae are an extinct family of nectridean lepospondyl amphibians. Urocordylids lived during the Late Carboniferous and Early Permian in what is now Europe and North America and are characterized by their very long, paddle-like tails. In life, they were probably newt-like and aquatic.

Fossils have been found from Ireland, France, and the eastern United States. The family was named by English naturalist Richard Lydekker in 1889 and includes the well-known genera Urocordylus and Sauropleura, as well as several others based on less-complete material. The family Urocordylidae is divided into two subfamilies, the Urocordylinae and the Sauropleurinae. The two groups are distinguished by the shapes of their skulls; urocordylines have short, blunt skulls, and sauropleurines have longer, pointed skulls.

== Description ==
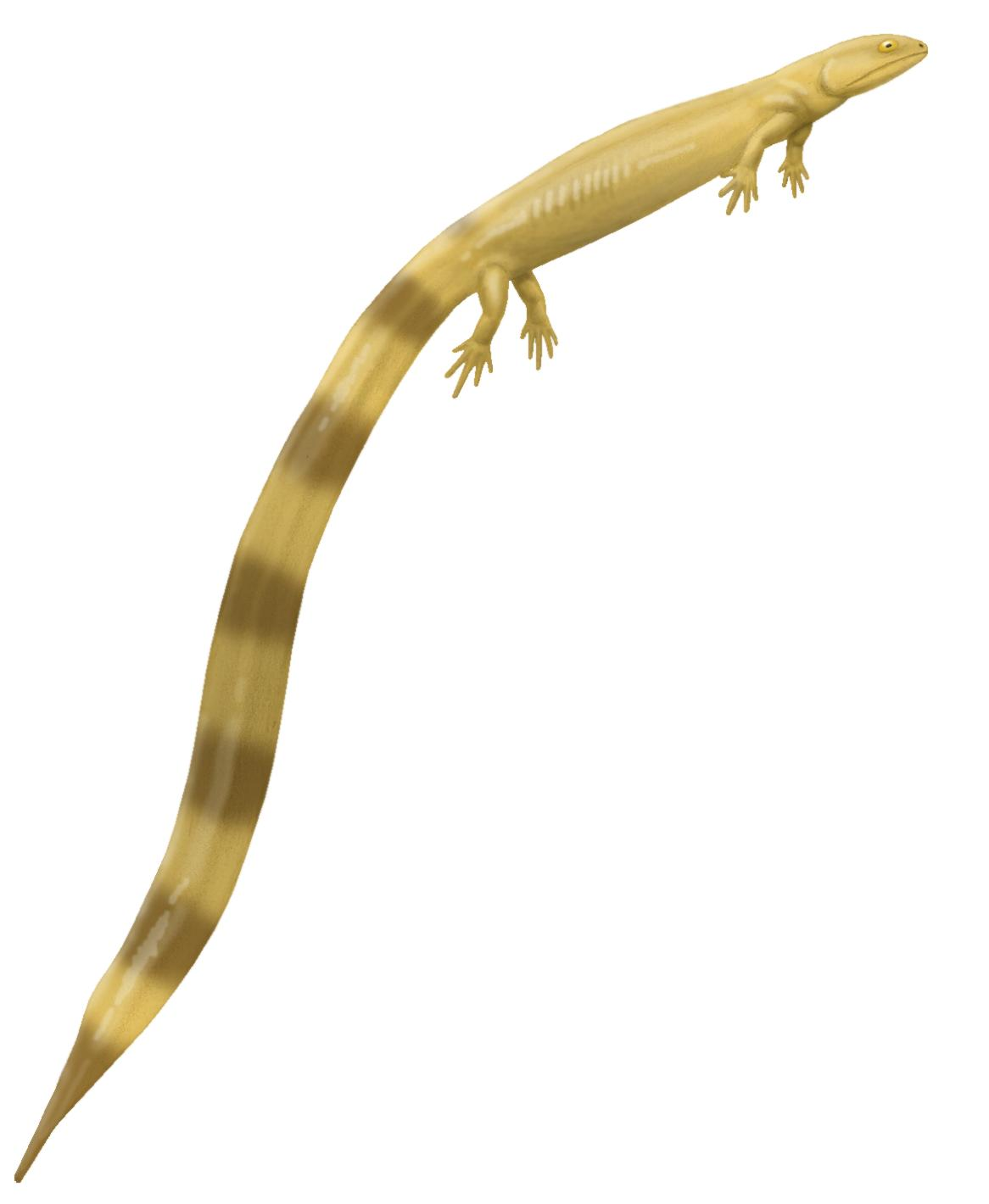
Life restoration of Urocordylus wandesfordii, an early urocordylid from Ireland

Urocordylids are distinguished by their elongated tails. Each tail vertebra has an upper crest of bone called a neural arch and a lower crest called a haemal arch, and each of these arches is square-shaped and laterally compressed (flattened side-to-side). These arches give the tails of urocordylids a paddle-like shape. The urocordylids Sauropleura and Crossotelos have holes in their tail vertebrae that are thought to have served as passageways for spinal nerves, an unusual feature given that spinal nerves pass between successive vertebrae in most vertebrates. Salamanders also have spinal nerves passing through their vertebrae, although the holes are in different positions and do not indicate a close evolutionary relationship with urocordylids.

Another distinguishing feature of urocordylids is the loose connection between the bones of the skull. The bones at the back of the lower jaw do not connect with the rest of the skull. Instead, a gap extends across the skull and closes in front of the eye sockets. This allows the upper jaw to flex upward, increasing the gape of the mouth. The bones at the back of the jaw may also be able to flex outward. The flexibility of the jaws of urocordylids may have been an adaptation for feeding, allowing sharp teeth at the tip of the jaw to face outward so prey could be more easily captured.

== Relationships ==
Urocordylids belong to a large group of Paleozoic amphibians called lepospondyls, which are distinguished from other early land vertebrates by their simple spool-shaped vertebrae. The Urocordylidae belong to a group within the Lepospondyli called the Nectridea, which include forms with long tails and short bodies. Urocordylids have traditionally been considered the most primitive nectrideans because they lack some of the more unusual features of other members of the group, such as the tabular horns of diplocaulids. However, some recent phylogenetic analyses of lepospondyls have not supported a primitive position for urocordylids among nectrideans. The analysis of Ruta et al. (2003), for example, places the Urocordylidae as the closest relatives of a group of legless lepospondyls called the Aistopoda, while other nectrideans fall into a more basal position on the evolutionary tree. This splits up the Nectridea, making them a polyphyletic taxon and not a true clade or evolutionary grouping. Below is part of the cladogram from Ruta et al.:

- Lepospondyli
  - - Batropetes fritschi
    - Tuditanomorpha
  - - - Microbrachis pelikani
      - - Hyloplesion longicostatum
        - Odonterpeton triangulare
    - - Lysorophia
      - - Adelospondyli
        - Holospondyli
          - - Scincosauridae
            - Diplocaulidae
          - - Urocordylidae
            - Aistopoda
