= Carbonita (crustacean) =

Carbonita Temporal range: Carboniferous - Early Permian

Scientific classification
- Kingdom: Animalia
- Phylum: Arthropoda
- Subphylum: Crustacea
- Class: Ostracoda
- Order: Podocopida
- Family: Carbonitidae
- Genus: Carbonita Strand, 1928

Synonyms
- Carbonia Jones, 1870

Extinct genus of seed shrimps

Carbonita is an extinct genus of nonmarine ostracod crustaceans that lived during the Carboniferous period.

== Species ==
The genus contains four species:

- Carbonita evelinae (Jones, 1870)
- Carbonita pungens (Jones & Kirkby, 1867)
- Carbonita ovata Retrum & Kaesler, 2005
- Carbonita triangulata Retrum & Kaesler, 2005
