= Crossotelos =

Scientific classification
- Kingdom: Animalia
- Phylum: Chordata
- Order: †Nectridea
- Family: †Urocordylidae
- Subfamily: †Sauropleurinae
- Genus: †Crossotelos; Case, 1911

Extinct genus of tetrapodomorphs

Crossotelos is an extinct genus of nectridean tetrapodomorphs within the family Urocordylidae. It contains a single species, Crossotelos annulatus.

Crossotelos lived in modern-day Oklahoma and Texas, United States during the Early Permian.
