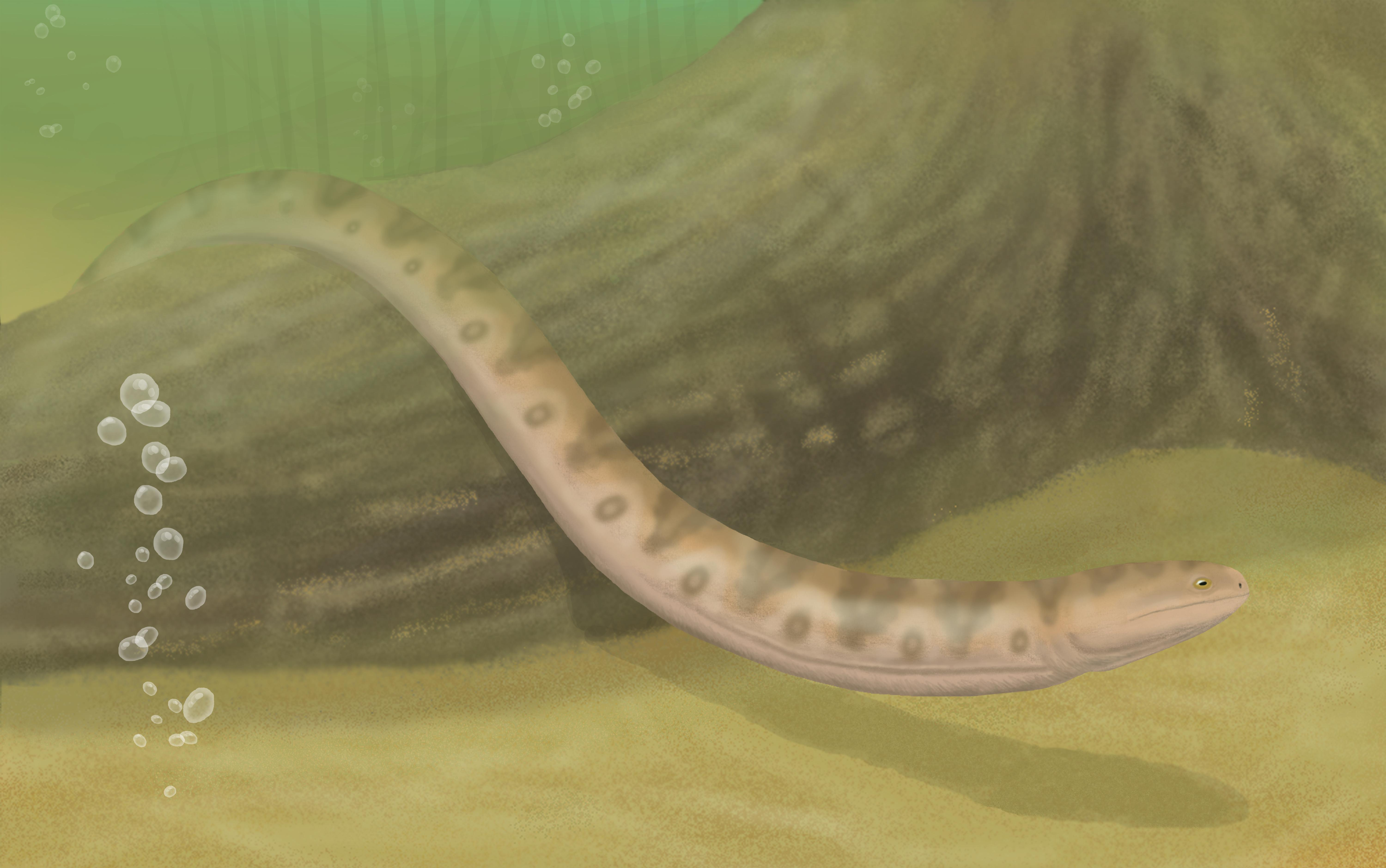

Scientific classification
- Domain: Eukaryota
- Kingdom: Animalia
- Phylum: Chordata
- Clade: Sarcopterygii
- Clade: Tetrapodomorpha
- Order: †Adelospondyli
- Family: †Adelogyrinidae
- Genus: †Palaeomolgophis; M. C. Brough & J. Brough, 1967

Type species
- †Palaeomolgophis scoticus M. C. Brough & J. Brough, 1967

= Palaeomolgophis =

Palaeomolgophis Temporal range: Early Carboniferous, 345.3–326.4 Ma

Extinct genus of tetrapodomorphs

Palaeomolgophis is an extinct genus of eel-like adelospondyl tetrapodomorphs containing a single species—Palaeomolgophis scoticus. Their limbs are much reduced, and they were probably fully aquatic.
