= Dolichopareias =

Dolichopareias Temporal range: Carboniferous, 345.3–326.4 Ma

Scientific classification
- Kingdom: Animalia
- Phylum: Chordata
- Order: †Adelospondyli
- Family: †Adelogyrinidae
- Genus: †Dolichopareias; Watson, 1928

Type species
- Dolichopareias disjectus Watson, 1928

Extinct genus of tetrapodomorphs

Dolichopareias is an extinct genus of adelospondyl tetrapodomorph.

== See also ==
- Prehistoric amphibian
- List of prehistoric amphibians
