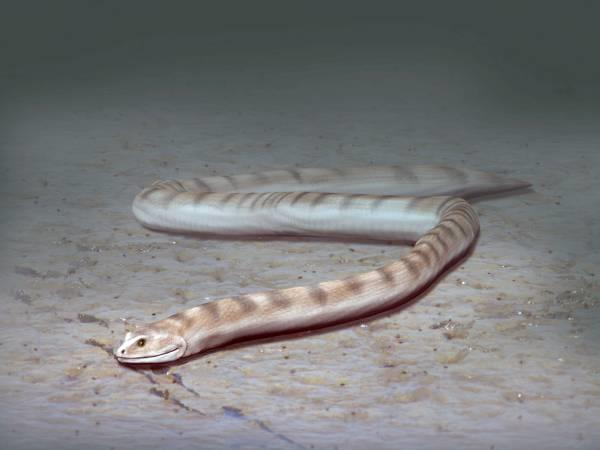
- Life restoration

Scientific classification
- Kingdom: Animalia
- Phylum: Chordata
- Order: †Adelospondyli
- Family: †Adelogyrinidae
- Genus: †Adelospondylus; Carroll, 1967

Type species
- Adelospondylus watsoni Carroll, 1967

= Adelospondylus =

Adelospondylus Temporal range: Carboniferous, 326.4–318.1 Ma

Extinct genus of tetrapodomorphs

Adelospondylus is an extinct adelospondyl tetrapodomorph from the Carboniferous of what is now Scotland.
