= Adelogyrinus =

Adelogyrinus Temporal range: Carboniferous, 345.3–326.4 Ma

Scientific classification
- Kingdom: Animalia
- Phylum: Chordata
- Order: †Adelospondyli
- Family: †Adelogyrinidae
- Genus: †Adelogyrinus; Watson, 1928

Type species
- †Adelogyrinus simorhynchus Watson, 1928

Extinct genus of tetrapodomorphs

Adelogyrinus is an extinct genus of adelospondyl tetrapodomorph, fossils of which were found in the Dunnet Shale of Scotland.
