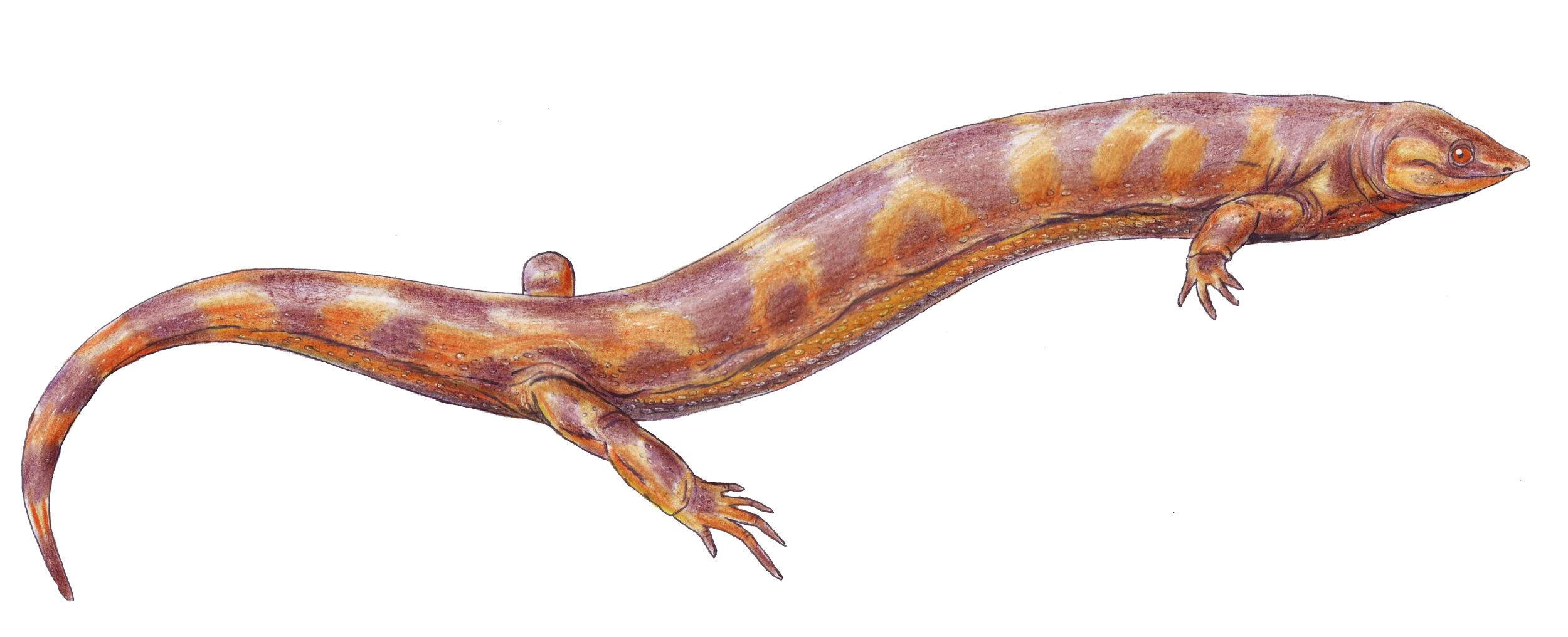

Scientific classification
- Domain: Eukaryota
- Kingdom: Animalia
- Phylum: Chordata
- Family: †Ostodolepidae
- Genus: †Pelodosotis; Carroll & Gaskill, 1978

= Pelodosotis =

Pelodosotis Temporal range: Permian

Extinct genus of tetrapods

Pelodosotis is an extinct microsaurian tetrapod.
