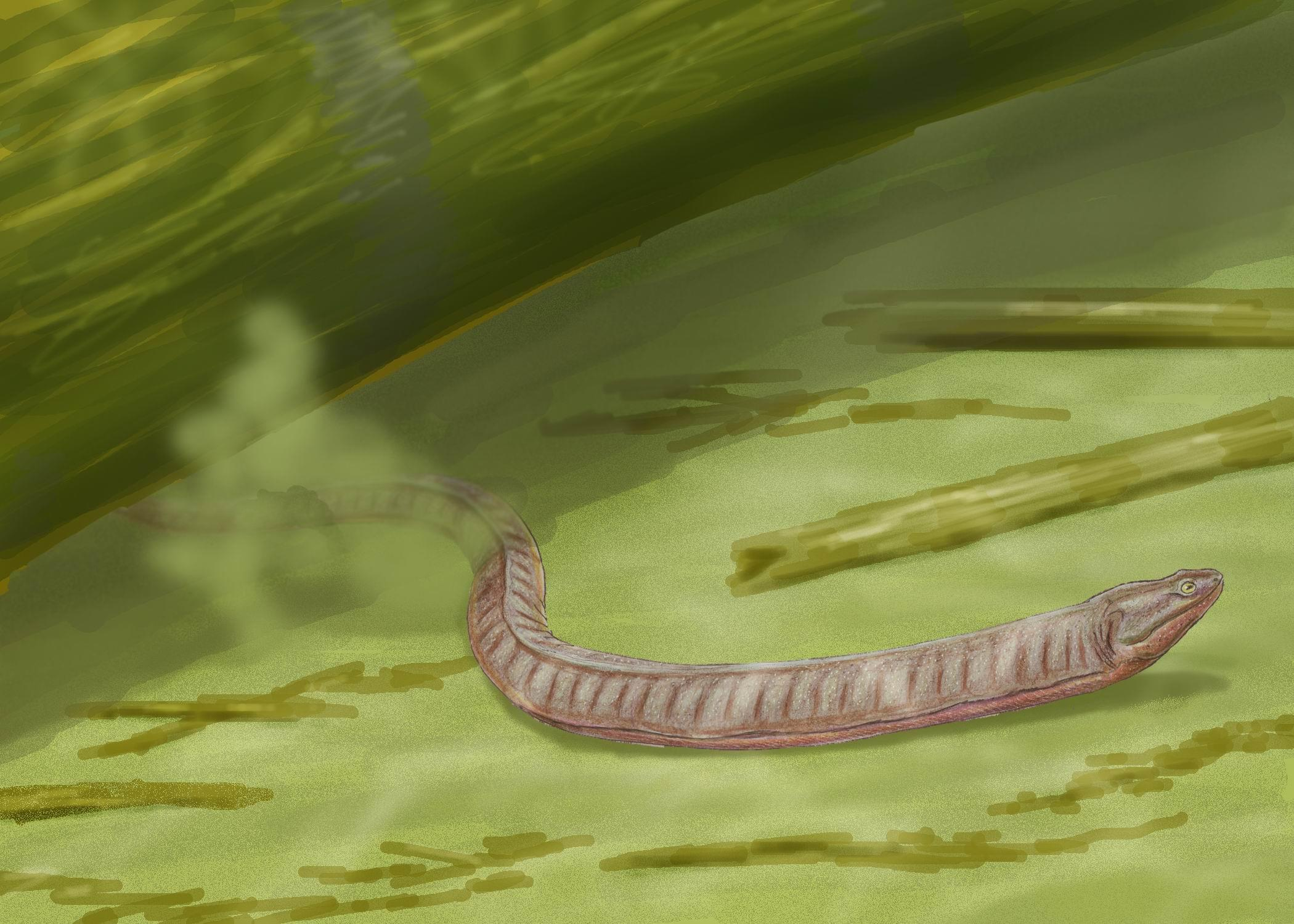
- Life restoration of Adelospondylus

Scientific classification
- Kingdom: Animalia
- Phylum: Chordata
- Clade: Stegocephali
- Order: †Adelospondyli; Watson, 1930

Families and genera
- †Acherontiscidae; †Acherontiscus; †Adelogyrinidae; †Adelogyrinus; †Adelospondylus; †Dolichopareias; †Palaeomolgophis

= Adelospondyli =

Adelospondyls Temporal range: Late Mississippian, Serpukhovian

Extinct order of amphibians

Adelospondyli is an order of elongated, presumably aquatic, Carboniferous amphibians (sensu lato). They have a robust skull roofed with solid bone, and orbits located towards the front of the skull. The limbs were almost certainly absent, although some historical sources reported them to be present. Despite the likely absence of limbs, adelospondyls retained a large part of the bony shoulder girdle. Adelospondyls have been assigned to a variety of groups in the past. They have traditionally been seen as members of the subclass Lepospondyli, related to other unusual early tetrapods such as "microsaurs", "nectrideans", and aïstopods. Analyses such as Ruta & Coates (2007), Mariscano et al. (2024), and Igielman et al. (2026) have offered an alternate classification scheme, arguing that adelospondyls are instead stem-tetrapods.

Most adelospondyls belong to the family Adelogyrinidae, and prior to 2003 the order and family were considered synonymous. In 2003, Ruta et al. assigned Acherontiscus to the order as the only known non-adelogyrinid member. Members of this group are very rare; only six known specimens can be assigned to the five known genera with absolute confidence. These specimens are known from Mississippian (Serpukhovian Age) geological deposits in Scotland, and they were among the oldest "lepospondyls" known from fossils.

== Description ==
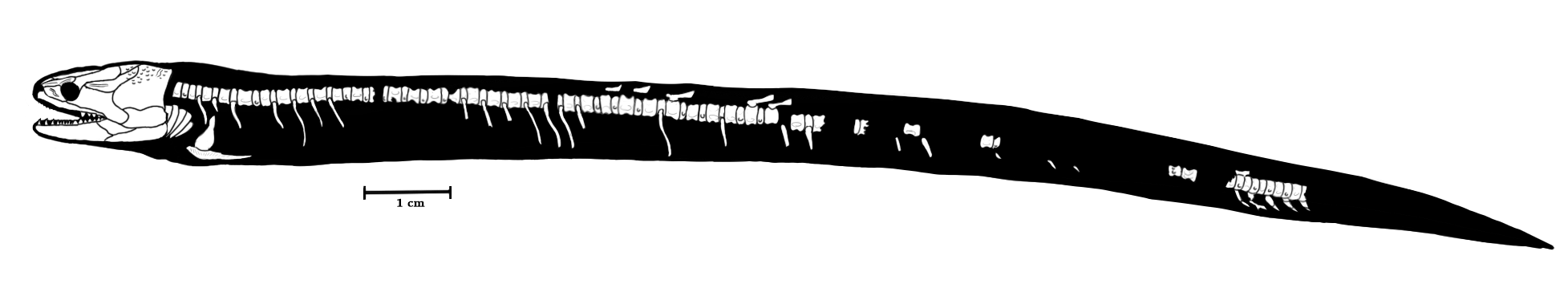
A skeletal diagram of Acherontiscus

Adelospondyls share a variety of traits with other lepospondyls, although whether these traits are an example of convergent evolution is a controversial topic. Like the aïstopods and lysorophian "microsaurs", they had very elongated bodies similar to that of snakes and eels. In addition, they lacked limbs (similarly to the aïstopods), although forelimbs were supposedly found in various adelogyrinids in the late 1960s. Andrews & Carroll (1991) found that all cases of forelimb bones in adelogyrinids were actually misinterpretations. For example, putative forelimbs discovered in Adelogyrinus and Palaeomolgophis by Brough & Brough (1967) were re-identified as hyoid bones and ribs, respectively. Carroll (1967) also claimed that forelimbs were present in Adelospondylus, but these later considered to be hyoids as in Adelogyrinus.

=== Skull ===
Adelospondyls had somewhat long and low skulls, with large orbits (eye sockets) shifted towards the front of the skull. As a result, the proportions of the skull bones were affected. For example, the nasal bones along the midline of the skull in front of the eyes were much shorter than the frontal bones directly behind them, which extended forwards past the level of the eyes. The frontal bones were omitted from the edge of the orbits (eye holes) due to a contact between the pre- and post-frontals which typically lie in front of and behind the orbits, respectively. Unlike lysorophians and aïstopods, which had snake-like skulls with large openings and reduced bone material, adelospondyl skulls were strongly built and covered with ridges, pits, and grooves, including lateral line sulci. They typically possessed many teeth, although such teeth differ in structure between families. Adelogyrinids, for example, had many numerous "chisel-shaped" teeth, while Acherontiscus had blunt teeth at the back of the mouth and sharp, thin teeth at the front. As is the case in other lepospondyls, the teeth of adelospondyls did not have a maze-like internal structure like those of "labyrinthodonts", nor did adelospondyls possess enlarged fang-like teeth on the roof of the mouth.

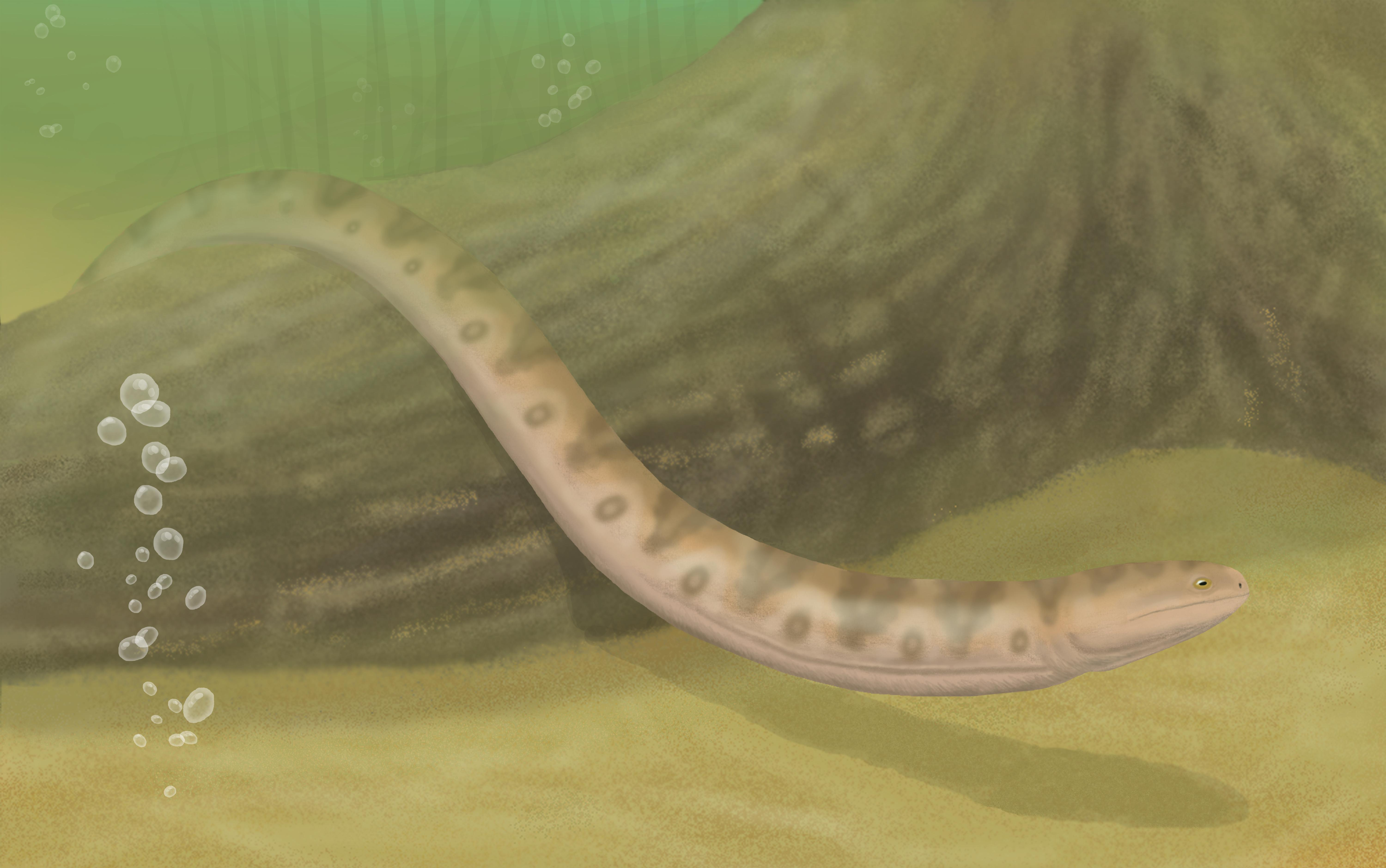
Life restoration of Palaeomolgophis

Similar to various other lepospondyls, adelospondyls lost several bones in the temporal region of the skull, which is at the back of the skull between the quadratojugal bone of the jaw joint and the parietal and postparietal bones at the midline of the skull roof. Stem- and crown-tetrapods typically have three to four bones on each side of the skull in this region (from top to bottom): the tabular, supratemporal (and sometimes an adjacent intertemporal), and squamosal. The intertemporal is lost (or fused into other bones) in a variety of unrelated tetrapod groups. The same process additionally occurs to the supratemporal in several lepospondyls, namely "microsaurs" and a few "nectrideans" such as Scincosaurus and diplocaulids. Adelospondyls take this one step further. They possess only a single bone between the jaw joint and the skull roof. This bone is often believed to be a fusion between the tabular and the squamosal (termed a "tabular-squamosal" or "squamosotabular"), although it is also conceivable that the tabular disappeared completely leaving only the enlarged squamosal in its place.

=== Postcranial bones ===
Adelospondyls can also be characterized by their vertebrae compared to other lepospondyls. They were spool-shaped and high in number, with Acherontiscus having an estimated 64 vertebrae and an indeterminate juvenile adelogyrinid having at least 70. Most of these vertebrae lack haemal spines, indicating that the primary elongation took place in the body rather than the tail. The neural spines are not fused to the centra, a characteristic which D.M.S. Watson (1929) used to characterize the adelospondyls as a distinct order. In fact, the name "adelospondyl" is Greek for "obscure vertebra", referencing both the rarity of adelospondyls and this trait. However, Watson also included Lysorophus as an adelospondyl rather than a lysorophian "microsaur", and other studies have shown that the absence of neurocentral fusion is very common among tetrapods, and therefore useless as a distinguishing feature. However, adelospondyls do have an additional quality of the vertebrae which is unique compared to other lepospondyls. In most lepospondyls, the left and right halves of each vertebra's neural arch are separate, rather than fused as in other tetrapods. Adelospondyls retain the primitive condition of the two halves being completely fused, making their vertebrae unique among lepospondyls. Acherontiscus deviates from the norm of the subclass even more than other adelospondyls, as it possessed two separate bony components of the centra, rather than a single centrum (which is the case in adelogyrinids and other lepospondyls). These two different components (the intercentrum at the front and pleurocentrum at the back) were nearly equal in size, similar to the vertebrae of embolomeres.

Although adelospondyls lost all trace of their fore- and hind-limbs, they did retain a notable remnant of their presumably limbed ancestors. This remnant is a large bony dermal shoulder girdle, comprising the plate-like interclavicle which was positioned on the midline of the chest, two clavicle bones on either side of it, and two boomerang-shaped cleithrum bones at the base of the neck. On the other hand, the bones of the endochondral shoulder girdle (i.e. the scapulae and coracoids), which supported the forelimbs, were lost along with the limbs. Adelospondyls possessed a large bony hyoid apparatus, including gill-supporting bones such as hypobranchials and ceratobranchials. Long, thin scales have been preserved in most adelospondyl specimens, and they were more abundant on the ventral (belly) side of the body rather than the dorsal (back) side.
