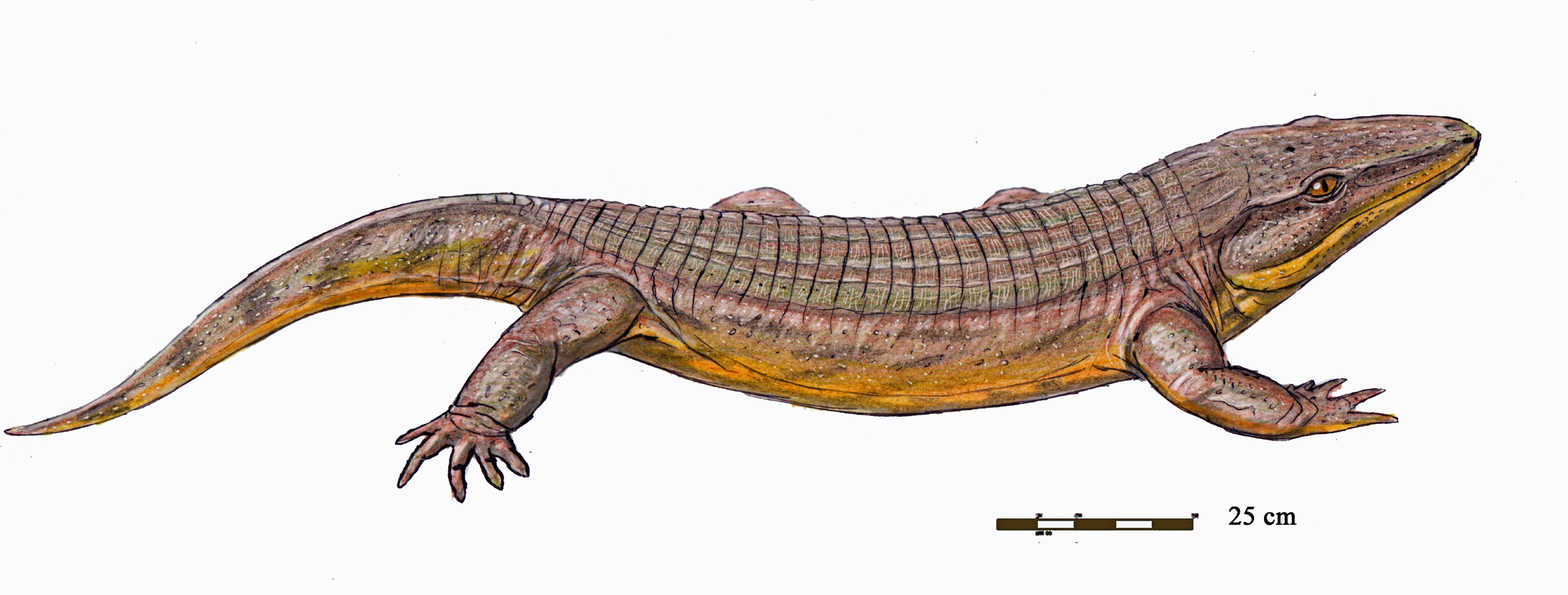
- Chroniosuchus paradoxus

Scientific classification
- Kingdom: Animalia
- Phylum: Chordata
- Clade: Reptiliomorpha (?)
- Order: †Chroniosuchia
- Family: †Chroniosuchidae
- Genus: †Chroniosuchus; Vjuschkov, 1957

Species
- †C. paradoxus Vjuschkov, 1957 (type); †C. licharevi (Riabinin, 1962)

Synonyms
- Buzulukia butsuri Vyushkov, 1957; Jugosuchus licharevi Riabinin, 1962

= Chroniosuchus =

Chroniosuchus Temporal range: Upper Permian

Extinct genus of tetrapods

Chroniosuchus (greek for “ancient crocodile”; chronos meaning “time” and suchus meaning “crocodile”) is an extinct genus of chroniosuchid from the upper Permian period. The genus was first named by Vjuschkov in 1957.

Chroniosuchus is known for its distinctive body armor of large bony plates, known as scutes, that cover its back and sides. These scutes varied among species providing clues of their evolution and classification among the Chroniosuchidae family.

== History and discovery ==
The first chroniosuchian remains were found in the early 20th century along the Malaya Severnaya Dvina River of the Russian pre-Urals and were mistakenly ascribed to Kotlassia prima by Hartmann-Weinberg (1935) and was noted to have similar anatomy based on dermal armour by Olson. However, studies by Vyushkov in the 1950s marked the recognition of chroniosuchians as their own group. Golubev revised the taxonomy of Permian chroniosuchians, recognizing the distinctive features of Chroniosuchidae and Bystrowianidae. The two major subtaxa were defined mainly on their distinct osteoderm morphologies. Golubev assigned fossils previously referred to Jugosuchus to Chroniosuchus or Chroniosaurus, creating a new genus, Jarilinus, to accommodate an intermediate species. Golubev suggested that the chroniosuchids formed a phylogenetic lineage with several successive species, and defined four biostratigraphic subzones for the Russian Late Permian.

Though multiple species have been named and debated in the genus Chroniosuchus, based on Golubev's revision, currently two Chroniosuchus species are considered valid which are C. paradoxus, discovered during the 1940s or 1950s and named by B.P. Vjuschkov in 1957, and C. licharevi named by Anatoly Riabinin in 1962.

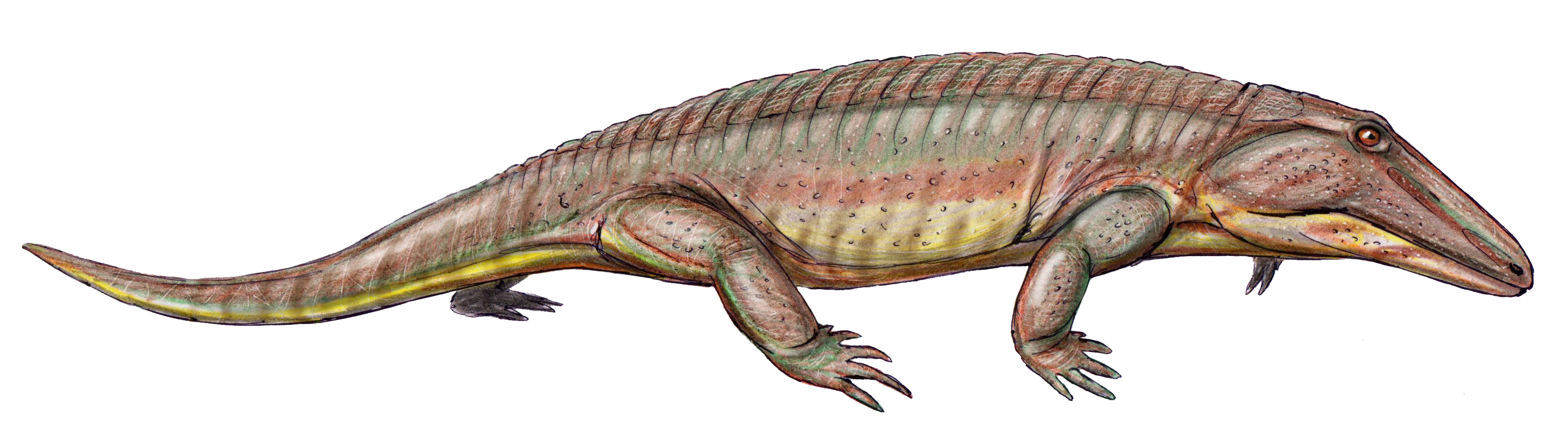
Chroniosuchus licharevi

== Classification ==
Below is the cladogram from Buchwitz et al. (2012) showing the phylogenetic relations of chroniosuchids:

- Chroniosuchia
  - Madygenerpeton
  - - Chroniosaurus dongusensis
    - - Chroniosaurus levis
      - - Suchonica
        - Jarilinus
        - Chroniosuchus
        - - Uralerpeton
          - Bystrowianidae
            - - Synesuchus
              - Bystrowiella
            - - Bystrowiana
              - - Axitectum
                - Dromotectum

== Description ==
Chroniosuchids are very uniform morphologically. Variation in dermal scutes is the main factor of differentiating between the species.

=== Dorsal armour ===
The dorsal osteoderms or armored scutes, are rectangular in shape with a semicircular anterior. The scutes have articulations and locks between them, and their terminology and minutiae are described by V.K. Golubev. The articulations with neighboring scutes are located on the ventral side, and the dorsal surface is strongly sculptured while the ventral surface of wings is smooth and contains many small openings. "The scutes have very wide wings and cover practically the whole upper part of the trunk. The tail scutes are narrower, the last of which lack wings. A long smooth strip extends about a third of the whole wing length along the posterior dorsal edge and represents the overlap area for the next wing of the scute." Chroniosuchus is noted to have pitted scutes by Golubev.

=== Skull ===
The skull was highly specialized and is characterized by a triangular shape with a short snout and large orbits. The skull had numerous fenestrae, or openings, which made it lightweight and allowed for better muscle attachment points. The lower jaw was also highly specialized and had two pairs of tusks that extended from the lower jaw. The teeth were small and pointed anteroventrally, and the palate was highly ornamented with numerous ridges and pits. It is thought that the Chroniosuchus was about 1.5m in length, and Golubev describes C. paradoxus as "small-sized".

== Paleobiology ==
Chroniosuchians were most likely semi-terrestrial predators. The most notable feature of Chroniosuchus is its heavily armored body, which was covered with bony plates called osteoderms. These osteoderms most likely provided protection against predators and may have also helped regulate body temperature.

Chroniosuchians had a broad, flat skull and a wide, powerful jaw, which suggests that it was a predator that fed on small animals, such as insects and other amphibians. It had a short, stocky body and powerful limbs, which would have allowed it to move quickly over short distances.

== Paleoecology ==
Based on its anatomy and the paleoenvironmental context of its fossils, it is believed that Chroniosuchus lived primarily on land. Chroniosuchus most likely spent some time in freshwater environments, but its heavily armored body and robust limbs suggest that it was better adapted for terrestrial life. In addition, the location of Chroniosuchus fossils in terrestrial deposits supports the idea that it primarily lived on land. It is likely that Chroniosuchus spent most of its time near the edges of rivers or other bodies of water, where it could find prey and water when necessary.
