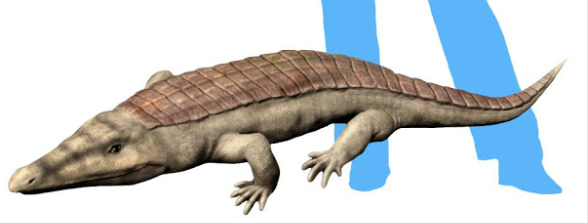
- Life restoration of Laosuchus naga

Scientific classification
- Kingdom: Animalia
- Phylum: Chordata
- Order: †Chroniosuchia
- Genus: †Laosuchus; Arbez, Sidor & Steyer, 2018

Type species
- Laosuchus naga Arbez, Sidor & Steyer, 2018

Other species
- L. hun Liu & Chen, 2021

= Laosuchus =

Laosuchus Temporal range: Late Permian-Early Triassic, 252.4–249.6 Ma

Extinct genus of tetrapods

Laosuchus is an extinct genus of chroniosuchian known from the Permian-Triassic boundary of Asia. Two species have been named.

== Discovery ==
L. naga was found in the Luang Prabang Basin of Northern Laos, part of the Indochina block. The site was first discovered by J. B. H. Counillon in 1896 as part of the Pavie's third Mission. Counillon was tasked with mapping mineral resources for the French colonial empire. L. naga was discovered during a 2005 expedition to the area, along with remains of dicynodonts. It was later described by Arbez, Sidor, and Steyer in 2018. Its name comes from the Nāga, a snake-like deity that appears in multiple east Asian religions. In 2021 a new species L. hun was described from the Naobaogou Formation of the Daqing Mountains of Inner Mongolia, China.

== Description ==
Laosuchus naga is represented by a single skull and articulated left hemimandible designated as specimen MDS-LPQ 2005-09, stored at the Musée des Dinosaures in Savannakhet. The skull, roughly 26 centimeters in length, is similar in shape to that of crocodiles. Its long snout bore marginal labyrinthodont teeth with an average height of 9 millimeters. Its nares are similar in shape to Madygenerpeton pustulatus. Like M. pustulatus, it also has oval-shaped orbits that are raised above the skull roof, but the orbits are proportionally smaller. Its choanae are relatively long compared to other chroniosuchians.

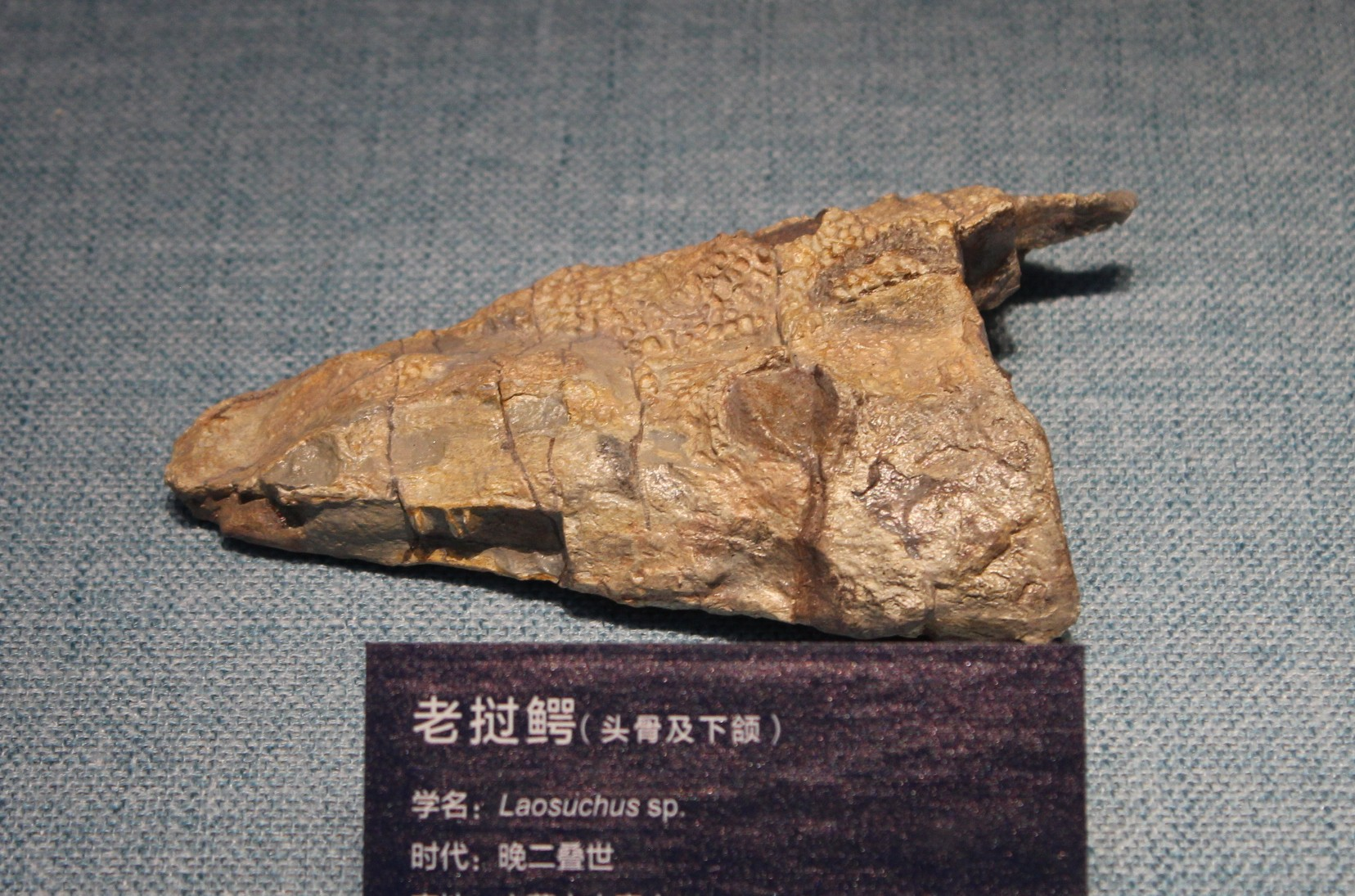
Skull of L. sp. at the Baoding Natural History Museum

L. naga has a number of traits that make it unique among chroniosuchia. It lacks palatal tusks, bearing only small denticles on the palate. Its pineal foramen is significantly reduced with a 1mm diameter(M. pustulatus, C. dongusensis, and B. schumanni have diameters of 2mm, 2.5mm, and 3.5mm respectively). A transverse flange extends from the pterygoid, contacting the maxilla. CT-scanning revealed an autapomorphic internal crest on the dorsal palate that follows the internal margin of the choanae. The parasphenoid bears a thin ventro-medial ridge, a condition also seen in Discosauriscus austriacus Its tabular horn and posterior squamosal contact, closing the otic notch.

There are a number of traits that L. naga share with other chroniosuchians. It bears a subtriangular fontanelle on its premaxilla, a poorly ossified braincase, a well developed pterygoid flange, and a relatively narrow parasphenoid bearing a crest between the basicranial joint.

CT-scanning also revealed the presence of canals within the mandible, snout, and bones in front of the orbit. The canals in the skull roof are interpreted as being related to a lateral line system. Canals in the tip of the snout and mandible are more complex and could be neurovascular canals, which modern animals use for thermoreception, electroreception, or mechanoreception. The paleontologists who described L. naga suggest that the lateral line system was used to detect prey beneath the water surface while the neurovascular system could let it detect movement at the water surface similar to modern crocodiles.

L. hun is distinguished from L. naga by several traits, including reduced palatal dentition, with a few denticles present on the vomer and pterygoid bones, and an irregular posterior cheek margin.

== Classification ==
The two families within chroniosuchia, Chroniosuchidae and Bystrowianidae, are differentiated primarily based on postcranial elements, such as the shape of their vertebrae and the degree of overlap between their dorsal osteoderms. Thus, while L. naga has numerous characteristics supporting its inclusion to chroniosuchia, the lack of postcranial elements in addition to several cranial traits preclude their inclusion to either family. As a result, L. naga was classified as Chroniosuchia incertae sedis. In the 2021 description of L. hun postcranial remains indicated that Laosuchus belonged to the Chroniosuchidae.

== Paleoecology ==
The depositional environment that L. naga occurred in consisted of braided rivers transitioning into alluvial plains, with an input of volcanic sediment. In addition to this, the presence of a lateral line system and poorly ossified braincase imply that L. naga spent much of its time in the water. According to the paleontologists who described L. naga, Its placement in nonmarine sediment provides a line of support for the scenario that the North China Block, South China Block, and Indochina block were connected like a peninsula and linked to Laurussia during the Permian and Triassic.
