= Jiyuanitectum =

Jiyuanitectum Temporal range: Late Permian

Scientific classification
- Domain: Eukaryota
- Kingdom: Animalia
- Phylum: Chordata
- Order: †Chroniosuchia
- Family: †Bystrowianidae
- Genus: †Jiyuanitectum; Liu et al., 2014

Type species
- †Jiyuanitectum flatum Liu et al., 2014

Extinct genus of tetrapodomorphs

Jiyuanitectum is an extinct genus of chroniosuchian tetrapod from the Late Permian Shangshihezi Formation of China. It is known from a single bony scute from Jiyuan in Henan province, ascribed to the type species Jiyuanitectum flatum in 2014. Plate-like scutes, which formed armor-like coverings on the backs of chroniosuchians, are the most commonly found chroniosuchian remains. They are also the most informative when it comes to distinguishing between species due to small variations in scute anatomy between different taxa. For example, a shallow groove along the midline of the scute is unique to Jiyuanitectum. The flatness of the scute is another unusual characteristic, giving it the species name flatum. Jiyuanitectum shares several features in common with the chroniosuchians Synesuchus and Bystrowiella, including the upper surface of the scute being covered in ridges that are mostly oriented perpendicular to the midline, and the absence of a bony projection on the front of the scute called the anteromedial articular processes, which is seen in other chroniosuchians. These features suggest that Jiyuanitectum belongs to the family Bystrowianidae. The narrowness of the scute suggests that it may be one of the most basal members of the group.

The scute of Jiyuanitectum was found within a diverse Late Permian fossil assemblage in Jiyuan that includes abundant remains of the pareiasaur Shihtienfenia as well as fossils of two other chroniosuchian species: Bystrowiana sinica and Dromotectum largum. Therapsid remains are also known from the assemblage.
