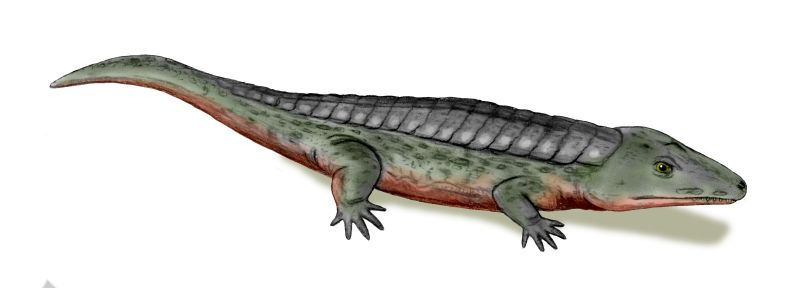
- Chroniosuchus

Scientific classification
- Domain: Eukaryota
- Kingdom: Animalia
- Phylum: Chordata
- Order: †Chroniosuchia
- Family: †Chroniosuchidae; Vjuschkov, 1957

Genera
- Chroniosaurus; Chroniosuchus; Ingentidens; Jarilinus; Madygenerpeton; Phratochronis; Uralerpeton; Suchonica

= Chroniosuchidae =

Chroniosuchidae Temporal range: Upper Permian–Upper Triassic

Extinct family of tetrapodomorphs

Chroniosuchidae is a family of semi-aquatic tetrapods found in sediments from the upper Permian and the upper Triassic periods, most in Russia. They were generally rather large animals, with long jaws similar to those found in modern crocodiles, and probably lived a similar lifestyle as riverside piscivores and ambush predators. Like all chroniosuchians, they bore extensive osteoderm armour on their backs, possibly as protection against terrestrial predators such as the Permian therapsids and the Triassic rauisuchians.

== Phylogeny ==
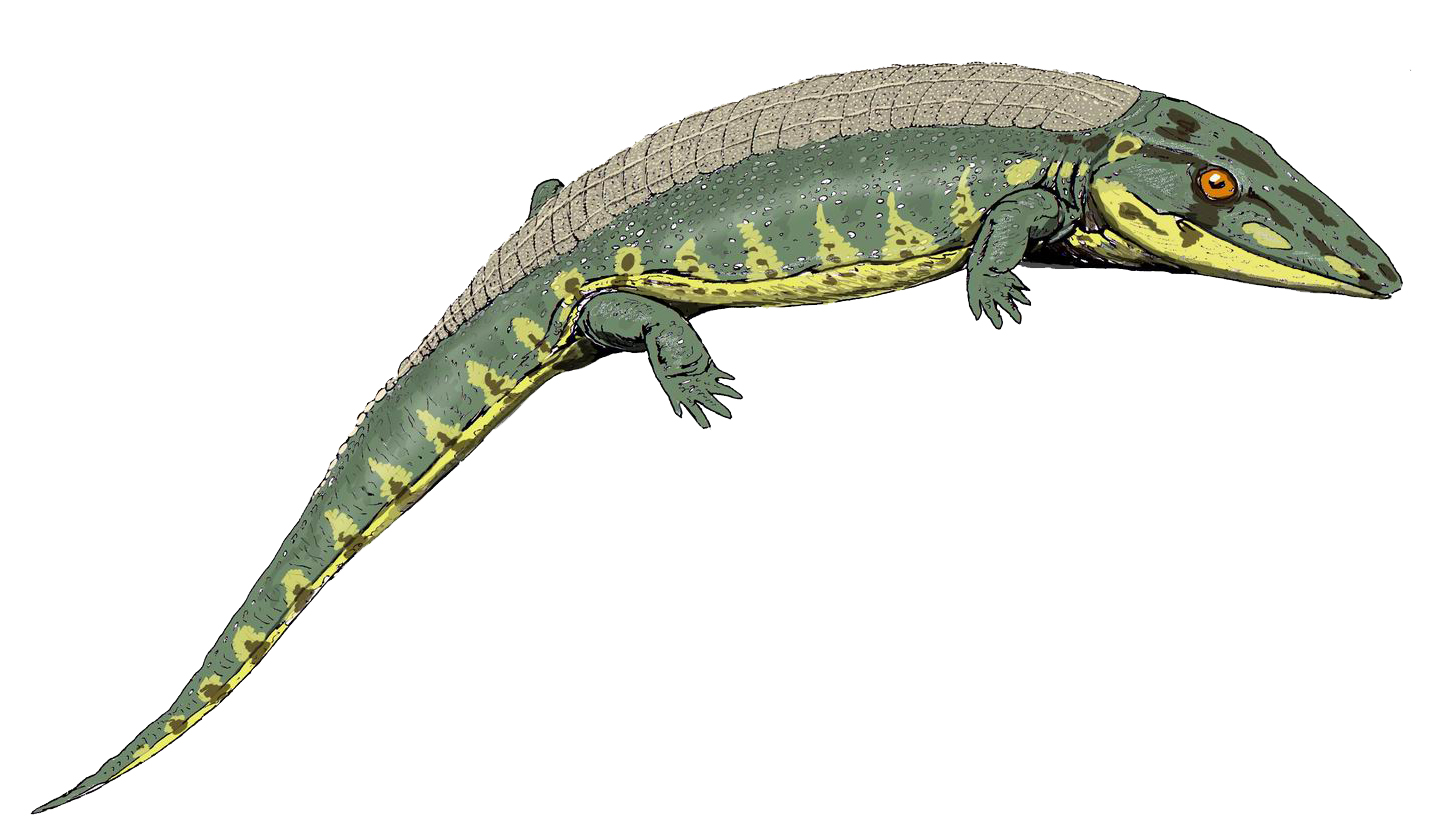
Chroniosaurus dongusensis

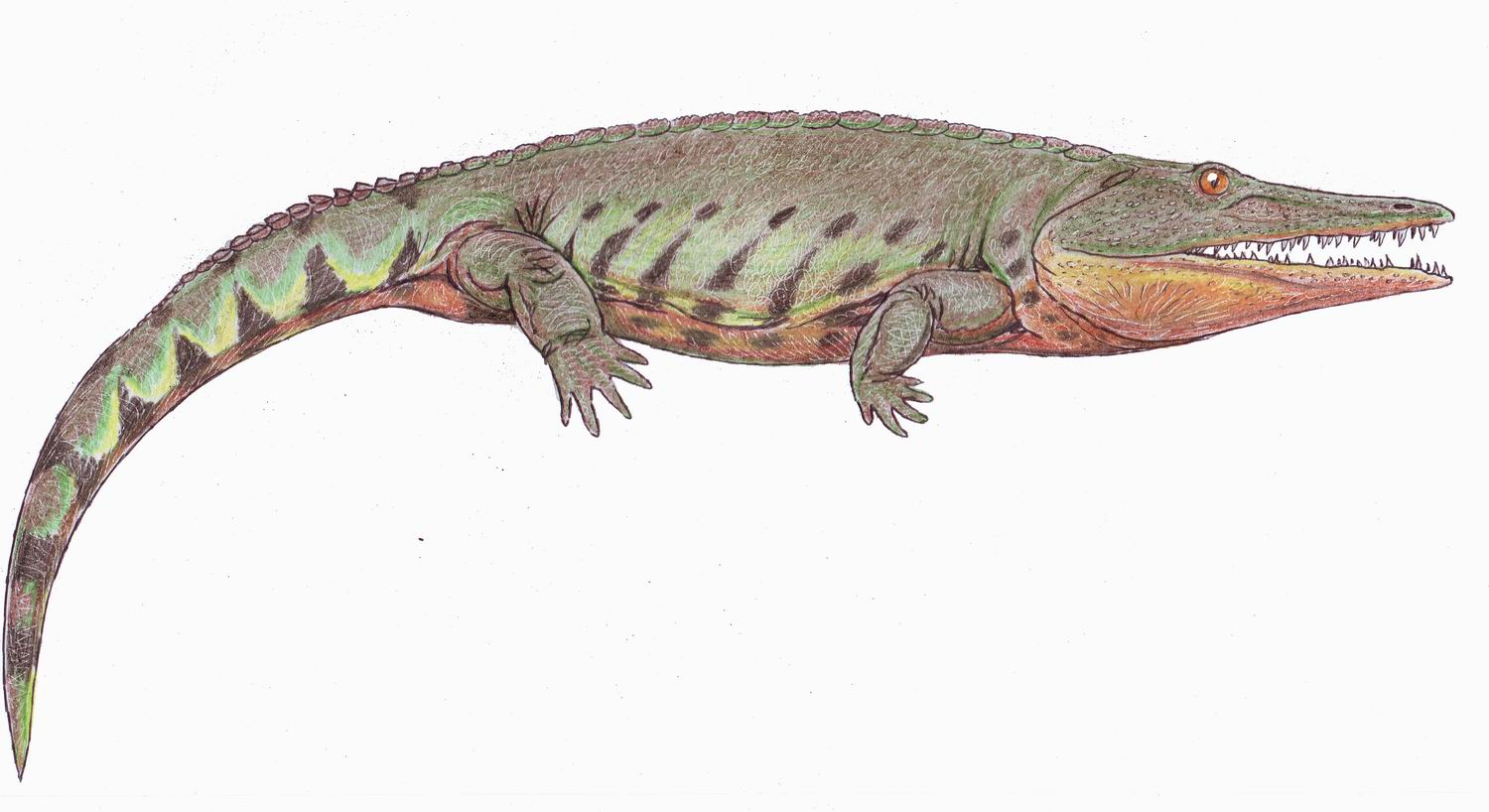
Uralerpeton tverdokhlebovae

Below is the cladogram from Buchwitz et al. (2012) showing the phylogenetic relations of chroniosuchids:

- Chroniosuchia
  - Madygenerpeton
  - - Chroniosaurus dongusensis
    - - Chroniosaurus levis
      - - Suchonica
        - Jarilinus
        - Chroniosuchus
        - - Uralerpeton
          - Bystrowianidae
            - - Synesuchus
              - Bystrowiella
            - - Bystrowiana
              - - Axitectum
                - Dromotectum

== See also ==
- Permian tetrapods
