= Bystrov =

Bystrov, Bystrow or Bistrov (Russian: Быстро́в) is a Russian male surname. Its feminine counterpart is Bystrova, Bistrova or Bystrowa. The surname is derived from the word быстрый (bystry, meaning "quick") and may refer to:

- Alexey Bystrow (1899–1959), Russian paleontologist, anatomist, and histologist
- Dmitri Bystrov (1967–2005), Russian footballer
- Galina Bystrova (1934–1999), Soviet athlete who competed mainly in the pentathlon
- Mikhail Bystrov Head of Russian "troll farm" Internet Research Agency
- Nataliya Bystrova (born 1947), Soviet Olympic swimmer
- Nina Bystrova (1944–2011), Soviet rower
- Pyotr Bystrov (born 1979), Russian footballer
- Vladimir Bystrov (born 1984), Russian footballer
- Vladimír Bystrov (1935–2010), Czech journalist, film critic, commentator and translator

== See also ==
- Cape Bystrova
- Bistroff
