= Qingtoushan Formation =

Geologic formation in Gansu, China

- Stratigraphic range: Middle Permian, Roadian
- Type: Geological formation
- Underlies: Sunan Formation
- Overlies: Yaogou Formation
- Thickness: Over 300 metres

Lithology
- Primary: Sandstone
- Other: Mudstone

Location
- Region: Gansu
- Country: China
- Extent: Qilian Mountains

Type section
- Named by: Liu et al
- Year defined: 2012

The Qingtoushan Formation is a Middle Permian-age geologic formation in the Qilian Mountains of Gansu, China. It is known for its diverse tetrapod fauna known as the Dashankou fauna, which likely dates to the Roadian, and includes some of the oldest known therapsids. This formation was previously erroneously named as the Xidagou Formation, a name which applies to otherwise Triassic strata in the northern Qillian Mountains. The formation is over 300 metres thick, and primarily consists of purple-red coarse sandstones, with minor purple mudstone.

== Paleobiota ==
Color key: Taxon / Reclassified taxon / Taxon falsely reported as present / Dubious taxon or junior synonym / Ichnotaxon / Ootaxon / Morphotaxon	Notes; Uncertain or tentative taxa are in small text; ~~crossed out~~ taxa are discredited.

=== Synapsida ===
Genus	Species	Location	Stratigraphic position	Material	Notes	Images
Biseridens	B. qilianicus			A well-preserved skull	An anomodont	
Sinophoneus	S. yumenensis			A single skull (GMV 1601)	An anteosaurid dinocephalian	
Stenocybus	S. acidentatus			A skull (IGCAGS V 361) and fragmentary jaw bones	Jr. synonym of Sinophoneus yumenensis	
Raranimus	R. dashankouensis	Dashankou locality		A partial skull	A basal therapsid	

=== Other Tetrapoda ===
Genus	Species	Location	Stratigraphic position	Material	Notes	Images
Anakamacops	A. petrolicus				A dissorophid temnospondyl	
Belebey	B. zhengi				A bolosaurid stem-reptile	
Gansurhinus	G. qingtoushanensis				A captorhinid	
Ingentidens	I. corridoricus				A chroniosuchid chroniosuchian	
Phratochronis	P. qilianensis				A chroniosuchid chroniosuchian	
Yumenerpeton	Y. yangi				A bystrowianid chroniosuchian	
