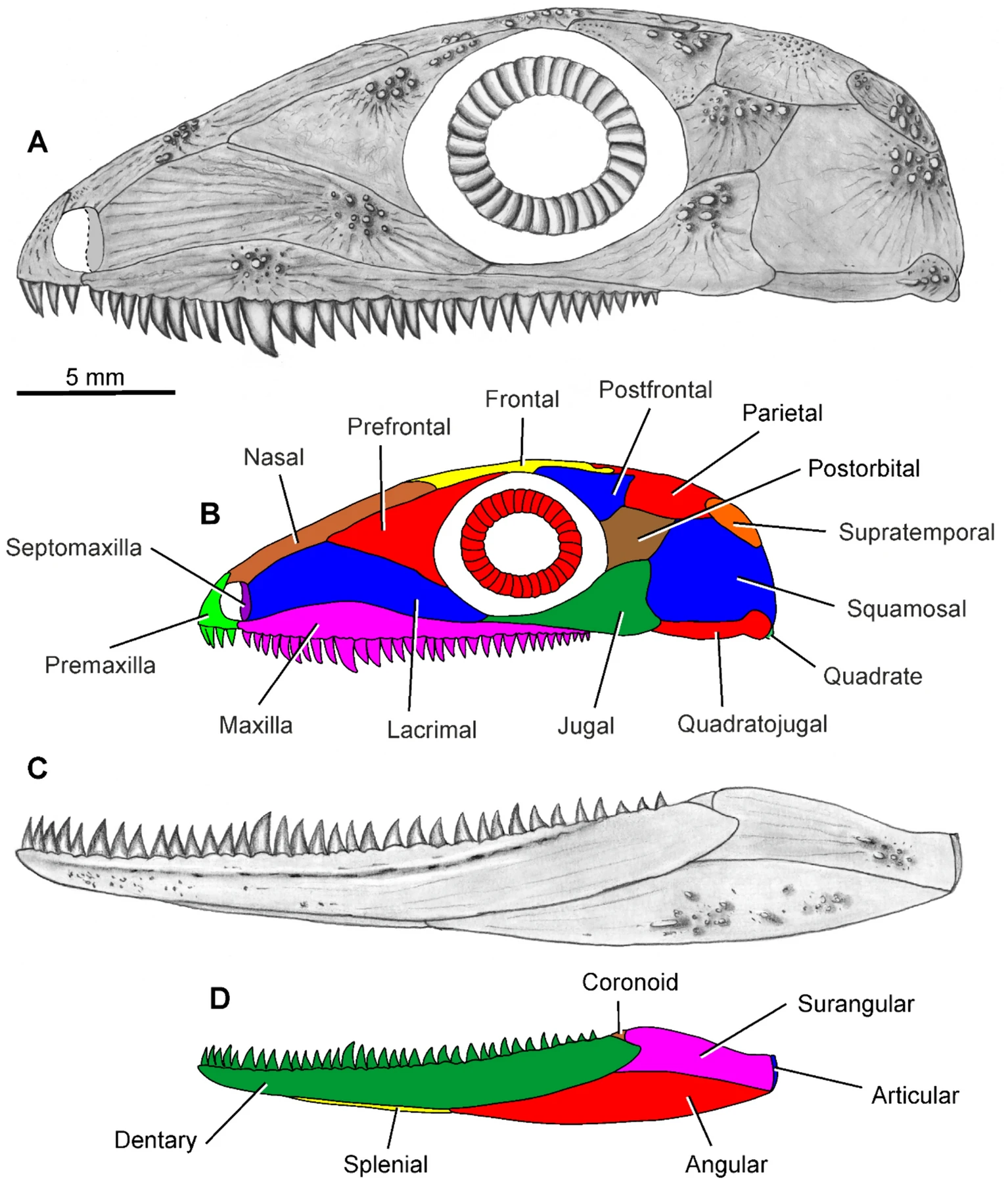
- Skull reconstruction

Scientific classification
- Kingdom: Animalia
- Phylum: Chordata
- Clade: Reptiliomorpha
- Genus: †Brouffia; Carroll & Baird, 1972
- Species: †B. orientalis

Binomial name
- †Brouffia orientalis Carroll & Baird, 1972

= Brouffia =

Brouffia Temporal range: Late Carboniferous, 307.1–305 Ma

Extinct genus of tetrapods

Brouffia is an extinct genus of Late Carboniferous (late Westphalian stage) basal reptiliomorphs known from Plzeň of Czech Republic. It is known from a single partial skeleton, the holotype ČGH III B.21.C.587 and MP 451 (part and counterpart). It was collected in the Nýřany site from the Nýřany Member of the Kladno Formation. It was first named by Robert L. Carroll and Donald Baird in 1972 and the type species is Brouffia orientalis. Initially regarded as a reptile, subsequent research has suggested affinities with non-amniote tetrapods, closely related to Coelostegus.

== Phylogeny ==
Cladogram after Xavier A. Jenkins and colleagues, 2026^{supplementary figure S3}

- Tetrapoda
  - Temnospondyli
  - Reptiliomorpha (Pan‑Amniota)
    - - †Gephyrostegus
      - - †Lanthanosuchus
        - †Chroniosaurus (Chroniosuchia)
    - - †Seymouria (Seymouriamorpha)
      - - - †Brouffia
          - †Coelostegus
        - - †Recumbirostra
          - - †Hylonomus
            - - - †Diadectomorpha
                - †Captorhinidae
              - - †Protorothyrididae
                - Amniota
                  - Synapsida
                  - Sauropsida
