= Poldarsa (settlement) =

Poldarsa Полдарса
- Settlement
- Location within Vologda Oblast Location within Russia
- Coordinates: 60°35′N 45°23′E
- Country: Russia
- Region: Vologda Oblast
- District: Velikoustyugsky District
- Time zone: UTC+3:00

Poldarsa (Russian: Полдарса) is a rural locality (a settlement) and the administrative center of Opokskoye Rural Settlement, Velikoustyugsky District, Vologda Oblast, Russia. The population was 1,447 as of 2002. There are 23 streets.

== Geography ==
Poldarsa is located 66 km southwest of Veliky Ustyug (the district's administrative centre) by road. Poldarsa (village) is the nearest rural locality.

== Paleontology ==
A Late Permian (Severodvinian stage) outcrop with numerous fossils is located on the floodplain of the left bank of the Sukhona river, in front of eastern part of Poldarsa. Numerous ostracod and bivalve shells, bones and coprolites of fishes and chroniosuchid Suchonica vladimiri were collected from these deposits. Due to the presence of chroniosuchids, this locality was assigned to Kotelnichsky subcomplex.
