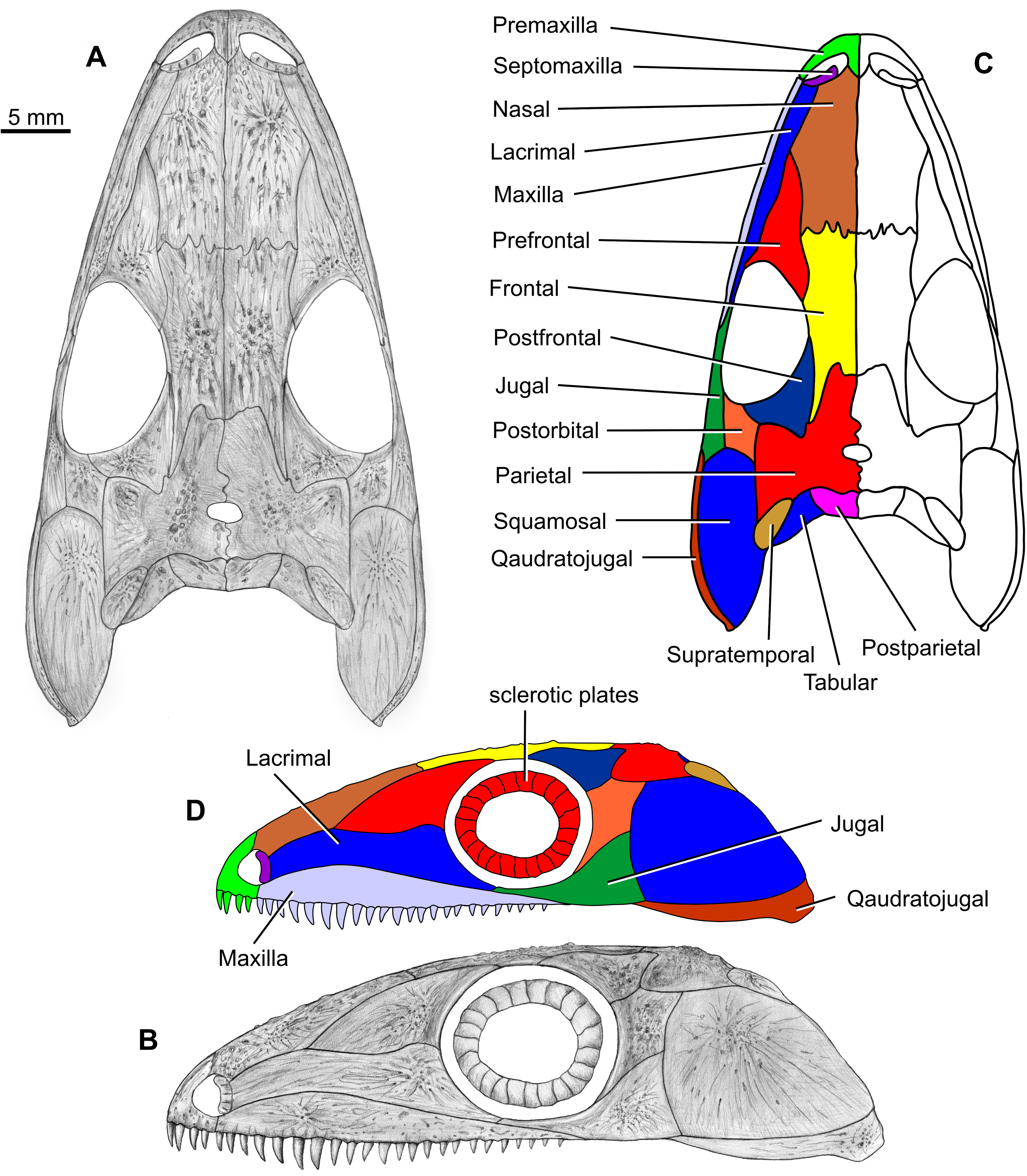
- Skull reconstruction

Scientific classification
- Kingdom: Animalia
- Phylum: Chordata
- Clade: Reptiliomorpha
- Genus: †Coelostegus; Carroll & Baird, 1972
- Species: †C. prothales

Binomial name
- †Coelostegus prothales Carroll & Baird, 1972

= Coelostegus =

Coelostegus Temporal range: Late Carboniferous, 307.1–305 Ma

Extinct genus of reptiles

Coelostegus is an extinct genus of Late Carboniferous (late Westphalian stage) basal reptiliomorph known from Plzeň of Czech Republic. It is known from the holotype ČGH 3027, a partial skeleton of an immature individual. It was collected in the Nýřany site from the Nýřany Member of the Kladno Formation. It was first named by Robert L. Carroll and Donald Baird in 1972 and the type species is Coelostegus prothales. Initially regarded as a reptile, subsequent research has suggested affinities with non-amniote tetrapods, closely related to Brouffia.

== Phylogeny ==
Cladogram after Xavier A. Jenkins and colleagues, 2026

- Tetrapoda
  - Temnospondyli
  - Reptiliomorpha (Pan‑Amniota)
    - - †Gephyrostegus
      - - †Lanthanosuchus
        - †Chroniosaurus (Chroniosuchia)
    - - †Seymouria (Seymouriamorpha)
      - - - †Brouffia
          - †Coelostegus
        - - †Recumbirostra
          - - †Hylonomus
            - - - †Diadectomorpha
                - †Captorhinidae
              - - †Protorothyrididae
                - Amniota
                  - Synapsida
                  - Sauropsida
