= Yumenerpeton =

Scientific classification
- Domain: Eukaryota
- Kingdom: Animalia
- Phylum: Chordata
- Order: †Chroniosuchia
- Family: †Bystrowianidae
- Genus: †Yumenerpeton; Jiang et al., 2017
- Species: †Y. yangi

Binomial name
- †Yumenerpeton yangi Jiang et al., 2017

Extinct genus of chordates

Yumenerpeton is an extinct genus of bystrowianid chroniosuchian discovered in the Qingtoushan Formation in Yumen City, Gansu Province, China.

Yumenerpeton is known from two specimens, GS-DSK-16, the holotype specimen, consisting of a near complete sacral vertebrae with a dermal scute, and GS-DSK-17, a pair of articulated dorsal vertebrae with scutes. The holotype specimen is notable in that it consists of, to date, the only known preserved sacral vertebrae of a bystrowianid (2017). The discovery of Yumenerpeton is significant evidence for the presence of chroniosuchians being present as early as the Middle Permian in China, as well as displaying features such as pectinate scutes previously unknown to exist in bystrowianids.

The genus is possessed of a single species, Yumenerpeton yangi. The species name honors the vertebrate paleontologist Yang Zhongjian.
