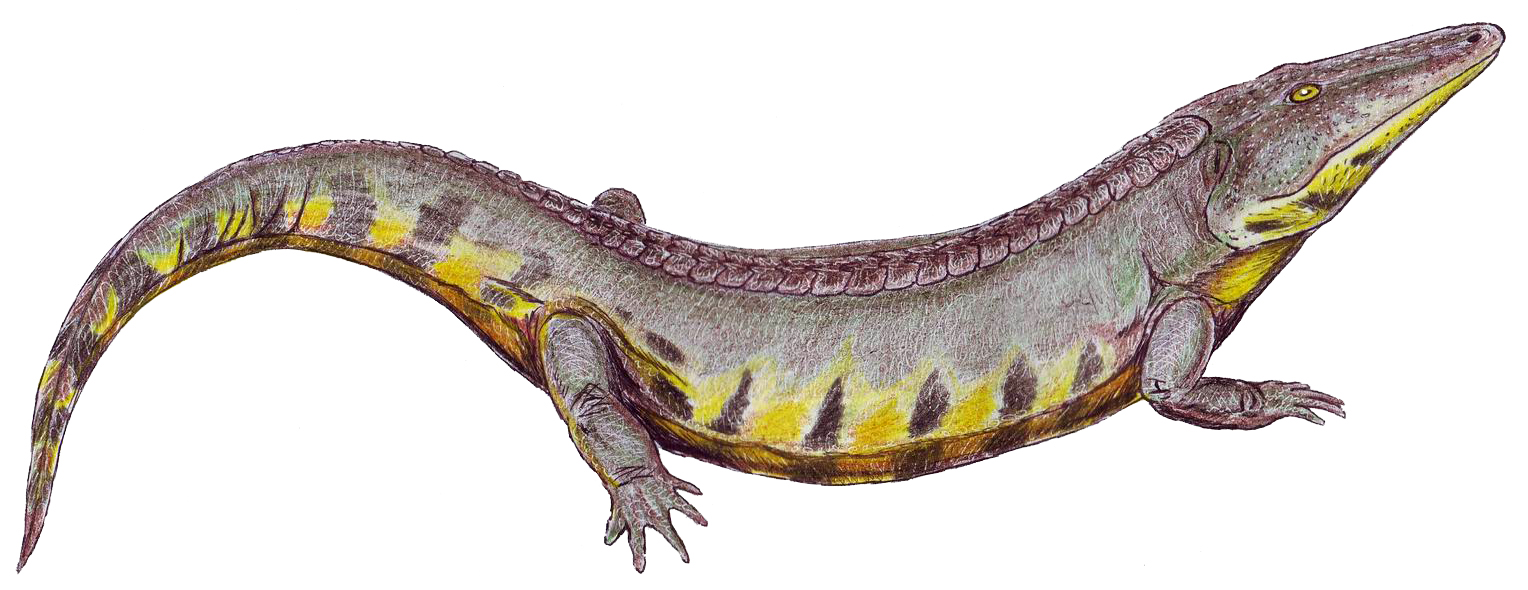
- Life restoration of Bystrowiana permira

Scientific classification
- Domain: Eukaryota
- Kingdom: Animalia
- Phylum: Chordata
- Order: †Chroniosuchia
- Family: †Bystrowianidae; Vyushkov, 1957

Subgroups
- Axitectum; Bystrowiella; Bystrowiana; Dromotectum; Hassiacoscutum; Jiyuanitectum; Synesuchus

= Bystrowianidae =

Bystrowianidae Temporal range: Late Permian - Middle Triassic

Extinct family of tetrapodomorphs

Bystrowianidae is a family of chroniosuchian tetrapods from the Permian and Triassic periods.

== Phylogeny ==
Below is the cladogram from Buchwitz et al. (2012) showing the phylogenetic relations of bystrowianids:

- Chroniosuchia
  - Madygenerpeton
  - - Chroniosaurus dongusensis
    - - Chroniosaurus levis
      - - Suchonica
        - Jarilinus
        - Chroniosuchus
        - - Uralerpeton
          - Bystrowianidae
            - - Synesuchus
              - Bystrowiella
            - - Bystrowiana
              - - Axitectum
                - Dromotectum

Cladogram from Novikov (2018) showing internal relationships of bystrowianids based on differences in their osteoderms:

- Bystrowianidae
  - - Dromotectinae
    - Axitectinae
  - Bystrowianinae
    - - Bystrowiella
      - Synesuchus
    - - Vyushkoviana
      - Bystrowiana
