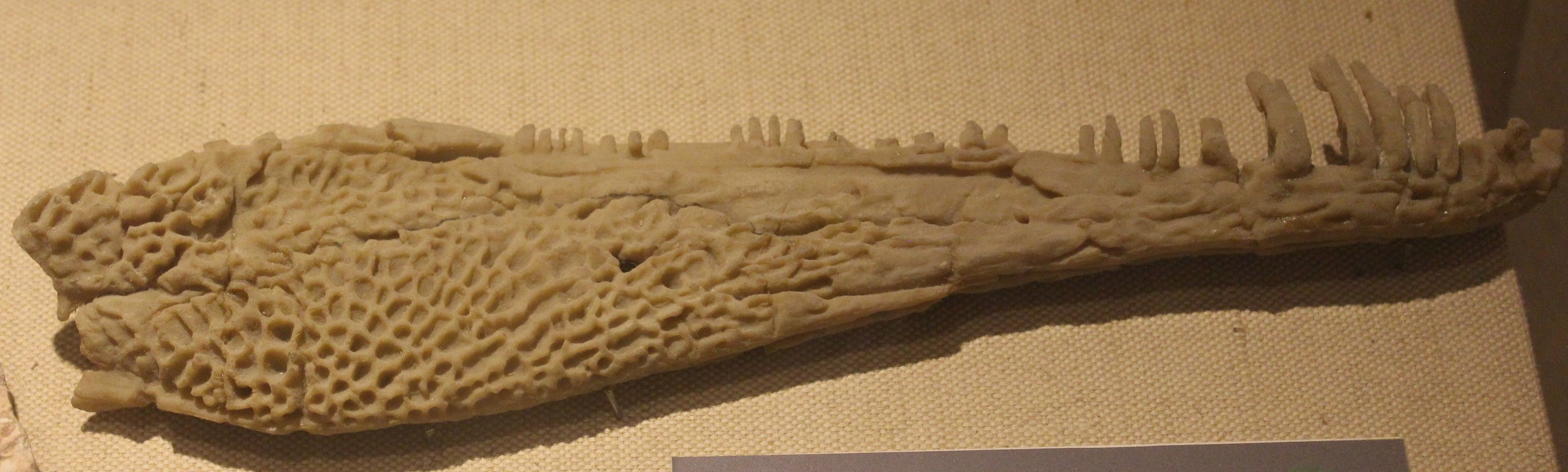
- Type jaw, Paleozoological Museum of China

Scientific classification
- Domain: Eukaryota
- Kingdom: Animalia
- Phylum: Chordata
- Clade: Reptiliomorpha (?)
- Order: †Chroniosuchia
- Family: †Chroniosuchidae
- Genus: †Ingentidens; Li & Cheng, 1999

Species
- †I. corridoricus Li & Cheng, 1999 (type)

= Ingentidens =

Ingentidens Temporal range: Upper Permian, Roadian

Extinct genus of tetrapodomorphs

Ingentidens is an extinct genus of chroniosuchid reptiliomorph from upper Permian (upper Roadian age) mudstone deposits of Dashankou locality, Xidagou Formation of China. It was first named by Jin-Ling Li and Zheng-Wu Cheng in 1999, from a mandible (IGCAGS V 363). The type species is Ingentidens corridoricus. The generic name means “large” (Inget in Latin) + “tooth” (dens), and the specific name referring to the region of Gansu, the Hexi Corridor where the type specimen was found.
