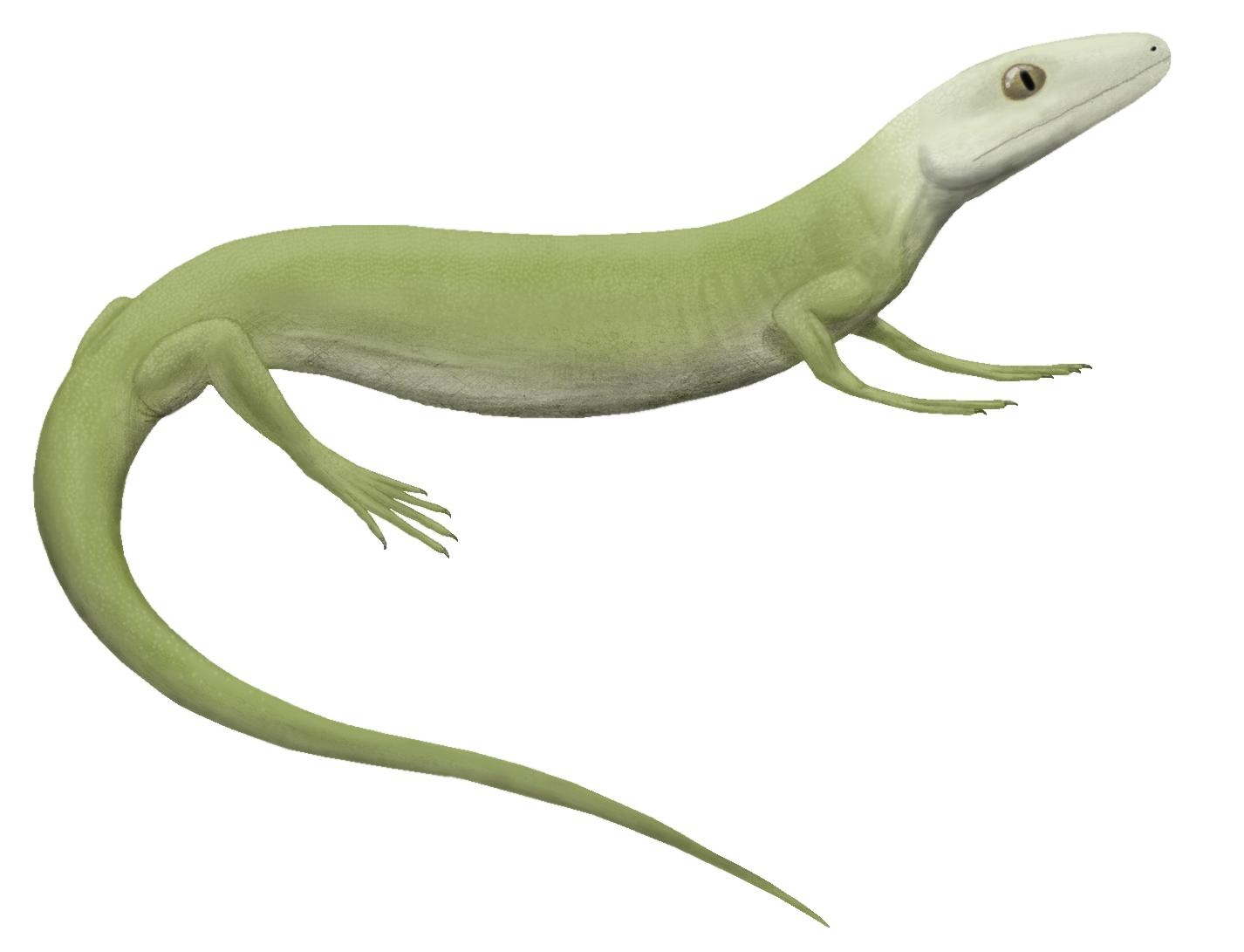
- Life restoration of Protorothyris

Scientific classification
- Kingdom: Animalia
- Phylum: Chordata
- Clade: Reptiliomorpha
- Family: †Protorothyrididae; Price, 1937

Type species
- †Protorothyris archeri Price, 1937

Groups included
- Anthracodromeus; Brouffia; Cephalerpeton; Coelostegus; Hylonomus; Paleothyris; Protorothyris

Cladistically included but traditionally excluded taxa
- Romeriida; Captorhinidae; Hylonomus; Coelostegus; Brouffia

= Protorothyrididae =

Protorothyrididae Temporal range: Pennsylvanian–Asselian, 307.1–294.6 Ma

Family of reptiles

Skull of Paleothyris

Protorothyrididae is an extinct proposed family of small, lizard-like reptiliomorphs traditionally thought to be early members of "Eureptilia". Their skulls did not have the fenestrae seen in the more derived diapsids. Protorothyridids lived from the late Carboniferous to early Permian periods, in what is now North America.

Many genera of primitive reptiles were thought to be protorothyridids. Brouffia, Coelostegus, Paleothyris and Hylonomus, for example, were found to be more basal "eureptiles" in Muller and Reisz (2006), making the family as historically defined paraphyletic, though three genera, Protorothyris, Anthracodromeus, and Cephalerpeton, were recovered as a monophyletic group. Anthracodromeus, Paleothyris, and Protorothyris were recovered as a monophyletic group in Ford and Benson (2020) (who did not sample Cephalerpeton), who recovered them as more derived than captorhinids and Hylonomus, but less so than araeoscelidians. Other studies have found even these three genera to not form a monophyletic group. Anthracodromeus is the earliest known reptile to display adaptations to climbing. While historically considered "eureptiles", this taxonomic position has been challenged by recent phylogenetic studies during the 2020s. Some phylogenetic studies, such as Kelsey M. Jenkins et al. (2025) still recover protorothyridids as basal reptiles, however, some phylogenetic studies such as those of Simões et al. (2022) and Xavier A. Jenkins et al. (2025) recover them as stem-amniotes instead.
