= Phratochronis =

Phratochronis Temporal range: Upper Permian, Roadian

Scientific classification
- Domain: Eukaryota
- Kingdom: Animalia
- Phylum: Chordata
- Clade: Reptiliomorpha (?)
- Order: †Chroniosuchia
- Family: †Chroniosuchidae
- Genus: †Phratochronis; Li & Cheng, 1999

Species
- †P. qilianensis Li & Cheng, 1999 (type)

Extinct genus of tetrapodomorphs

Phratochronis is an extinct genus of chroniosuchid reptiliomorph from upper Permian (upper Roadian age) mudstone deposits of Dashankou locality, Xidagou Formation of China. It was first named by Jin-Ling Li and Zheng-Wu Cheng in 1999, from a maxilla and premaxilla with almost complete dentition (IGCAGS V 364). The type species is Phratochronis qilianensis. The generic name means “brothers of a clan” (Phrat in Greek) + “late” (chroni) in reference to its taxonomic position, and the specific name referring to the chain of mountains where the type specimen was found.
