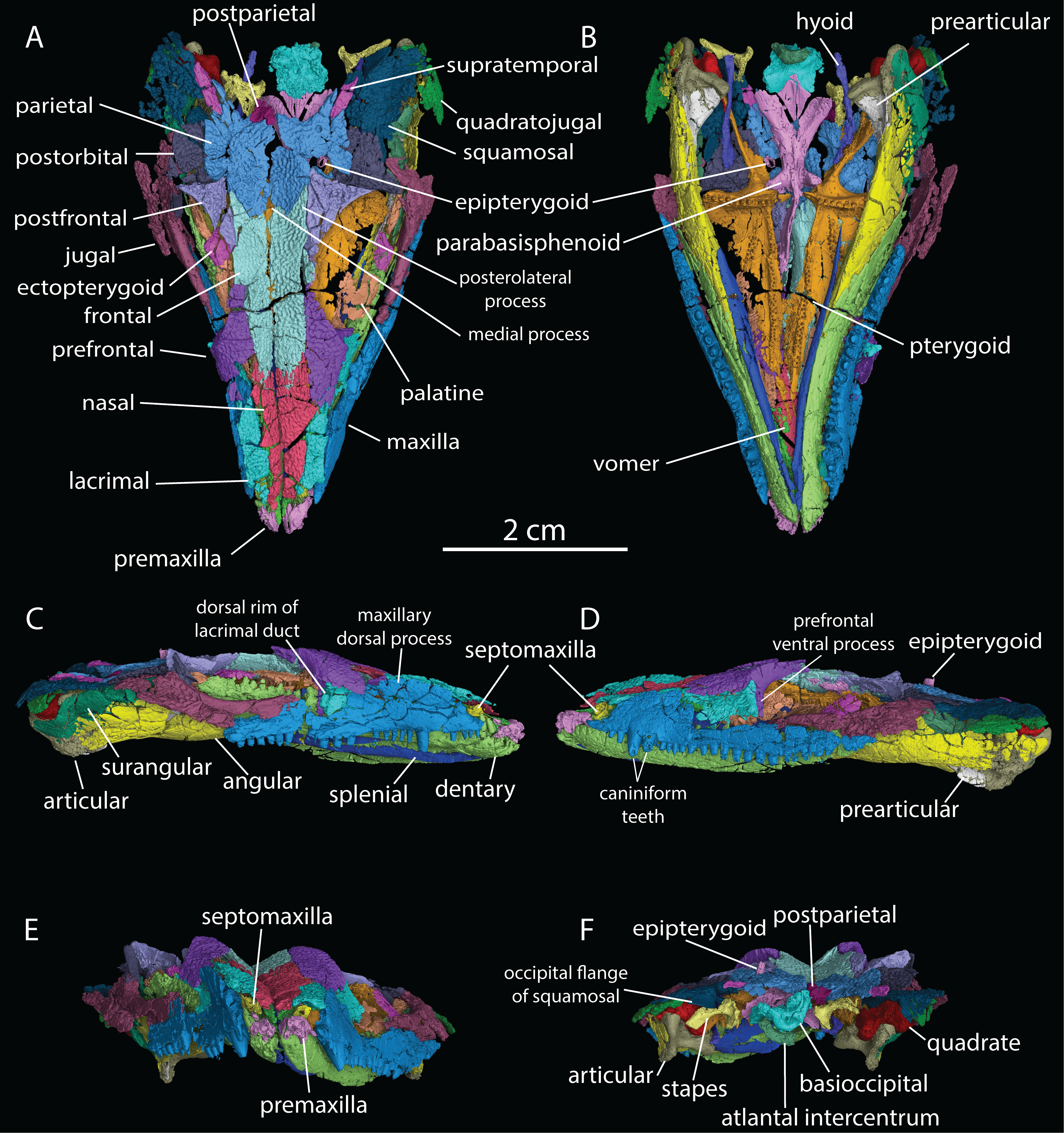
- μCT segmentation of USNM PAL 392180, a skull referred to P. archeri

Scientific classification
- Kingdom: Animalia
- Phylum: Chordata
- Family: †Protorothyrididae
- Genus: †Protorothyris; Price, 1937

Species
- †P. archeri Price, 1937; †P. morani (Romer, 1952)

Synonyms
- Melanothyris Romer, 1952

= Protorothyris =

Protorothyris Temporal range: Asselian, 299–294.6 Ma

Extinct genus of reptiles

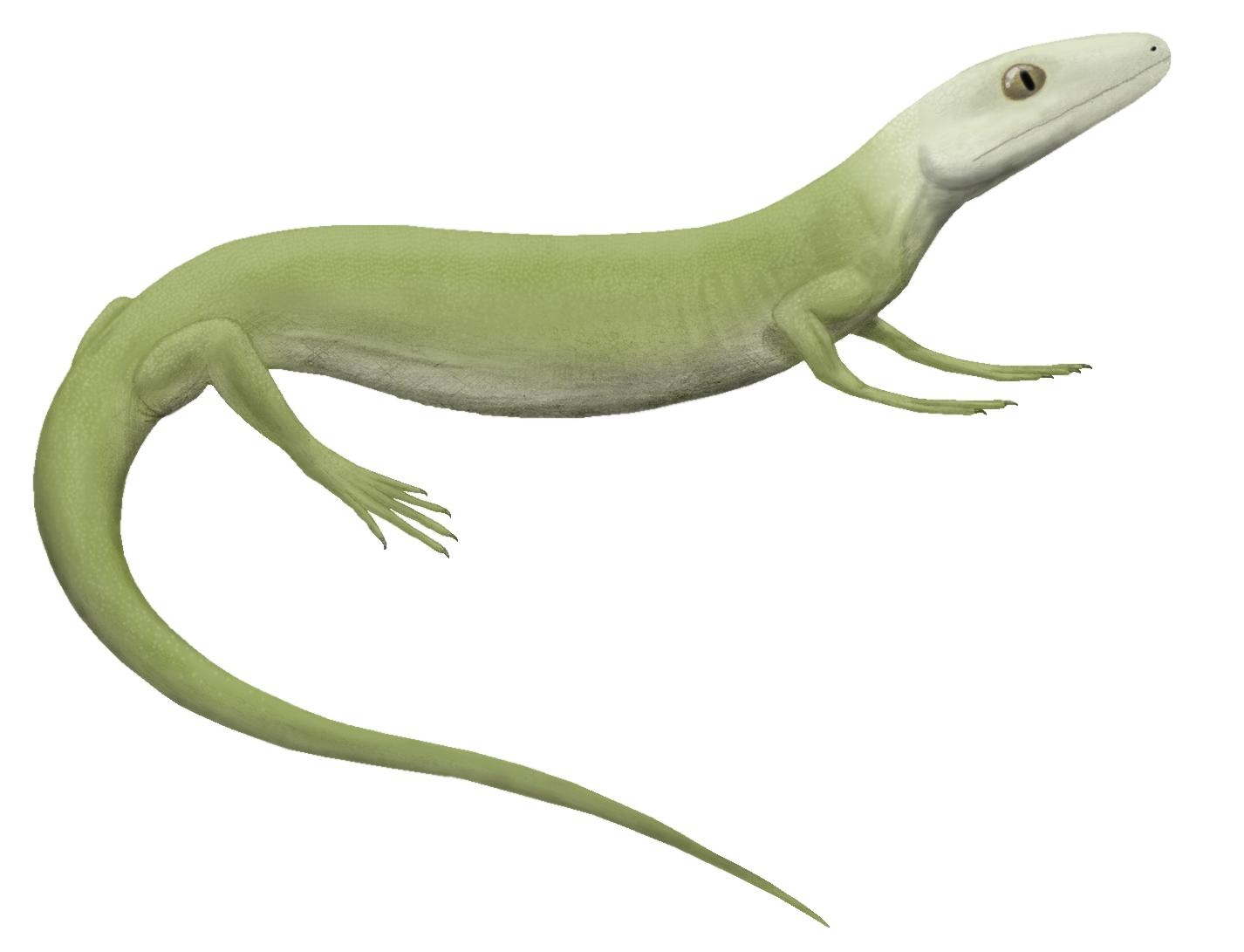
Life restoration

Protorothyris is an extinct genus of Early Permian protorothyridid known from Texas and West Virginia of the United States. It was first named by Llewellyn Ivor Price in 1937 and the type species is Protorothyris archeri. P. archeri is known from the holotype MCZ 1532, a three-dimensionally preserved skull and from the referred specimens, which come from four additional individuals, MCZ 2147-2150. All specimens were collected in the Cottonwood Creek site, from the Archer City Formation, Texas, dating to the Asselian stage of the Cisuralian epoch, about 299–294.6 million years ago. In 2025, a specimen referred to P. archeri was three-dimensionally reconstructed and described using μCT data.

A second species, P. morani, was first named by Alfred Sherwood Romer in 1952 with its own generic name, Melanothyris. In 1973, J. Clark and Robert L. Carroll recombined P. morani as a Protorothyris species. It is known from the holotype CM 8617, a three-dimensionally preserved skull. It was collected in the Blacksville site, from the Washington Formation (Asselian stage) of West Virginia. Protorothyris was the size of the average lizard, about 30 cm in length.

While traditionally considered a "eureptile", this phylogenetic position has been challenged by studies in the 2020s, who find it either to be a basal reptile, or not a reptile at all, but a reptiliomorph.
