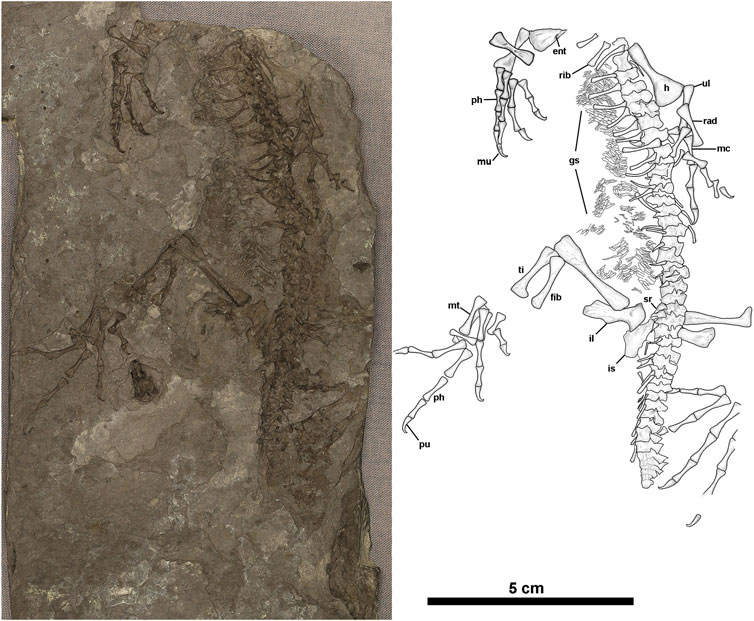

Scientific classification
- Domain: Eukaryota
- Kingdom: Animalia
- Phylum: Chordata
- Class: Reptilia
- Family: †Protorothyrididae
- Genus: †Anthracodromeus; Carroll & Baird, 1972
- Species: †A. longipes

Binomial name
- †Anthracodromeus longipes (Cope, 1875 [originally Sauropleura])

= Anthracodromeus =

Anthracodromeus Temporal range: Late Carboniferous, 307.1–305 Ma

Extinct genus of tetrapods

Anthracodromeus is an extinct genus of Late Carboniferous (late Westphalian stage) "protorothyridid" tetrapods known from Ohio. It is known from the holotype AMNH 6940, a nearly complete skeleton. It was collected in the Linton site in Jefferson County, from the Allegheny Group. A. longipes was first assigned by Edward Drinker Cope in 1875 to a species of Sauropleura. The genus was first named by Robert L. Carroll and Donald Baird in 1972 and the type species is Anthracodromeus longipes. It is amongst the oldest known tetrapods to display adaptations for climbing.

== Features and environment ==
Anthracodromeus was between 15 and 20 cm long when alive, with about 5 cm of this being tail. It had a long body, with 27 vertebrae between the five cervical vertebrae and the sacrum. Each vertebra had a short pair of ribs attached to it. The limbs were quite short, but each foot was at least 2 cm long - as long as the rest of the limb put together. There are 20 caudal vertebrae in the tail, but unlike the thoracic/lumbar vertebrae, these do not have neural spines. The scapulae and much of the skull are missing, as is the lower jaw. The parietals, temporals and occipitals are present, as is the edge of the eye socket, but nothing further forward than this. A new specimen with preserved limbs shows that the phalanges were elongated and unguals that are strongly curved at the tips, which indicates that it was at least partially adapted for climbing, though not to the degree that it was obligately arboreal.
