= Hassiacoscutum =

Scientific classification
- Kingdom: Animalia
- Phylum: Chordata
- Order: †Chroniosuchia
- Family: †Bystrowianidae
- Genus: †Hassiacoscutum; Witzmann et al., 2019
- Species: †H. munki

Binomial name
- †Hassiacoscutum munki Witzmann et al., 2019

Extinct genus of chordates

Hassiacoscutum is an extinct genus of bystrowianid chroniosuchian found in the Korbach Fissure of the Werra Formation in Hesse, Germany.

Hassiacoscutum is known by one species, Hassiacoscutum munki, from a single holotype specimen, SMNK-PAL-9104. The specimen consists of a preserved dorsal osteoderm, and incomplete, crushed ventral processes.

The discovery of Hassiacoscutum in central Germany represents the first Permian chroniosuchian found outside of Russia and China, as well as providing a link to other Permian tetrapods found in Laurasia. The name of the genus is derived from Latin 'Hassiacus', the medieval term for Hesse, and from Latin 'scutum' meaning shield. The species epithet munki honors Wolfgang Munk, for his contributions to the State Museum of Natural History Karlsruhe and original involvement in the excavation of the Korbach Fissure in the 1990s.
