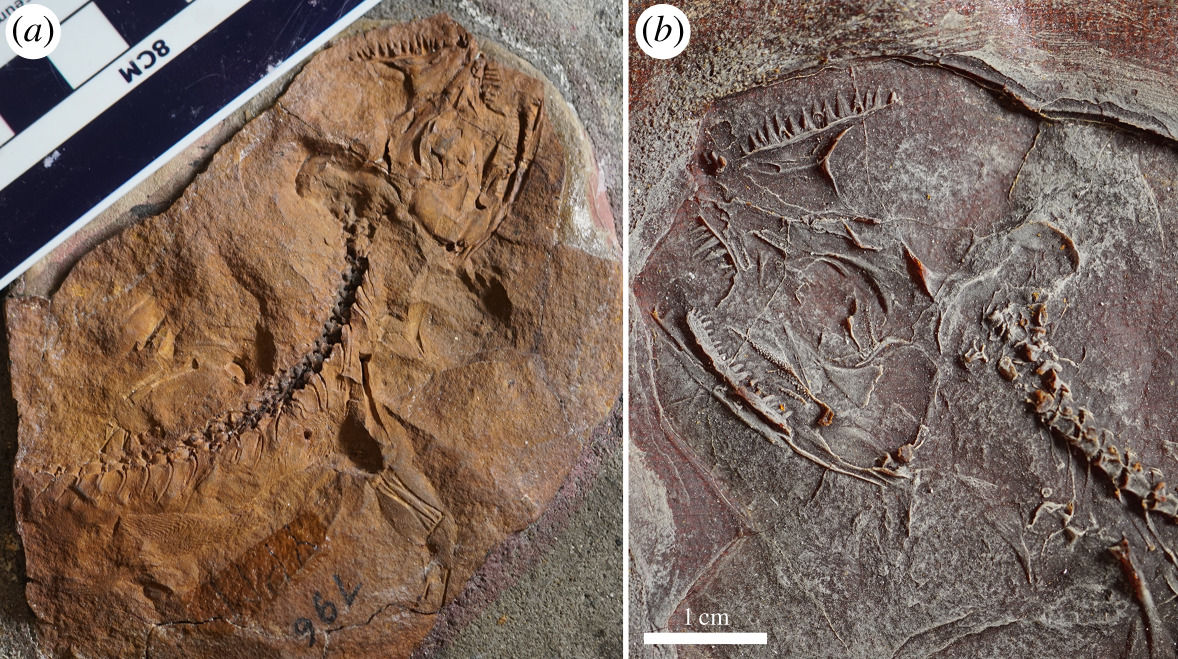
- Original fossil (a) and resin cast (b) of YPM 796

Scientific classification
- Kingdom: Animalia
- Phylum: Chordata
- Family: †Protorothyrididae
- Genus: †Cephalerpeton; Moodie, 1912
- Species: †C. ventriarmatum

Binomial name
- †Cephalerpeton ventriarmatum Moodie, 1912

= Cephalerpeton =

Cephalerpeton Temporal range: Late Carboniferous, 307.1–305 Ma

Extinct genus of tetrapods

Cephalerpeton is an extinct genus of "protorothyridid" tetrapods known from the Late Carboniferous (late Westphalian stage) of Illinois.

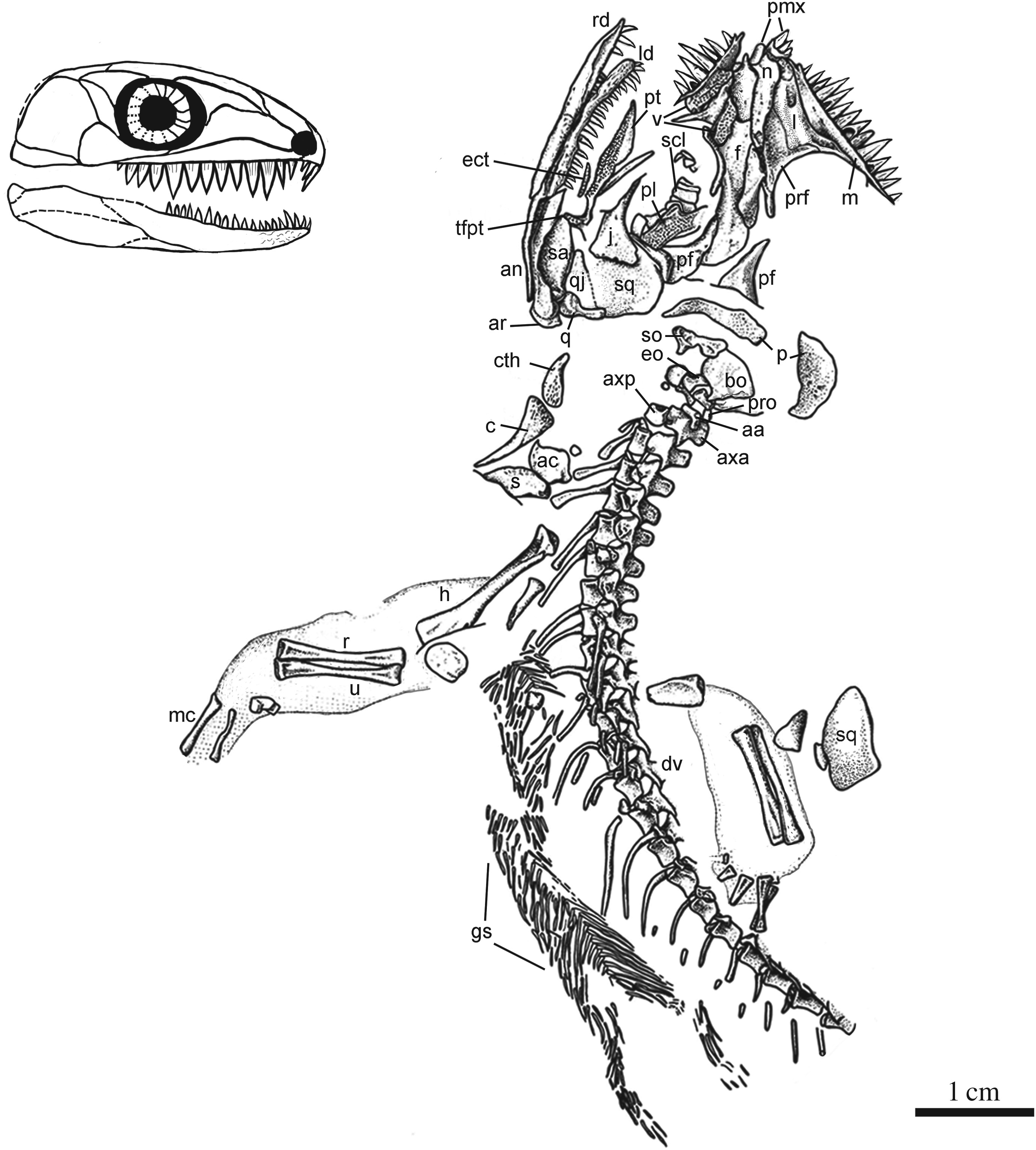
Skull restoration and diagram of YPM 796

It is known from the holotype YPM 796, a partial skeleton. It was collected in the Mazon Creek site, from the Francis Creek Shale Member of the Carbondale Formation. It was first named by R. L. Moodie in 1912 as an amphibamid amphibian and the type species is Cephalerpeton ventriarmatum. It was first assigned to Protorothyrididae by Robert L. Carroll and Donald Baird in 1972 and this placement has been widely accepted.
