= Vladimír Bystrov =

- Born: 7 August 1935; Prague, Czechoslovakia
- Died: 1 June 2010 (aged 74); Prague, Czech Republic
- Occupations: Writer, journalist, translator, film critic
- Writing career
- Period: 1960s–2010
- Genres: commentary, film criticism, journalism, technical translation

Vladimír Bystrov (7 August 1935 – 1 June 2010) was a Czech journalist, film critic, commentator and translator.

== Early life ==
Bystrov was the son of Nikolay Vladimirovich Bystrov, who fled Russia in 1920, settled in Prague, but then was taken back to Russia to a concentration camp at the end of World War II. This had a great effect upon the young Bystrov's life, as he eventually became the chairman of the “Oni byli prvni”, or, “They Were the First” Committee, an organization founded by the few survivors and the descendants of Czechoslovak citizens abducted to the Soviet Union who helped document the fates of Russian and Ukrainian immigrants who were taken by force to the said camps. The name “Oni byli prvni” refers to the fact that those victims of Soviet abduction were the first victims of communism on Czechoslovak soil.

The pseudo-democratic Czechoslovak state failed because it only looked on as the abductions took place and did little against them. The state did not even protest. It was a disease of the time, one of many troubles which no one paid much attention to. Czechoslovakia declared itself as a democratic state but it fell short of that definition. Historically it is not right to say that the communists came in 1948. No, they came much earlier and acted much earlier.

— Vladimir Bystrov (as quoted on Radio Praha)

== Career ==
After graduating from the Film and TV School of the Academy of Performing Arts in Prague, Bystrov was mostly a film critic until 1971, when he was banned from publishing by the occupying Russian communists for twenty years. After the collapse of the communist regime in November 1989, he returned to journalism, writing mainly political commentaries and historical essays. Until 1992 he headed the foreign desk of Reflex and he was the editor-in-chief of the PRO weekly and daily Lidové noviny and later at the Czechoslovak Ministry of Foreign Affairs. From 1994 he was a co-owner of the Bystrov and sons publishing house and from 2003 an independent publisher. He also translated Russian literature, mainly non-fiction.

== Later career and death ==
In 2007 President Václav Klaus decorated him with the state Order of Tomas Garrigue Masaryk. In 2008, he was made a Rudolf Medek Award (in Czech: Cena Rudolfa Medka) laureate.

Since 1995, the Office for Documentation and Investigation of Communist Crimes has published studies documenting the communist era. The Abductions of Czechoslovak Citizens to the Soviet Union between 1945 and 1955, written by Bystrov, is available free of charge from that office.

Bystrov died in Prague after a long illness at the age of 74.

== Partial list of published works ==
- Z Prahy do gulagu aneb překáželi (Edice Žaluji) – 1999
