= Cape Bystrova =

Headland on Jackson Island, Russia

Coordinates: 81.333°N 55.500°E

Cape Bystrov (Russian: Мыс Быстрова) is a headland located on the north-west part of Jackson Island, Russia. The cape is named in honour of Alexey Bystrov, who was a Russian paleontologist.
