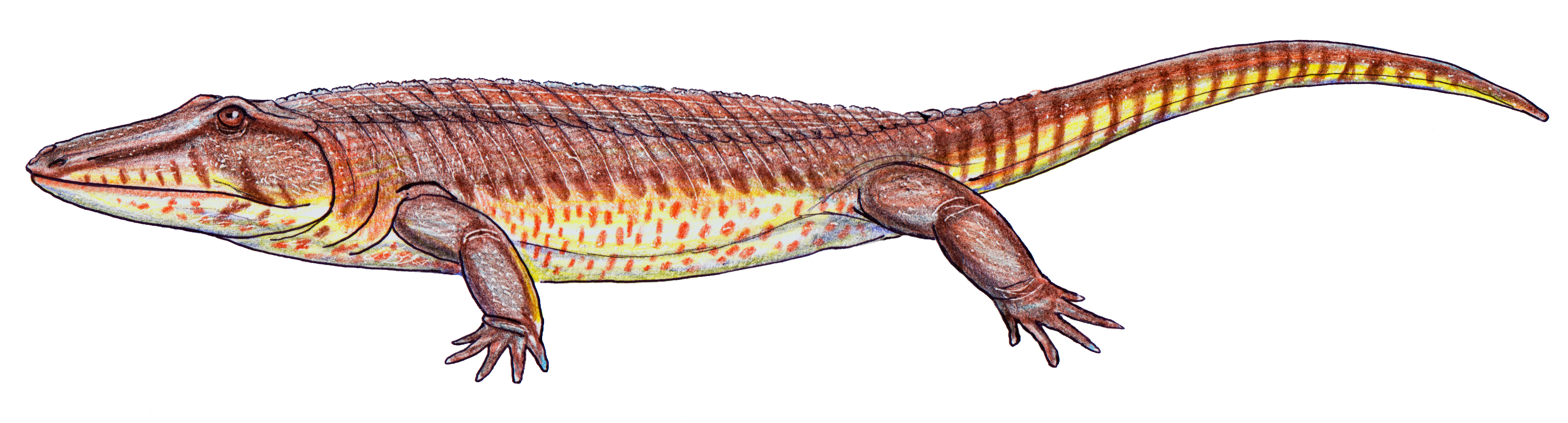
- J. mirabilis

Scientific classification
- Kingdom: Animalia
- Phylum: Chordata
- Clade: Reptiliomorpha (?)
- Order: †Chroniosuchia
- Family: †Chroniosuchidae
- Genus: †Jarilinus; Golubev, 1998

Species
- †J. mirabilis (Vjuschkov, 1957 [originally Chroniosuchus mirabilis]) (type)

= Jarilinus =

Jarilinus Temporal range: Upper Permian, 255 Ma

Extinct genus of tetrapodomorphs

Jarilinus is an extinct genus of chroniosuchid reptiliomorph from upper Permian (upper Tatarian age) deposits of Novgorod and Orenburg Region, Russia. It was first named by V. K. Golubev in 1998, from skull fragments and trunk scutes. The type species is Jarilinus mirabilis.
