= Alexey Bystrow =

Soviet paleontologist, anatomist, and histologist

Alexey Petrovich Bystrow, sometimes spelled Alexey Petrovich Bystrov and Aleksei Petrovich Bystrow, (Russian: Алексе́й Петро́вич Быстро́в; February 1, 1899 – August 29, 1959) was a Soviet paleontologist, anatomist, and histologist.

== Biography ==
Born in the village of Tarasovo in Ryazan Governorate on 1 February 1899. His father was a Russian Orthodox protopriest and his mother was a school teacher.

== Bystrow's articles in English ==
- Bystrow, A.P. Kotlassia prima Amalitzky. Bulletin of the Geological Society of America, Washington, 1944, v.55, N5, pp.379-416.
- Bystrow, A.P. Hydrophilous and Xerophilous Labyrinthodonts. Acta Zool., Stockholm, A.Bonniers forlag, 1947, v.28, N1, pp. 137–164.
- Bystrow, A.P. The microstructure of dermal bones in Arthrodires. Acta Zool., Stockholm, A. Bonniers forlag, 1957, v.38, N2-3, pp. 239–275.
- Bystrow, A.P. The microstructure of skeleton elements in some vertebrates from lower Devonian deposits of the USSR. Acta Zool., Stockholm, A. Bonniers boktryckeri, 1959, v.40, N1, pp. 59–83.

== Bystrow's articles in German ==
- Bystrow, A.P. Hernia diaphragmatica beim Hunde. Anatomischer Anzeiger, Jena, Verlag von Gustav Fischer in Jena, 1930, Bd.70, Nr.8/10, SS.192-212.
- Bystrow, A. Assimilation des Atlas und Manifestation des Proatlas. Zeitschrift für Anatomie und Entwicklungsgeschichte (Zeitschrift für die gesamte Anatomie), Berlin, Verlag von Julius Springer, 1931, Bd. 95, Heft 1-2, S. 210-242.
- Bystrow, A.P. Morphologische Untersuchungen über die Occipitalregion und die ersten Halswirbel der Säugetiere und des Menschen. I. Mitteilung. Über den Proatlas und Anteproatlas bei der Robbe. Zeitschr. f. Anatomie u. Entwickl. (Zeitschr. f. die gesamte Anatomie), Berlin, Verlag von J. Springer, 1933, Bd.100, Heft 3, S. 362-386.
- Bystrow, A.P. Morphologische Untersuchungen über die Occipitalregion und die ersten Halswirbel der Säugetiere und des Menschen. II. Mitteilung. Die Assimilation des Atlas und deren phylogenetische Bedeutung. Zeitschr. f. Anatomie u. Entwickl. (Zeitschr. f. die gesamte Anatomie), Berlin, Verlag von J. Springer, 1933, Bd. 102, Heft 2-3, S. 307-334.
- Bystrow, A.P. Morphologische Untersuchungen der Deckknochen des Schädels der Wirbeltiere. I. Mitteilung. Schädel der Stegocephalen. Acta Zoologica, Stockholm, Albert Bonniers forlag, 1935, Arg. 16, Haft. 1–2, S. 65-141.
- Bystrow, A.P. Dvinosaurus als neotenische Form der Stegocephalen. Acta Zoologica, Stockholm, A. Bonniers forlag, 1938, Arg. 19, Haft. 1–2, S. 209–295.
- Bystrow, A.P. Zahnstruktur der Labyrinthodonten. Acta Zoologica, Stockholm, A. Bonniers forlag, 1938, Arg. 19, Haft. 3, S. 387–425.
- Bystrow, A.P. Blutgefäßsystem der Labyrinthodonten (Gefasse des Kopfes). Acta Zoologica, Stockholm, A. Bonniers forlag, 1939, Arg. 20, Haft. 1, S. 125–155.
- Bystrow, A.P. Zahnstruktur der Crossopterygier. Acta Zoologica, Stockholm, A. Bonniers forlag, 1939, Arg.20, Haft.2-3, SS.283-338.
- Bystrow, A.P. Deckknochen und Zähne der Osteolepis und Dipterus. Acta Zoologica, Stockholm, A.Bonniers forlag, 1942, Arg. 23, Haft. 1–3, S. 263–289.

== Publications about Bystrow ==
- Olson, E.C. The other side of the medal: a paleobiologist reflects on the art and serendipity of science. Blacksburg, Virginia, The McDonald & Woodward Publishing Company, 1990, 182 p.
- Sokolov, B.S. Professor Aleksei Petrovich Bystrow: Recollections. Paleontological Journal, 2002, V.36, N.2, P.224-229.

== See also ==
- Bystrow cape
- Bystrowiana
