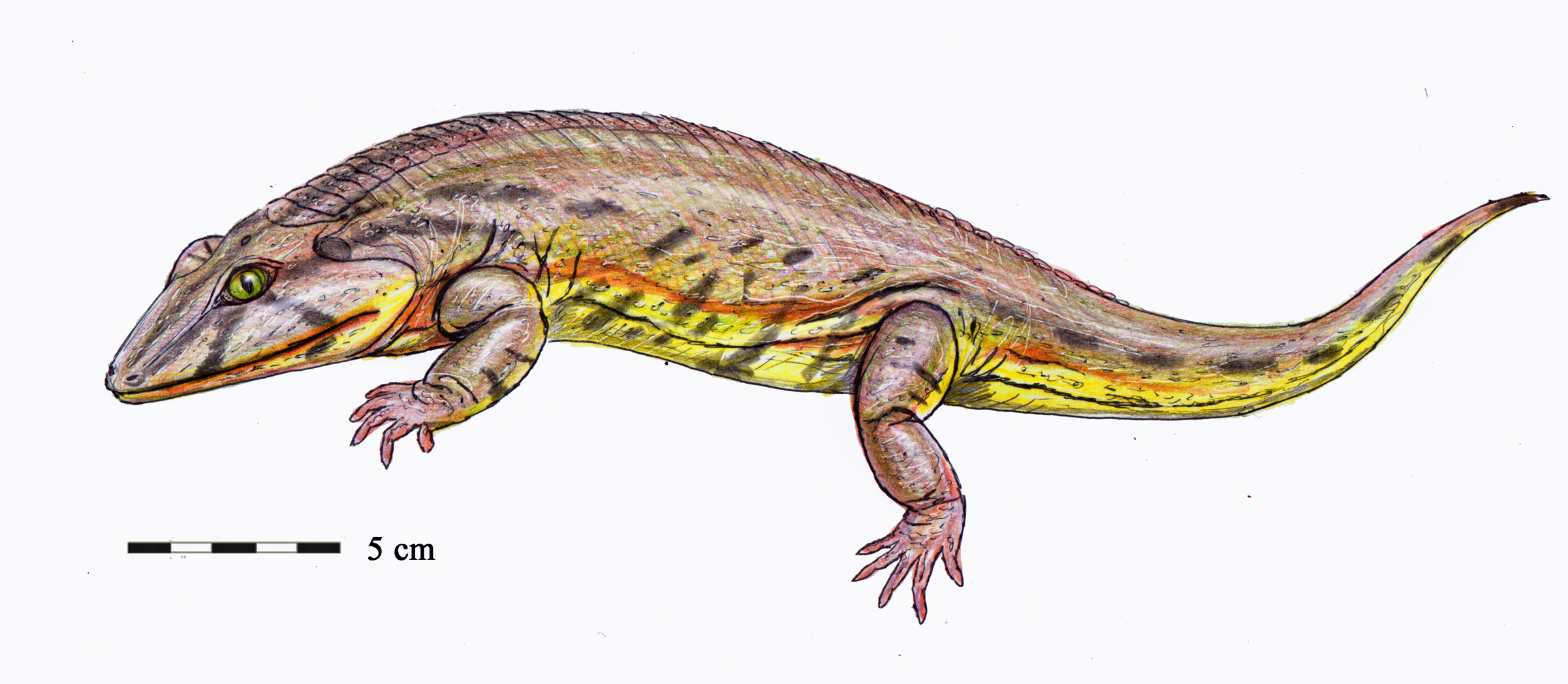
- Bystrowiella schumanni

Scientific classification
- Domain: Eukaryota
- Kingdom: Animalia
- Phylum: Chordata
- Order: †Chroniosuchia
- Family: †Bystrowianidae
- Genus: †Bystrowiella; Witzmann, Schoch & Maisch, 2008

Species
- †B. schumanni Witzmann, Schoch & Maisch, 2008 (type)

= Bystrowiella =

Bystrowiella Temporal range: Middle Triassic, Ladinian

Extinct genus of tetrapodomorphs

Bystrowiella is an extinct genus of bystrowianid chroniosuchians from upper Middle Triassic (Ladinian age) deposits of Kupferzell and Vellberg, northern Baden-Württemberg, Germany.

== Discovery and naming ==
It was first named by Florian Witzmann, Rainer R. Schoch and Michael W. Maisch in 2008, from a complete osteoderm fused with tip of neural spine (SMNS 91034, the holotype), partial osteoderms (SMNS 91036, 91037) and vertebrae (SMNS 81698, 81871–81874, 81876, 81877, 81879). The type species is Bystrowiella schumanni. The genus is named in honour of Dr. Alexey Bystrow, a Russian paleontologist and the species in honour of Schumann family. Bystrowiellas closest relative was Synesuchus.

B. schumanni is the first bystrowianid identified outside Russia and China.

== Description ==
Bystrowiella is known by cranial and postcranial material. The premaxilla has an edentulous crest lateral to the choana; the premaxillary teeth are of different sizes, the jugal has a noticeably long and narrow anterior process; the postparietals and tabulars are enlarged and form facets for connection with the anteriormost osteoderm. Prefrontal and postfrontal parts are not in contact, a typical characteristic of chroniosuchids. However, the antorbital fenestra and the internarial fontanelle are absent, a feature not common to chroniosuchids. The postcranial skeleton is similar to that of amniotes. The interclavicle is thin, with a distinct parasternal process; the humerus is narrow, with a short supinator process; trunk ribs are long and curved, with thin shaft without additional protrusions; the rib heads are widely spaced.

== Phylogeny ==
It was assigned to bystrowianids due to the characteristics of the vertebrae and osteoderms. Below is a cladogram after Novikov (2018) showing internal relationships of bystrowianids based on differences in their osteoderms:

- Bystrowianidae
  - - Dromotectinae
    - Axitectinae
  - Bystrowianinae
    - - Bystrowiella
      - Synesuchus
    - - Vyushkoviana
      - Bystrowiana
