= Synesuchus =

Synesuchus Temporal range: Middle Triassic, Ladinian

Scientific classification
- Domain: Eukaryota
- Kingdom: Animalia
- Phylum: Chordata
- Clade: Reptiliomorpha (?)
- Order: †Chroniosuchia
- Family: †Bystrowianidae
- Genus: †Synesuchus; Novikov & Shishkin, 2000

Species
- †S. muravjevi Novikov & Shishkin, 2000 (type)

Extinct genus of tetrapodomorphs

Synesuchus is an extinct genus of bystrowianid chroniosuchians from middle Triassic (Ladinian stage) deposits of Komi Republic, northern Fore-Ural of Russia. It is known from the holotype PIN 4466/12, which consists of armor scute and from the referred materials PIN 4466/10, 4466/11, 4466/13 and 4466/14. It was found in the Nadkrasnokamenskaya Formation of the Bukobay Horizon. It was first named by I.V. Novikov and M.A. Shishkin in 2000 and the type species is Synesuchus muravjevi. The generic name comes from Syne, from Bolshaya Synya river, and “crocodile” (suchos in Greek), and the specific name honors the Russian geologist Ivan Stepanovich Murav'ev.

== Phylogeny ==
Synesuchus in a cladogram after Novikov (2018) showing internal relationships of bystrowianids based on differences in their osteoderms:

- Bystrowianidae
  - - Dromotectinae
    - Axitectinae
  - Bystrowianinae
    - - Bystrowiella
      - Synesuchus
    - - Vyushkoviana
      - Bystrowiana
