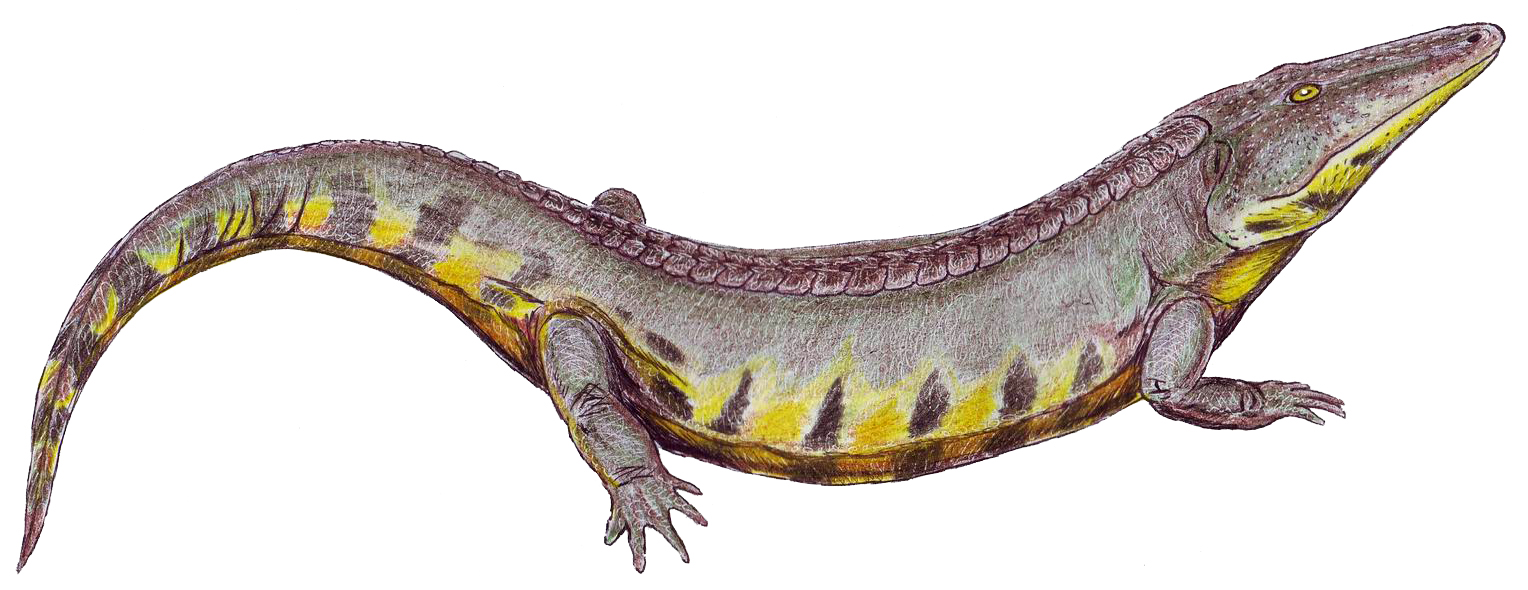
- Bystrowiana permira

Scientific classification
- Kingdom: Animalia
- Phylum: Chordata
- Clade: Reptiliomorpha (?)
- Order: †Chroniosuchia
- Family: †Bystrowianidae
- Genus: †Bystrowiana; Vyushkov, 1957

Species
- †B. permira Vyushkov, 1957 (type); †B. sinica Young, 1979

= Bystrowiana =

Bystrowiana Temporal range: Lopingian to Early Triassic

Extinct genus of tetrapodomorphs

Bystrowiana is an extinct genus of bystrowianid chroniosuchian from upper Permian deposits of Vladimir Region, Russia and Jiyuan, China. Chroniosuchians are often thought to be reptiliomorphs, but some recent phylogenetic analyses suggest instead that they are stem-tetrapods. The genus is named in honour of the Russian paleontologist Alexey Bystrow. It was first described by Vyushkov in 1957 and the type species is Bystrowiana permira. Two species—B. permira and B. sinica—are known.

Bystrowiana is known from a 30 cm skull, which suggests it was a large animal, up to 2.5 m (8.2 ft) in total body length.

== Phylogeny ==
Bystrowiana in a cladogram after Novikov (2018) showing internal relationships of bystrowianids based on differences in their osteoderms:

- Bystrowianidae
  - - Dromotectinae
    - Axitectinae
  - Bystrowianinae
    - - Bystrowiella
      - Synesuchus
    - - Vyushkoviana
      - Bystrowiana
