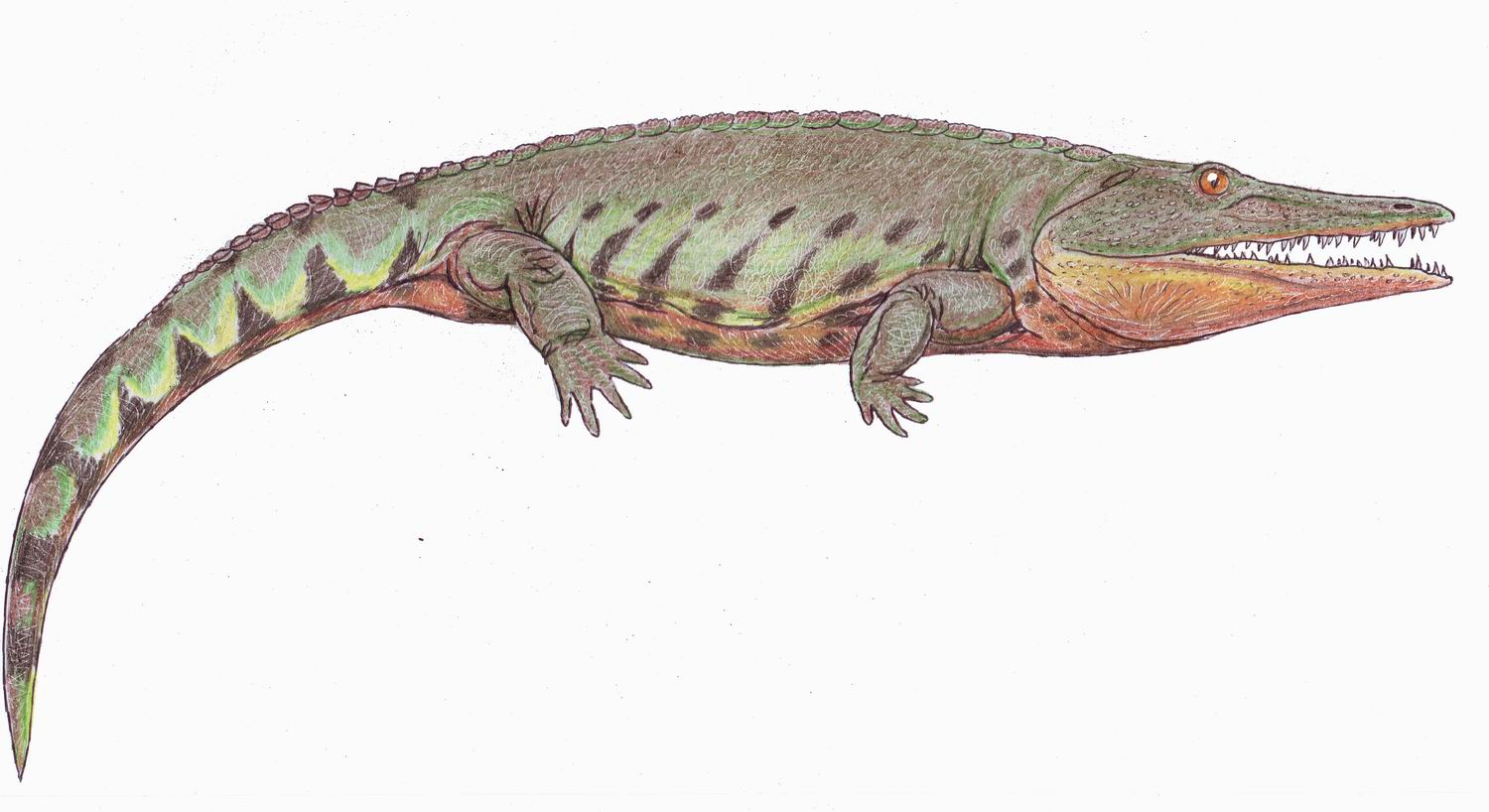
- Uralerpeton tverdokhlebovae

Scientific classification
- Kingdom: Animalia
- Phylum: Chordata
- Clade: Reptiliomorpha (?)
- Order: †Chroniosuchia
- Family: †Chroniosuchidae
- Genus: †Uralerpeton; Golubev, 1998

Species
- †U. tverdokhlebovae Golubev, 1998 (type)

= Uralerpeton =

Uralerpeton Temporal range: Upper Permian, 255 Ma

Extinct genus of tetrapodomorphs

Uralerpeton is an extinct genus of chroniosuchid reptiliomorph from upper Permian (upper Tatarian age) deposits of Vladimir Region, European Russia. It was first named by V. K. Golubev in 1998, from skull fragments and trunk scutes. The type species is Uralerpeton tverdokhlebovae, it was a large predator with a 50 – 55 cm skull and a total length that probably exceeded 3 m (9.3 ft).
