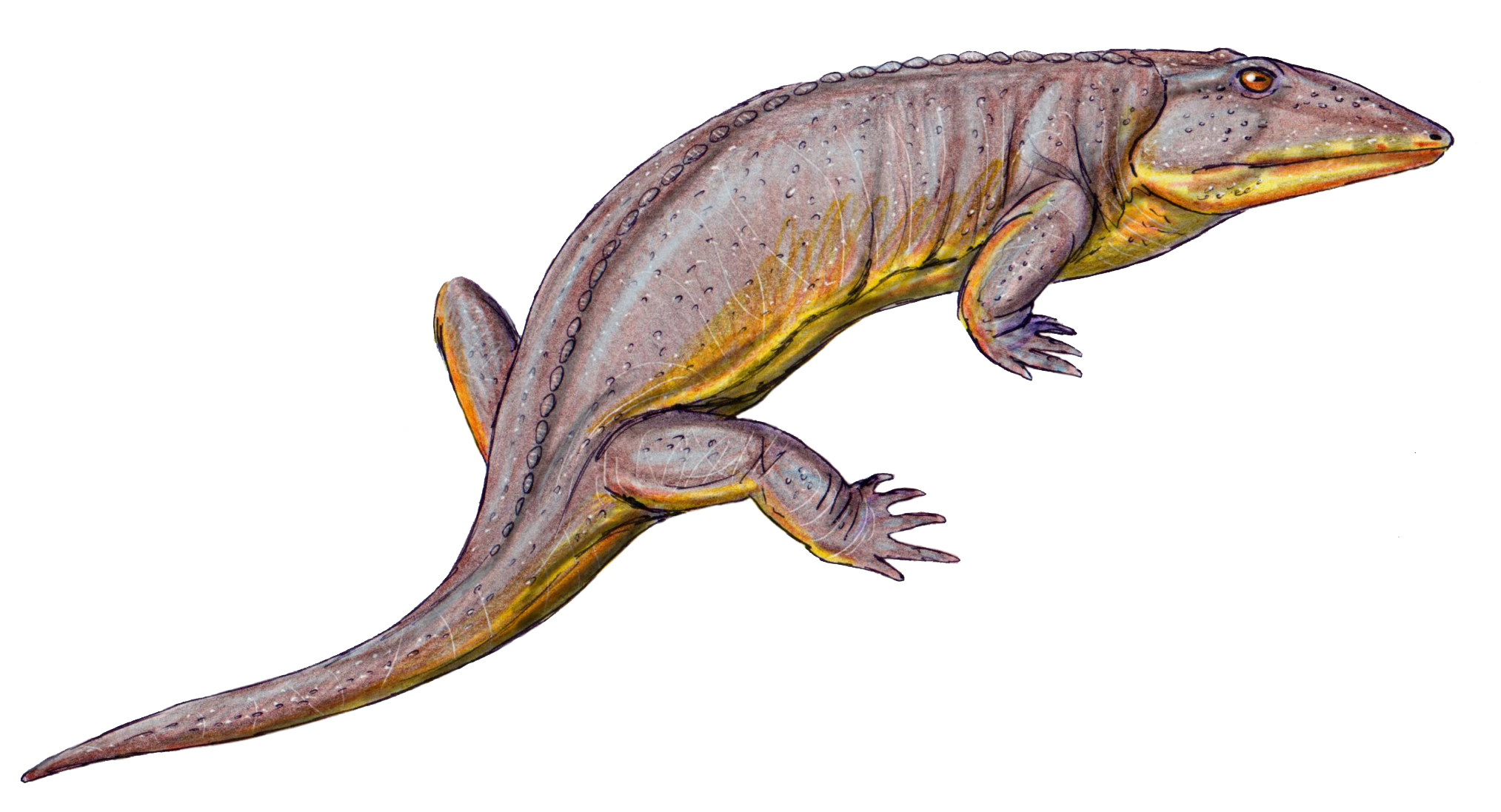
- Restoration

Scientific classification
- Domain: Eukaryota
- Kingdom: Animalia
- Phylum: Chordata
- Clade: Reptiliomorpha (?)
- Order: †Chroniosuchia
- Family: †Bystrowianidae
- Genus: †Axitectum; Shishkin & Novikov, 1992

Species
- †A. vjushkovi Shishkin & Novikov, 1992 (type); †A. georgi Novikov & Shishkin, 2000

Synonyms
- Axitectus Novikov, 2018 (sic)

= Axitectum =

Axitectum Temporal range: Early Triassic

Extinct genus of tetrapodomorphs

Axitectum is an extinct genus of bystrowianid chroniosuchians from lower Triassic deposits of Nizhni Novgorod and Kirov Regions, Russia. It was a rather large animal judging by the size of its vertebrae. The back was covered in bands of highly ornamented osteoderm plates, similar to those found in modern crocodiles. The bands overlapped with the next band at the posterior end.

It was first named by M.A. Shishkin and I.V. Novikov in 1992 and the type species is Axitectum vjushkovi. A. vjushkovi is known from the holotype PIN 1025/334, which consists of armor scute. It was found in the Vokhminskaya Formation of the Vokhmin Horizon and named in honour of Vyushkov, who was a Russian paleontologist. A second species, A. georgi, was named by I.V. Novikov and M.A. Shishkin in 2000 on the basis of another armor scute (holotype PIN 953/392). It was found in the Fedorovskaya Formation of the Yarenskian Superhorizon and named in honour of the geologist Georgii Ivanovich Blom. A third species, A. blomi (which also named in honour of G.I. Blom, in 1992), is now considered junior synonym of the type species. Other materials also referred to Axitectum.
