= Vyushkoviana =

Vyushkoviana Temporal range: Early Triassic

Scientific classification
- Kingdom: Animalia
- Phylum: Chordata
- Order: †Chroniosuchia
- Family: †Bystrowianidae
- Genus: †Vyushkoviana
- Species: †V. operta

Binomial name
- †Vyushkoviana operta Shishkin et al., 2014

Extinct genus of tetrapods

Vyushkoviana is an extinct genus of bystrowianid that lived during the Early Triassic epoch.

== Distribution ==
Vyushkoviana operta is known from Russia.
