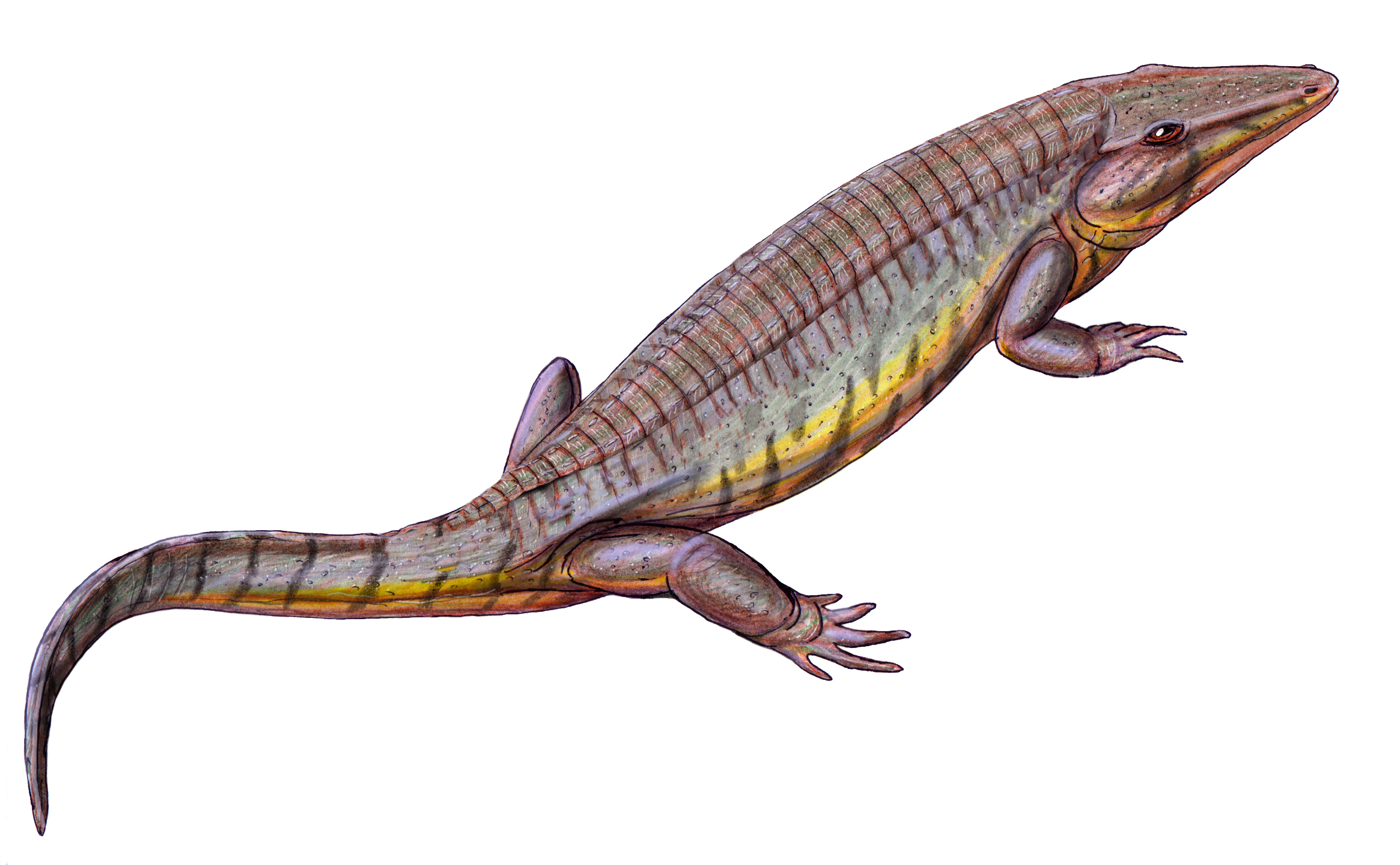
- Suchonica vladimiri

Scientific classification
- Kingdom: Animalia
- Phylum: Chordata
- Clade: Reptiliomorpha (?)
- Order: †Chroniosuchia
- Family: †Chroniosuchidae
- Genus: †Suchonica; Golubev, 1999

Species
- †S. vladimiri Golubev, 1999 (type)

= Suchonica =

Suchonica Temporal range: Capitanian, 263 Ma

Extinct genus of tetrapodomorphs

Suchonica is an extinct genus of chroniosuchid reptiliomorph from upper Permian (upper Tatarian age) deposits of Sukhona Formation of Vologda Region, Russia. It was first named by V. K. Golubev in 1999, from the anterior armor scute (PIN, no. 4611/1). The type species is Suchonica vladimiri.
