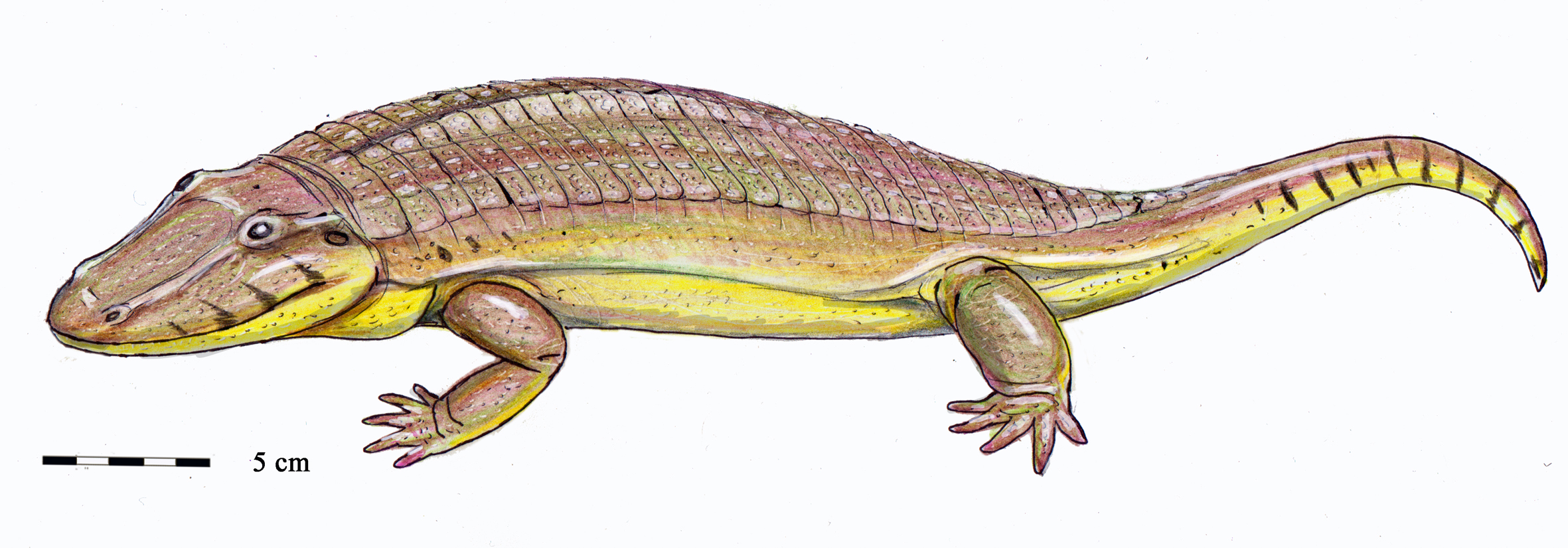
- Madygenerpeton pustulatus

Scientific classification
- Domain: Eukaryota
- Kingdom: Animalia
- Phylum: Chordata
- Clade: Reptiliomorpha (?)
- Order: †Chroniosuchia
- Family: †Chroniosuchidae
- Genus: †Madygenerpeton; Schoch, Voigt & Buchwitz, 2010

Species
- †M. pustulatus Schoch, Voigt & Buchwitz, 2010 (type)

= Madygenerpeton =

Madygenerpeton Temporal range: Carnian

Extinct genus of tetrapodomorphs

Madygenerpeton is an extinct genus of chroniosuchid reptiliomorph from the Late Triassic Madygen Formation of Kyrgyzstan. It was first named by paleontologists Rainer R. Schoch, Sebastian Voigt and Michael Buchwitz in 2010 from a nearly complete skull and associated osteoderms. The type species is M. pustulatus.

== Description ==
Madygenerpeton, like other chroniosuchids, has osteoderms, or bony plates, overlying its spine. These osteoderms interlock with each other and connect to their associated vertebrae on the spinal column. They are wide and have curved or peaked surfaces. On the upper surface of the front end and the lower surface of the back end of each osteoderm there are facets covered in concentric ridges and furrows. These facets allow the plates to interlock with each other. The relatively narrow width of the osteoderms in Madygenerpeton allow for more lateral flexion in the trunk of than other chroniosuchids, up to 7.5°.

The skull has a parabolic outline and its surface is covered with pustular ornamentation. This distinctive ornamentation gives the type species its name, M. pustulatus. Unlike other chroniosuchids, Madygenerpeton lacks an antorbital fontanelle in front of the eyes. The postparietal or posterior area of the skull is concave.

== Paleobiology ==
The tightly interlocking osteoderms along the back of Permian chroniosuchians were likely an adaptation to terrestrial locomotion. The plates made the vertebral column more rigid, allowing it to better cope with stresses from shearing, torsion, compression, and tension. However, the increased stability of the vertebral column resulted in less flexibility. In Madygenerpeton, the increased flexibility of the trunk may have been an adaptation to a secondarily aquatic lifestyle. Greater lateral flexion would have enabled lateral undulation useful for swimming.
