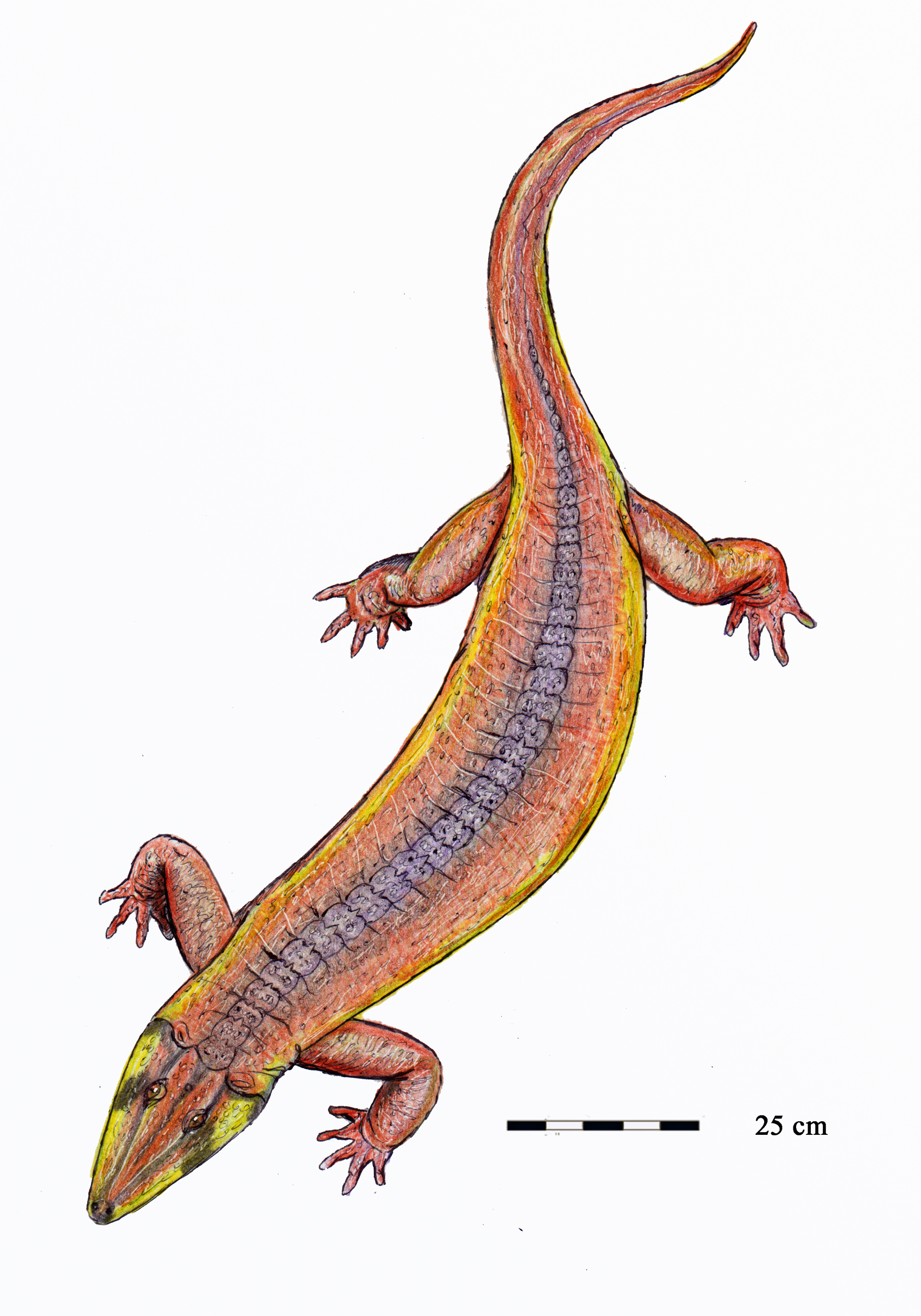
- Dromotectum spinosum

Scientific classification
- Kingdom: Animalia
- Phylum: Chordata
- Clade: Reptiliomorpha (?)
- Order: †Chroniosuchia
- Family: †Bystrowianidae
- Genus: †Dromotectum; Novikov & Shishkin, 2000

Species
- †D. spinosum Novikov & Shishkin, 2000 (type); †D. largum Liu et al., 2014

Synonyms
- Dromotectus Novikov, 2018 (sic)

= Dromotectum =

Dromotectum Temporal range: Late Permian–Early Triassic

Extinct genus of tetrapodomorphs

Dromotectum is an extinct genus of bystrowianid chroniosuchians from the Late Permian of China and Early Triassic of Russia. Two species have been named: the type species D. spinosum and the species D. largum. D. spinosum, the first species to be named, comes from Lower Triassic deposits in the Samara Region of European Russia and is known from the holotype PIN 2424/23, which consists of armor scutes, and from PIN 2424/65, 4495/14 and 2252/397. It was found in the Staritskaya Formation of the Rybinskin Horizon and named by I.V. Novikov and M.A. Shishkin in 2000. The generic name means “corridor with hipped vault” (dromos in Greek) + “roof” (tecton), and the specific name means “spinous” (spinosum in Latin). A second species, D. largum, was named by Liu Jun, Xu Li, Jia Song-Hai, Pu Han-Yong, and Liu Xiao-Ling in 2014 from the Shangshihezi Formation near Jiyuan in Henan province, China on the basis of specimen IVPP V 4013.1, a large scute.
