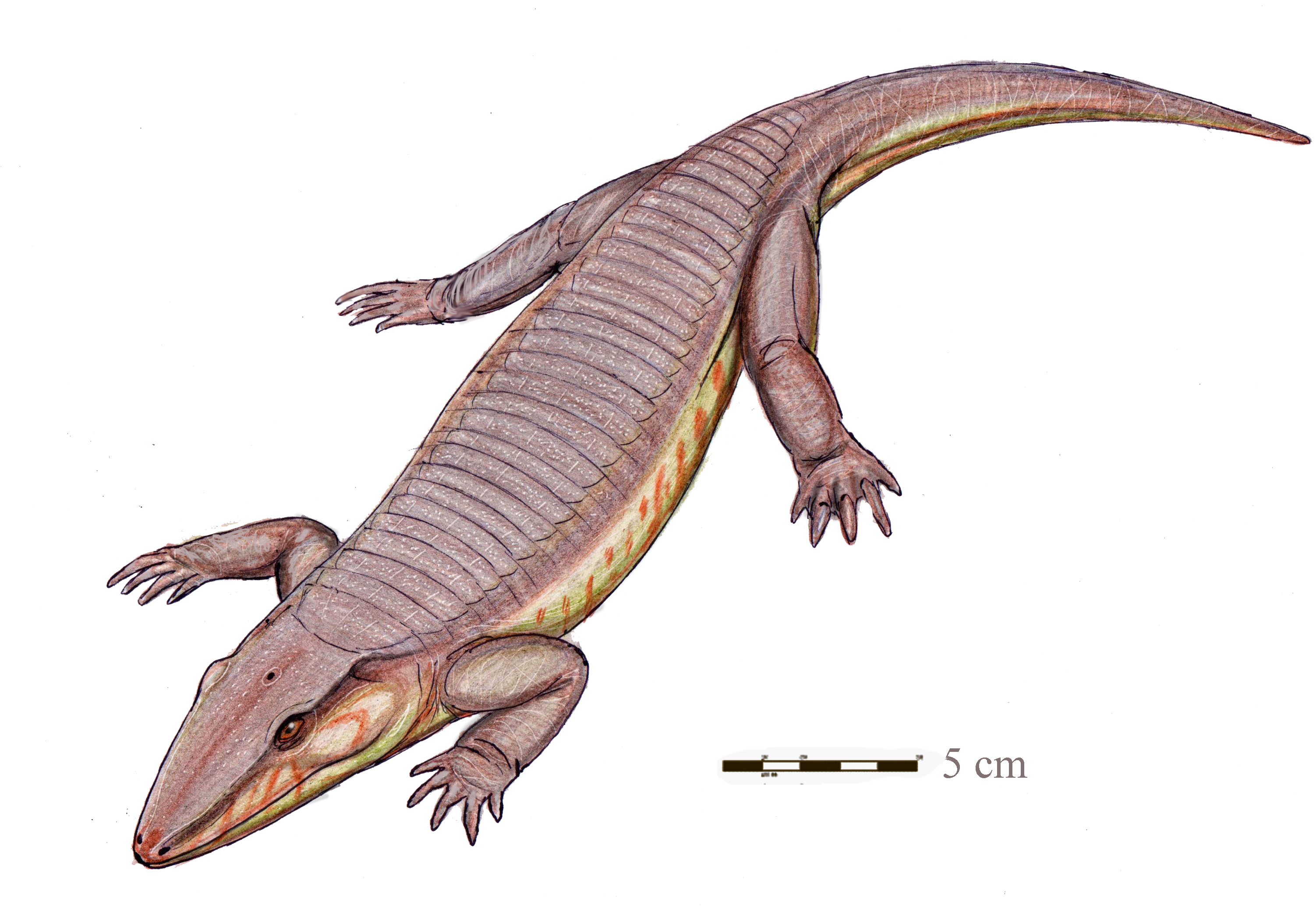
- C. dongusensis

Scientific classification
- Kingdom: Animalia
- Phylum: Chordata
- Clade: Reptiliomorpha (?)
- Order: †Chroniosuchia
- Family: †Chroniosuchidae
- Genus: †Chroniosaurus; Tverdochlebova, 1972

Species
- †C. dongusensis Tverdokhlebova, 1972 (type); †C. levis Golubev, 1998

= Chroniosaurus =

Chroniosaurus Temporal range: 255 Ma Upper Permian

Extinct genus of tetrapodomorphs

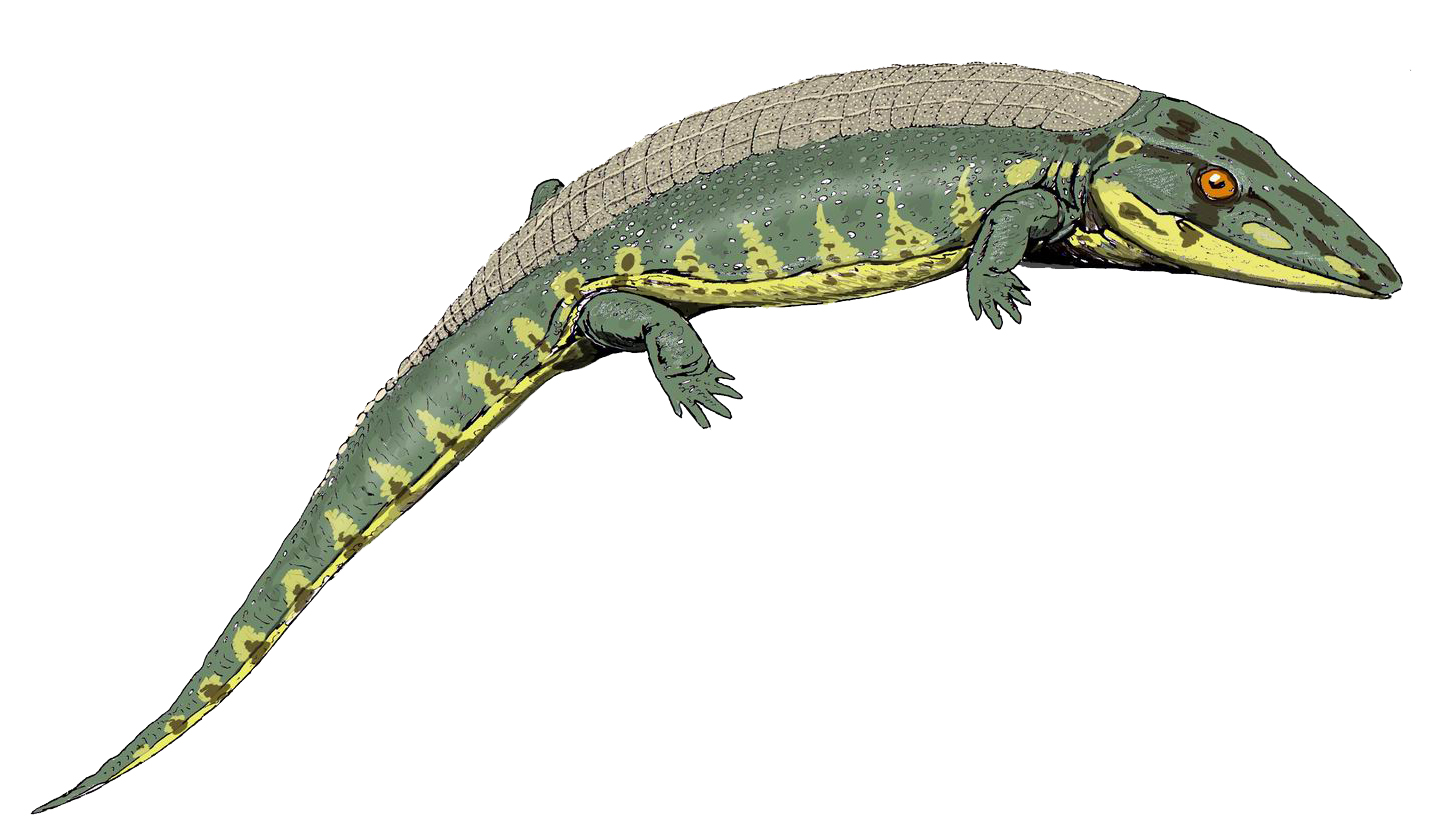
Restoration of C. dongusensis

Chroniosaurus is an extinct genus of chroniosuchid stegocephalian, often considered a reptiliomorph but possibly a stem-tetrapod, from upper Permian (upper Tatarian age) deposits of Novgorod, Orenburg and Vologda Regions, Russia. It was first named by Tverdokhlebova in 1972 and the type species is Chroniosaurus dongusensis.

== Habitation ==
Its lifestyle is uncertain. An early study suggested a fairly aquatic lifestyle, but its femoral microanatomy and dorsal dermal plates suggest a rather terrestrial lifestyle.
