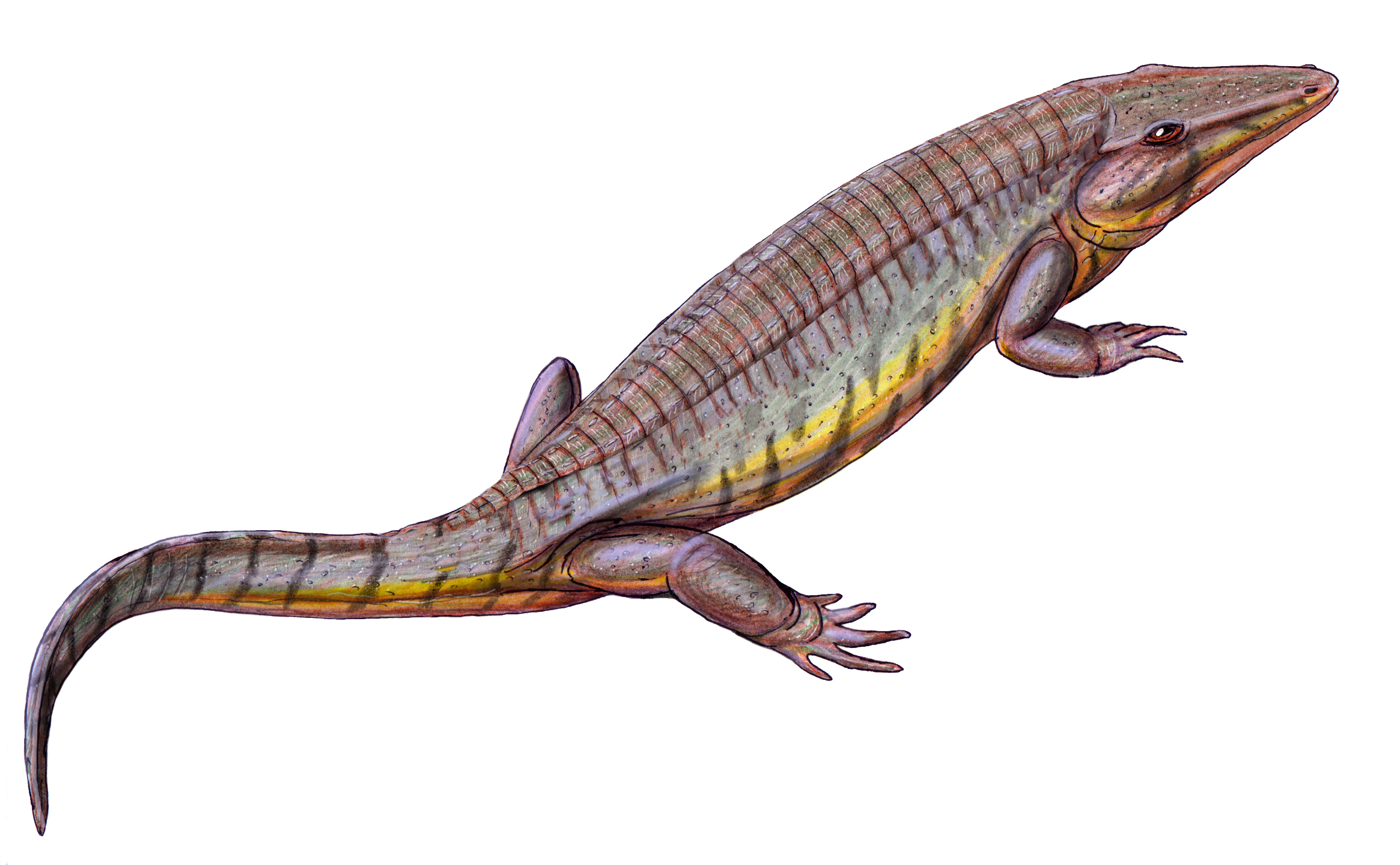
- Suchonica

Scientific classification
- Kingdom: Animalia
- Phylum: Chordata
- Clade: Reptiliomorpha (?)
- Order: †Chroniosuchia; Kuhn, 1970

Subgroups
- See text.

Synonyms
- Chroniosuchida Tatarinov, 1972

= Chroniosuchia =

Chroniosuchia Temporal range: Middle Permian–Upper Triassic

Extinct order of tetrapods

Chroniosuchia is a group of tetrapods that lived from the Middle Permian to Late Triassic in northern Pangaea in what is now Eurasia, including Laos, Kyrgyzstan, China, Germany and Russia. Chroniosuchians are often thought to be reptiliomorphs, but some recent phylogenetic analyses suggest instead that they are stem-tetrapods. They were all rather short limbed with a strong tail and elongated snout, somewhat resembling modern crocodiles. The group is traditionally considered to be a suborder or order of labyrinthodonts. Chroniosuchians likely had ecological niches as riverside predators, and may have been outcompeted by semiaquatic true reptiles such as phytosaurs in the late Triassic. Most forms bore a heavy armour of scutes along the back, possibly for protection against land born predators like therapsids, or to strengthen the axial skeleton for terrestrial locomotion. Indeed, femoral microanatomy of Chroniosaurus suggests that it was amphibious to terrestrial.

== Description ==
The most distinguishing features of chroniosuchians are the rows of interlocking bony plates called osteoderms that run along their backs from head to tail. They are the most commonly found remains of chroniosuchians. Each osteoderm is paired with a single vertebra. The osteoderms are flat plates connected to the neural arches of vertebra by an extension of bone on their undersurfaces. The front margin of each osteoderm has a pair of "anterior wings" that slip into a notch in the posterior margin of the osteoderm in front of it.

Diagram showing different types of tetrapod vertebrae, including the vertebra of the chroniosuchian Bystrowiella schumanni.

Chroniosuchians are distinguished from other early reptiliomorphs by the lack of intertemporal bones in the skull, as well as the presence of holes in front of the eye sockets called antorbital fenestrae. Like many early tetrapods, chroniosuchians have vertebrae that are divided into three parts: a pleurocentrum and an intercentrum on the bottom, and a neural arch on top. Chroniosuchians have shizomerous vertebrae, meaning that the pleurocentrum makes up most of the body of the vertebra while the intercentrum is small and wedge-like.

== Classification ==
=== Taxonomy ===
- Reptiliomorpha
- Order Chroniosuchia
  - Family Bystrowianidae
    - Axitectum
    - Bystrowiana
    - Bystrowiella
    - Dromotectum
    - Hassiacoscutum
    - Jiyuanitectum
    - Synesuchus
  - Family Chroniosuchidae
    - Chroniosaurus
    - Chroniosuchus
    - Ingentidens
    - Jarilinus
    - Madygenerpeton
    - Phratochronis
    - Uralerpeton
    - Suchonica
    - Laosuchus

=== Phylogeny ===
Below is the cladogram showing the preferred phylogeny of Buchwitz et al. (2012):

- Chroniosuchia
  - Madygenerpeton
  - - Chroniosaurus dongusensis
    - - Chroniosaurus levis
      - - Suchonica
        - Jarilinus
        - Chroniosuchus
        - - Uralerpeton
          - Bystrowianidae
            - - Synesuchus
              - Bystrowiella
            - - Bystrowiana
              - - Axitectum
                - Dromotectum

== Gallery ==
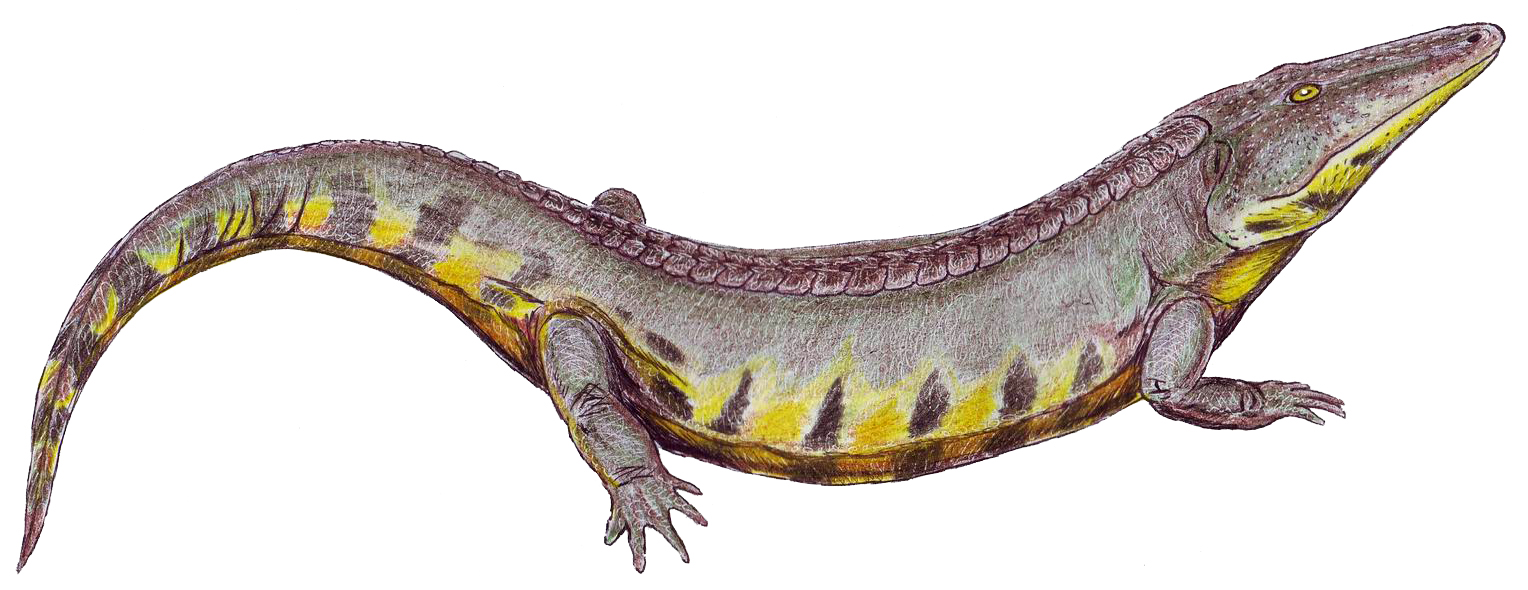
Bystrowiana permira

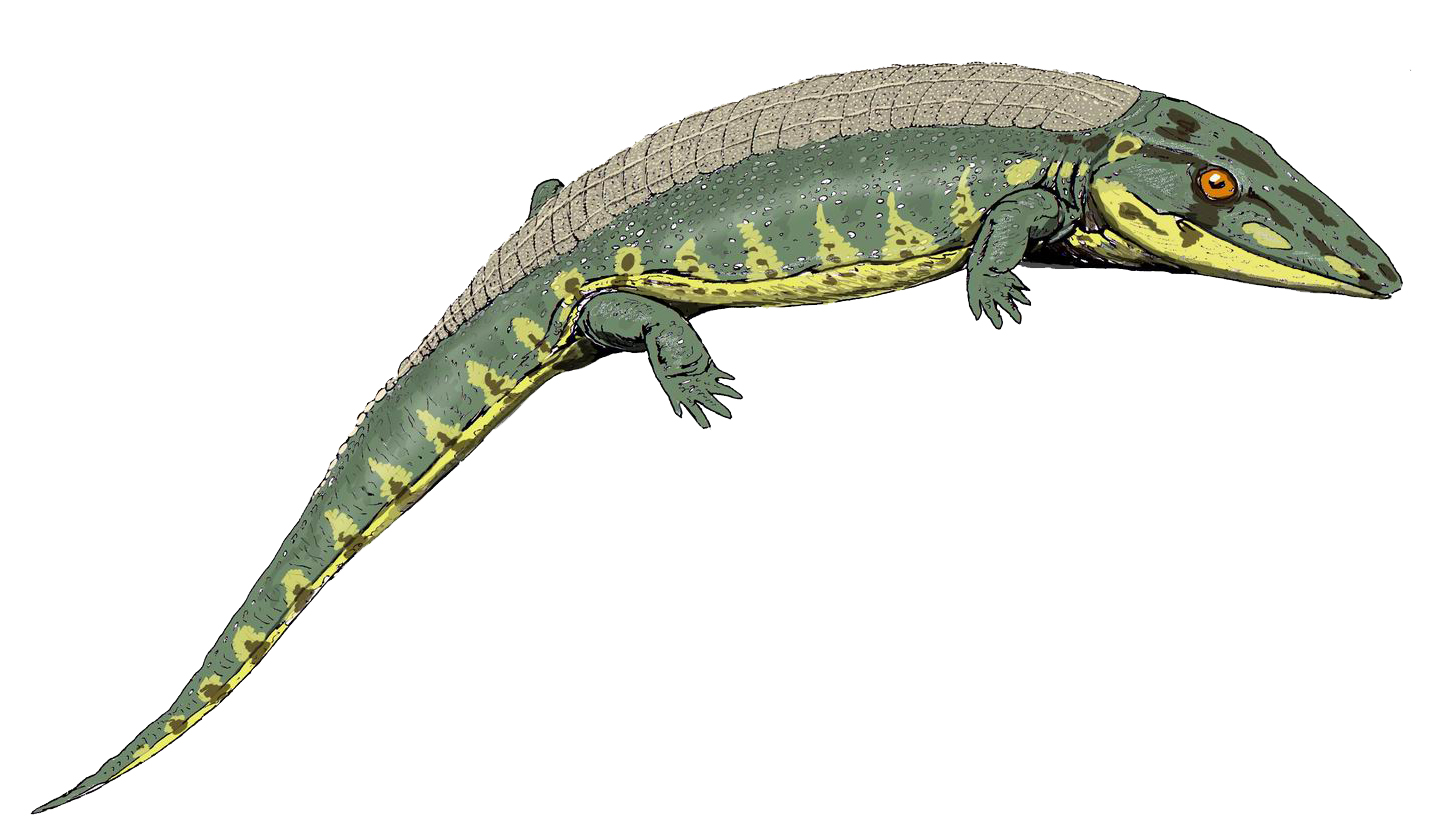
Chroniosaurus dongusensis

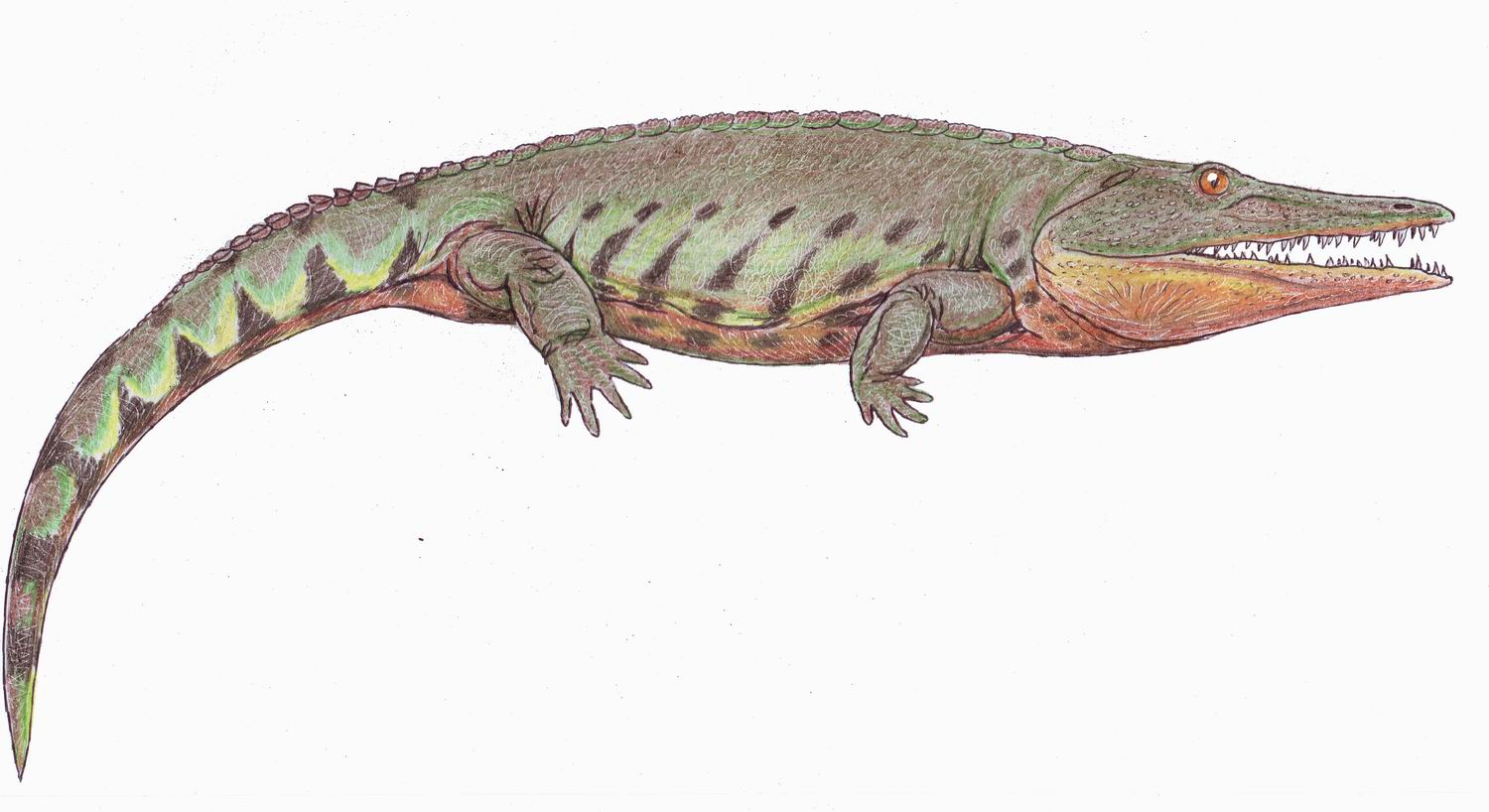
Uralerpeton tverdokhlebovae

== See also ==
- Permian tetrapods
