= Batrachosauria =

Batrachosauria Temporal range: Carboniferous - Recent (includes amniotes)

Scientific classification
- Kingdom: Animalia
- Phylum: Chordata
- Order: Anthracosauria
- Clade: Batrachosauria

Groups
- Seymouriamorpha; Cotylosauria; Solenodonsaurus; Westlothiana lizziae Diadectomorpha; Amniota

Taxon of tetrapodomorphs

Batrachosauria ("Frog Saurians") is a name given either to very reptile-like amphibians dating from the Carboniferous and Permian periods, or to amniotes and those amphibians very closely related to them. In current cladistic schemes, Batrachosauria is the sister clade to the Anthracosauroidea.

== Characteristics ==
From the Palaeos website:

- Intercentrum reduced
- large canine-like maxillary tooth

== See also ==
- Reptiliomorpha
