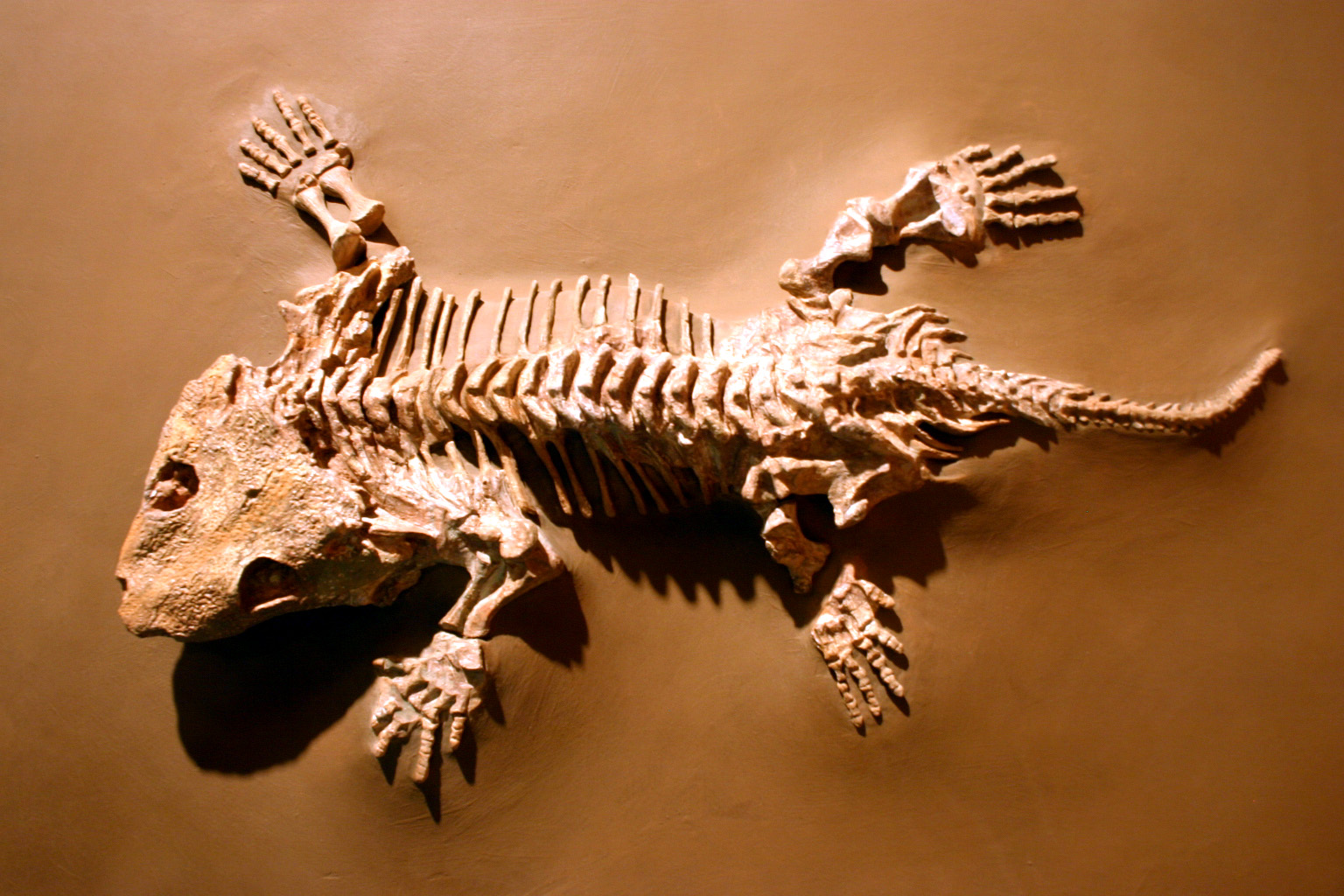
- The skeleton of Seymouria baylorensis

Scientific classification
- Domain: Eukaryota
- Kingdom: Animalia
- Phylum: Chordata
- Clade: Sarcopterygii
- Clade: Tetrapodomorpha
- Clade: Stegocephali
- Order: Anthracosauria; Säve-Söderbergh, 1934

Subgroups
- Eoherpeton?; Embolomeri?; Silvanerpeton?; Eldeceeon?; Chroniosuchia?; Gephyrostegidae?; Seymouriamorpha?; Solenodonsaurus?; Diadectomorpha?; Casineria?

= Anthracosauria =

Anthracosaurs Temporal range: Mississippian to Late Triassic 330–230 Ma

Paraphyletic group of tetrapodomorphs

Anthracosauria is a paraphyletic order of extinct reptile-like amphibians (in the broad sense) that flourished during the Carboniferous and early Permian periods, although precisely which species are included depends on one's definition of the taxon. "Anthracosauria" is sometimes used to refer to all tetrapods more closely related to amniotes such as reptiles, mammals, and birds, than to lissamphibians such as frogs and salamanders. An equivalent term to this definition would be Reptiliomorpha. Anthracosauria has also been used to refer to a smaller group of large, crocodilian-like aquatic tetrapods also known as embolomeres.

== Various definitions ==
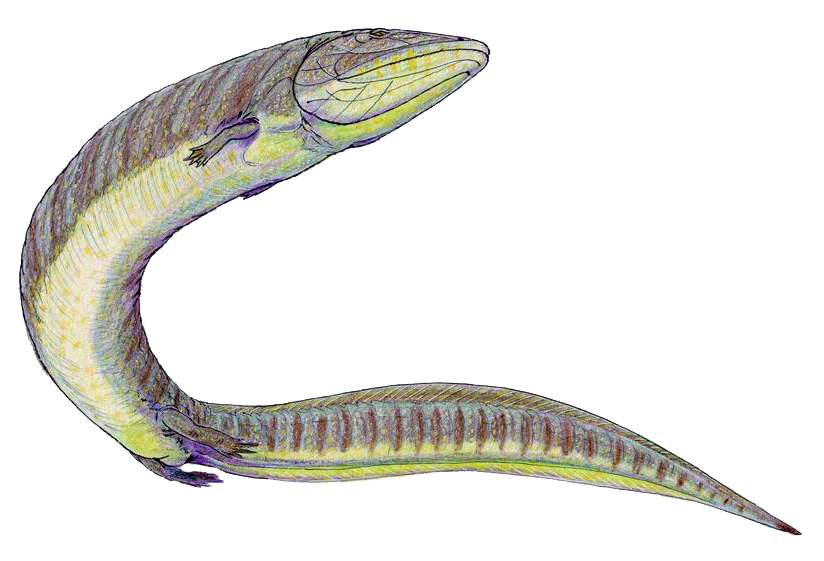
Pteroplax, an embolomere

As originally defined by Säve-Söderbergh in 1934, the anthracosaurs are a group of usually large aquatic Amphibia from the Carboniferous and lower Permian. As defined by Alfred Sherwood Romer however, the anthracosaurs include all non-amniote "labyrinthodont" reptile-like amphibians, and Säve-Söderbergh's definition is more equivalent to Romer's suborder Embolomeri. This definition was also used by Edwin H. Colbert and Robert L. Carroll in their textbooks of Vertebrate Palaeontology (Colbert 1969, Carroll 1988). Dr A. L. Panchen however preferred Säve-Söderbergh's original definition of Antracosauria in his Handbuch der Paläoherpetologie, 1970.

With cladistics things have changed again. Gauthier, Kluge and Rowe (1988) defined Anthracosauria as a clade including "Amniota plus all other tetrapods that are more closely related to amniotes than they are to amphibians" (Amphibia in turn was defined by these authors as a clade including Lissamphibia and those tetrapods that are more closely related to lissamphibians than they are to amniotes). Similarly, Michel Laurin (1996) uses the term in a cladistic sense to refer to only the most advanced reptile-like amphibians. Thus his definition includes Diadectomorpha, Solenodonsauridae and the amniotes. As Ruta, Coates and Quicke (2003) pointed out, this definition is problematic, because, depending on the exact phylogenetic position of Lissamphibia within Tetrapoda, using it might lead to the situation where some taxa traditionally classified as anthracosaurs, including even the genus Anthracosaurus itself, wouldn't belong to Anthracosauria. Laurin (2001) created a different phylogenetic definition of Anthracosauria, defining it as "the largest clade that includes Anthracosaurus russelli but not Ascaphus truei". However, Michael Benton (2000, 2004) makes the anthracosaurs a paraphyletic order within the superorder Reptiliomorpha, along with the orders Seymouriamorpha and Diadectomorpha, thus making the Anthracosaurians the "lower" reptile-like amphibians. In his definition, the group encompass the Embolomeri, Chroniosuchia and possibly the family Gephyrostegidae.

Many studies since have suggested that anthracosaurs or embolomeres are likely reptiliomorphs closer to amniotes, but some recent studies either retain them as amphibians or argue that their relationships are still ambiguous and are more likely to be stem-tetrapods.

== Etymology ==
The name "Anthracosauria" is Greek ('coal lizards'), because many of its fossils were found in the Coal Measures.

== References and external links ==
- Benton, M. J. (2004), Vertebrate Palaeontology, Blackwell Science Ltd 3rd ed. - see also taxonomic hierarchy of the vertebrates, according to Benton 2004
- Carroll, R. L., 1988: Vertebrate Paleontology and Evolution. W. H. Freeman and company, New York
- Clack, J. A. (2002), Gaining Ground: the Origin and Evolution of Tetrapods Indiana Univ. Press, 369 pp.
- Colbert, E. H. (1969), Evolution of the Vertebrates, John Wiley & Sons Inc (2nd ed.)
- Gauthier, J. A.; Kluge, A. G.; Rowe, T. (1988). "The early evolution of the Amniota". In M. J. Benton (ed.). The Phylogeny and Classification of the Tetrapods, Volume 1: Amphibians, Reptiles, Birds. Systematics Association Special Volume. Vol. 35A. Clarendon Press. pp. 103–155.
- Laurin, Michel (1996) Terrestrial Vertebrates - Stegocephalians: Tetrapods and other digit-bearing vertebrates
- Michel Laurin (2001). "L'utilisation de la taxonomie phylogénétique en paléontologie: avantages et inconvénients". Biosystema. 19: 197–211.
- Palaeos Anthracosauroidea
- Panchen, A. L. (1970) Handbuch der Paläoherpetologie - Encyclopedia of Paleoherpetology Part 5a - Batrachosauria (Anthracosauria), Gustav Fischer Verlag - Stuttgart & Portland, 83 pp., ISBN 3-89937-021-X web page
- Marcello Ruta, Michael I. Coates and Donald L. J. Quicke (2003). "Early tetrapod relationships revisited" (PDF). Biological Reviews. 78 (2): 251–345. doi:10.1017/S1464793102006103. PMID 12803423. S2CID 31298396.
- Systema Naturae 2000 / Classification Order Anthracosauria
