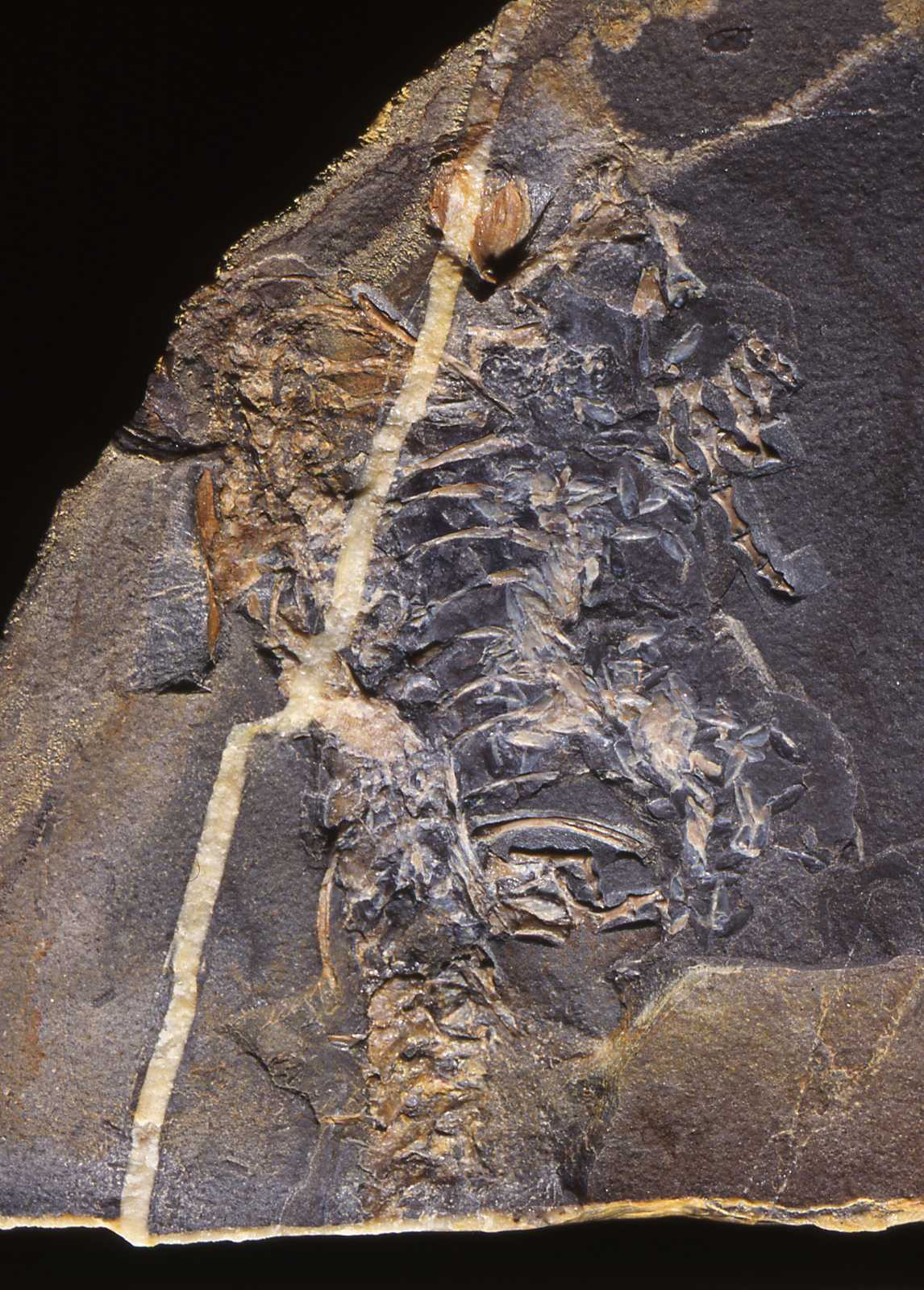
- The counterslab of the holotype fossil

Scientific classification
- Kingdom: Animalia
- Phylum: Chordata
- Clade: Eotetrapodiformes
- Clade: Elpistostegalia
- Clade: Stegocephali
- Clade: Tetrapoda
- Genus: †Casineria; Paton, Smithson & Clack, 1999

Type species
- †Casineria kiddi Paton, Smithson & Clack, 1999

= Casineria =

Casineria Temporal range: Early Carboniferous, 340–334 Ma

Species of tetrapodomorph (fossil)

Casineria is an extinct genus of tetrapod which lived about 340–334 million years ago in the Mississippian epoch of the Carboniferous period. Its generic name, Casineria, is a latinization of Cheese Bay, the site near Edinburgh, Scotland, where the holotype fossil was found. When originally described in 1999, it was identified as a transitional fossil noted for its mix of basal (amphibian-like) and advanced (reptile-like) characteristics, putting it at or very near the origin of the amniotes, the group containing all mammals, birds, modern reptiles, and other descendants of their reptile-like common ancestor. However, the sole known fossil is lacking key elements such as a skull, making exact analysis difficult. As a result, the classification of Casineria has been more controversial in analyses conducted since 1999. Other proposed affinities include a placement among the lepospondyls, seymouriamorphs, "gephyrostegids", or as a synonym of Caerorhachis, another controversial tetrapod which may have been an early temnospondyl.

== Discovery ==
Location of Cheese Bay in Great Britain

In 1992, an amateur fossil collector spotted the remnants of this four-legged creature on the shore of Cheese Bay, Scotland. For the next five years, the fossil languished at the National Museum of Scotland in Edinburgh while researchers focused on other projects. Consisting of a slab and counterslab (compression fossil) of a single partial skeleton, the fossil was cataloged with the specimen designation NMS G.1993.54.1. Around 1997, work began to expose the remainder of the fossil from the surrounding matrix. The work revealed that the animal probably lived in an environment much drier than previously understood. The findings were first reported in the April 8, 1999 edition of Nature.

== Description ==
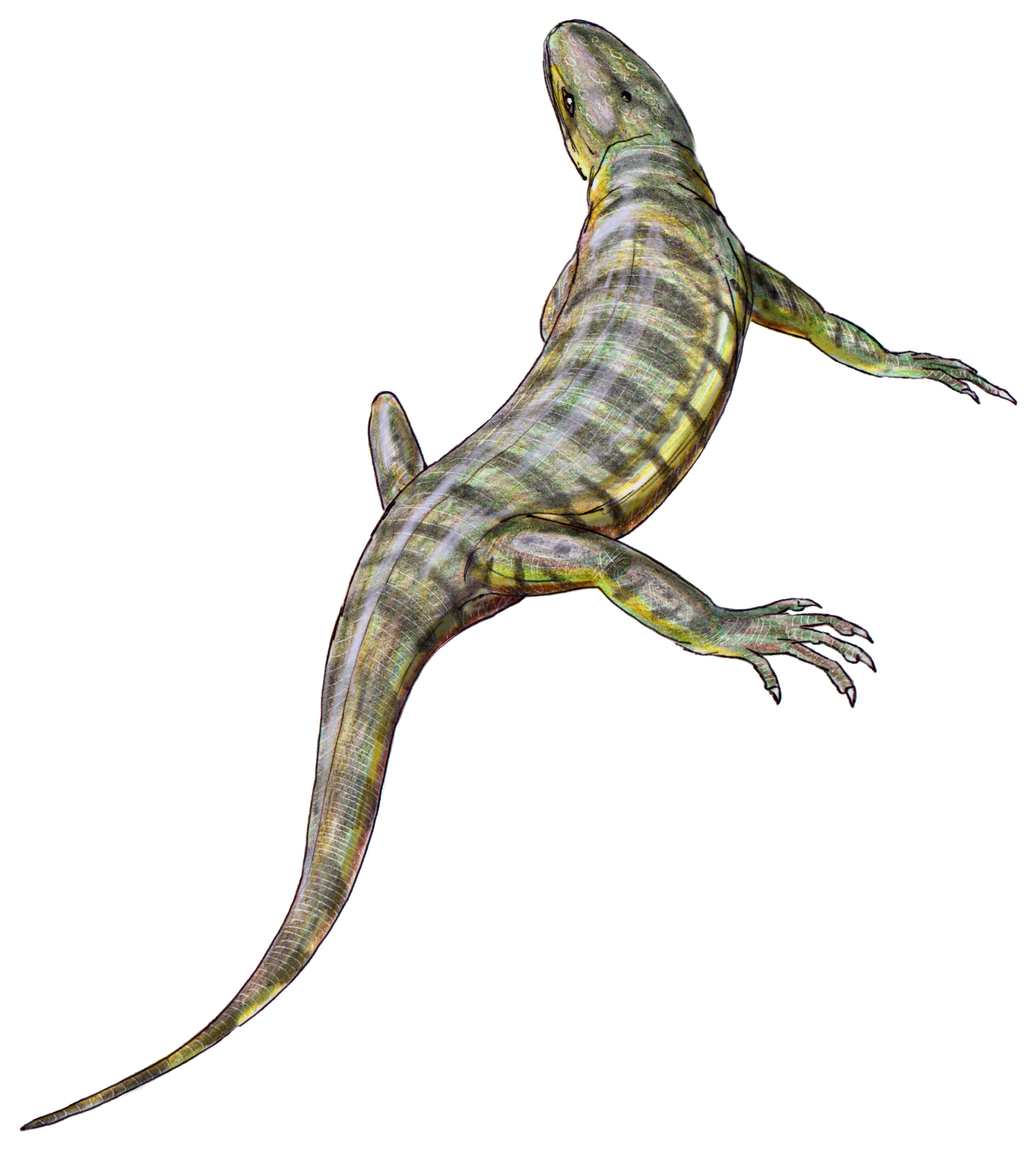
Life restoration

Casineria was a small animal with a postcrania length estimated to have been 15 centimeters. Its small size would have made it ideal for hunting the invertebrates of the Carboniferous.

Casineria had five fingers, with the bones at the finger tip being tapering and curved. This spurred the initial describers to argue that it was the oldest known animal with claws on each hand, and marks the earliest clawed foot. Claws are extremely rare among amphibians, but ubiquitous among amniotes, so their supposed presence in Casineria has been considered to be evidence towards its amniote identity. Claws are also a feature intimately bound to the formation of keratinous scales in reptiles, so in life, Casineria would have borne scaly, reptilian-type skin, and would have resembled a small lizard (despite being only distantly related to true lizards).

Under the hypothesis that it was among the first amniotes in the biological sense, it would have laid an amniotic egg not dependent on being laid in water to survive, possibly hiding them in damp vegetation or hollowed out tree stumps. This has been inferred from the fact that Casineria was found in rocks showing a rather dry environment. In the early Carboniferous period before the appearance of Casineria, vertebrates were primarily aquatic, only spending part of their time on land. Casineria was believed to be among the first vertebrates to live and reproduce on land.

However, later studies have not consistently placed Casineria as an early amniote. Even the presence of claws has been considered doubtful, as Marjanovic & Laurin (2019) noted that the finger tips were squared-off, rather than pointed.

== Classification ==
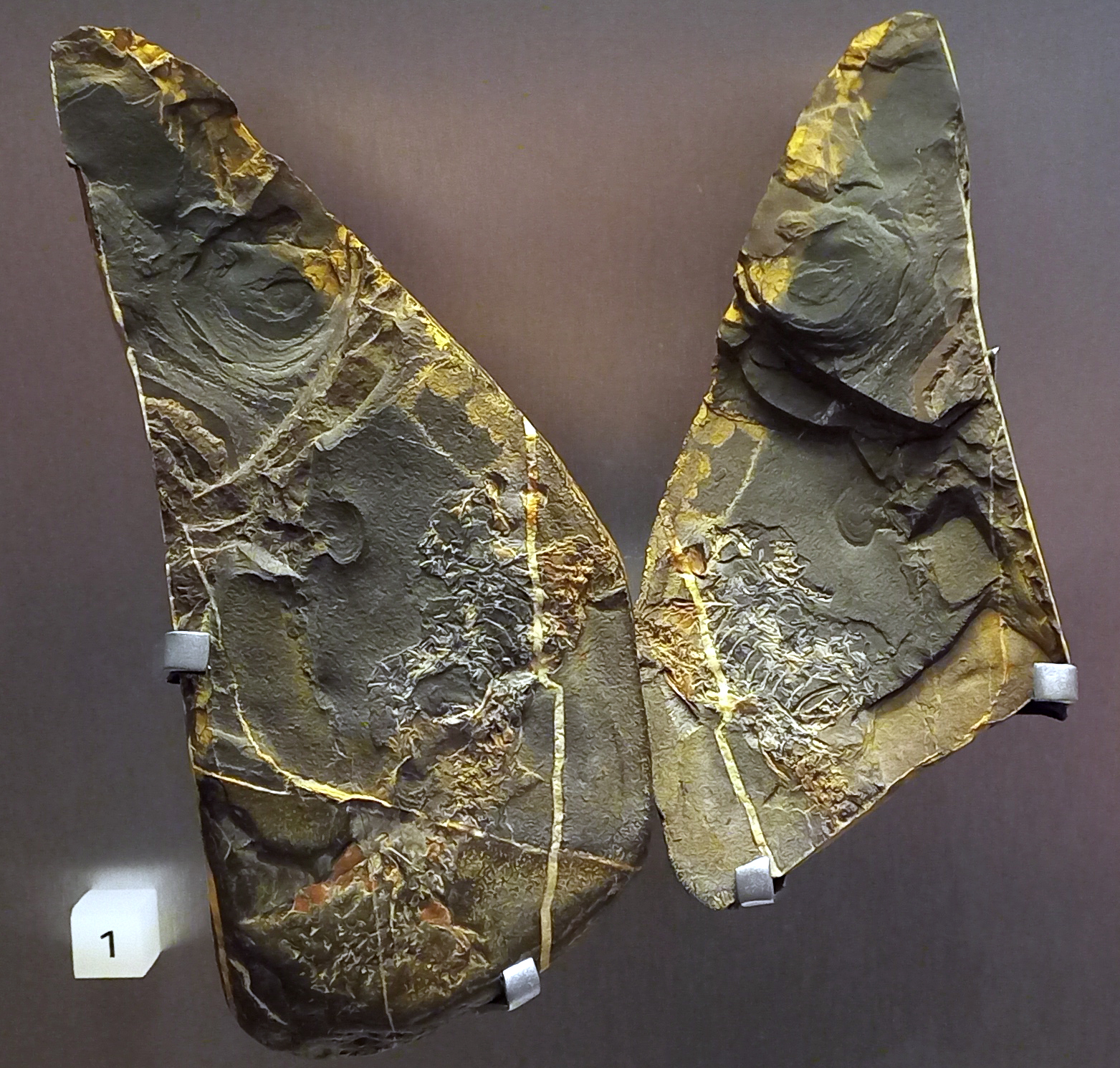
Slab and counterslab of the holotype

While retaining a general build like those found in the amphibian reptiliomorph groups like Seymouriamorpha and Diadectomorpha, Casineria also shows features that tie it in with early reptiles, notably a generally gracile build with light leg bones, unfused ankles and toes terminating in claws. This would enable the animal to use their feet actively in traction, rather than as holdfasts, an indication of a primarily terrestrial lifestyle. These traits have been argued to show that it was more closely related to amniotes than to other known reptiliomorph amphibians.

With its advanced features, Casineria may have been one of the first true amniotes, and thus the first reptile under traditional classification. In phylogenetic parlance it would have been a stem amniote, close to, but outside the crown group Amniota (the group consisting of the last common ancestor of synapsids and sauropsids and all its descendants). Casineria pushes back the origin of amniote lineages much earlier than was previously assumed. However, like with much of the basal tetrapod stock, the phylogenetic position is uncertain, and it has also been suggested Casineria is a lepospondyl, seymouriamorph, synonymous with Caerorhachis (which is possibly a basal temnospondyl amphibian), or part of a grade of small tetrapods traditionally considered the family Gephyrostegidae.

== See also ==
- Solenodonsaurus
- Westlothiana
