= Eusauropleura =

Eusauropleura Temporal range: Pennsylvanian, 311.45–306.95 Ma

Scientific classification
- Domain: Eukaryota
- Kingdom: Animalia
- Phylum: Chordata
- Order: †Gephyrostegida
- Family: †Gephyrostegidae
- Genus: †Eusauropleura; Romer, 1930

Type species
- †Sauropleura digitata Cope, 1868

Extinct genus of tetrapodomorphs

Eusauropleura is an extinct genus of gephyrostegid tetrapodomorph from the Pennsylvanian (Late Carboniferous) of Linton, Ohio. The type species and only species, Eusauropleura digitata, was first described by American paleontologist Edward Drinker Cope in 1868 as Sauropleura digitata. In 1930, paleontologist Alfred Romer placed the species in the new genus Eusauropleura. Romer considered S. digitata to be a reptile or a more primitive relative of reptiles, making it only distantly related to Sauropleura, which is a lepospondyl amphibian.

Eusauropleura is known from ribs and limb bones, but no skull is known. The holotype fossil is preserved in ventral view with a dense coating of small scales covering its underside. The arms and legs are nearly complete. It is similar in appearance to Gephyrostegus from the Czech Republic, with closely matching body proportions. Compared to Gephyrostegus, Eusauropleura has a more weakly ossified pelvis. The hand has five fingers with a phalangeal count of 2, 3, 4, 5, 4, meaning there are 2 bones in the first finger, 3 in the second, 4 in the third, 5 in the fourth, and 4 in the fifth. Romer used the phalangeal count as evidence that E. digitata was distinct from Sauropleura, since lepospondyls like Sauropleura only have four fingers on each hand.
