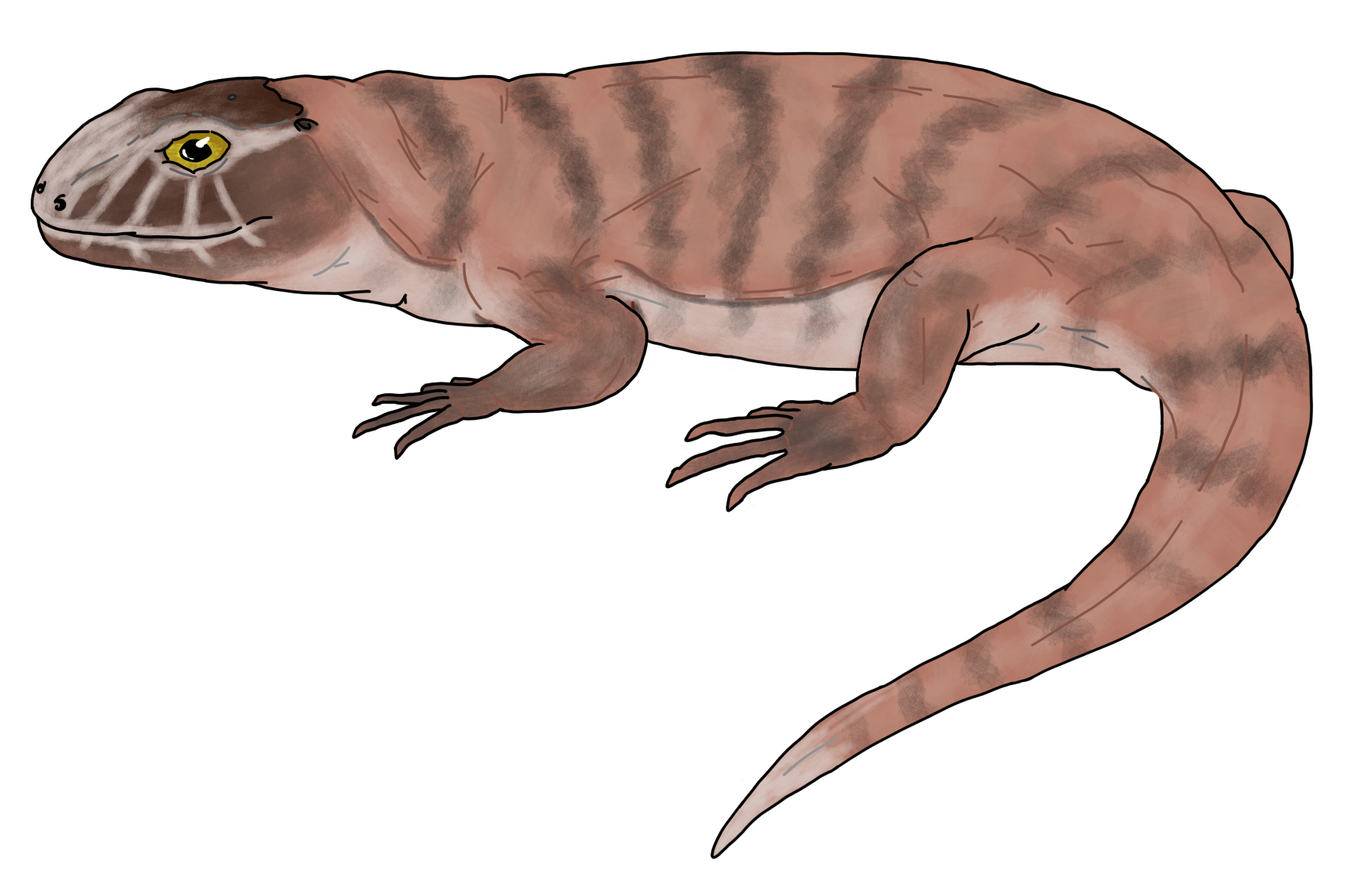
- Life restoration

Scientific classification
- Domain: Eukaryota
- Kingdom: Animalia
- Phylum: Chordata
- Clade: Tetrapoda
- Clade: Reptiliomorpha (?)
- Genus: †Eldeceeon; Smithson, 1994

Type species
- †Eldeceeon rolfei Smithson, 1994

= Eldeceeon =

Eldeceeon Temporal range: middle Mississippian (Viséan), 330 Ma

Extinct genus of reptile-like amphibians

Eldeceeon is an extinct genus of reptiliomorph from the Mississippian (early Carboniferous) of Scotland. It is known from two fossil specimens found within the Viséan-age East Kirkton Quarry in West Lothian. The type and only species, E. rolfei, was named in 1994. Eldeceeon is thought to be closely related to embolomeres, but it has several distinguishing features including long limbs and a short trunk. Initially known from two crushed partial skeletons, additional specimens have been reported by Ruta & Clack (2006). Eldeceeon was redescribed by Ruta, Clack, & Smithson (2020). The redescription supported affinities with Silvanerpeton, reconstructed a skull with larger eyes and a shorter snout, and emphasized potential correlations for an enlarge puboischiofemoralis internus 2 muscle.

== Description ==
In the East Kirkton Quarry, fossils of Eldeceeon were found alongside another reptiliomorph called Silvanerpeton. These genera are closely related to each other but represent an unusual group of reptiliomorphs that cannot be placed in any of the major reptiliomorph clades, but may be related to the earliest embolomeres. Unlike most embolomeres, which could grow over a meter long, Eldeceeon has a much smaller body length of 35 centimetres (1.15 ft). Compared to embolomeres, it has fewer dorsal vertebrae and much larger limbs relative to its body. The shortened spine and robust limbs of Eldeceeon suggest it had a terrestrial lifestyle, distinguishing it from the primarily aquatic embolomeres which have relatively long bodies and short limbs. These adaptations also distinguish it from Silvanerpeton, which is presumed to have been aquatic.

The ribs of Eldeceeon are restricted to the front half of the spine, a characteristic that is not present in any tetrapods (four-limbed vertebrates) except mammals and their relatives. Each vertebra is divided into a U-shaped pleurocentrum and a smaller intercentrum, like the vertebrae of the embolomere Eoherpeton. The pectoral and pelvic girdles resemble those of the embolomere Proterogyrinus.
