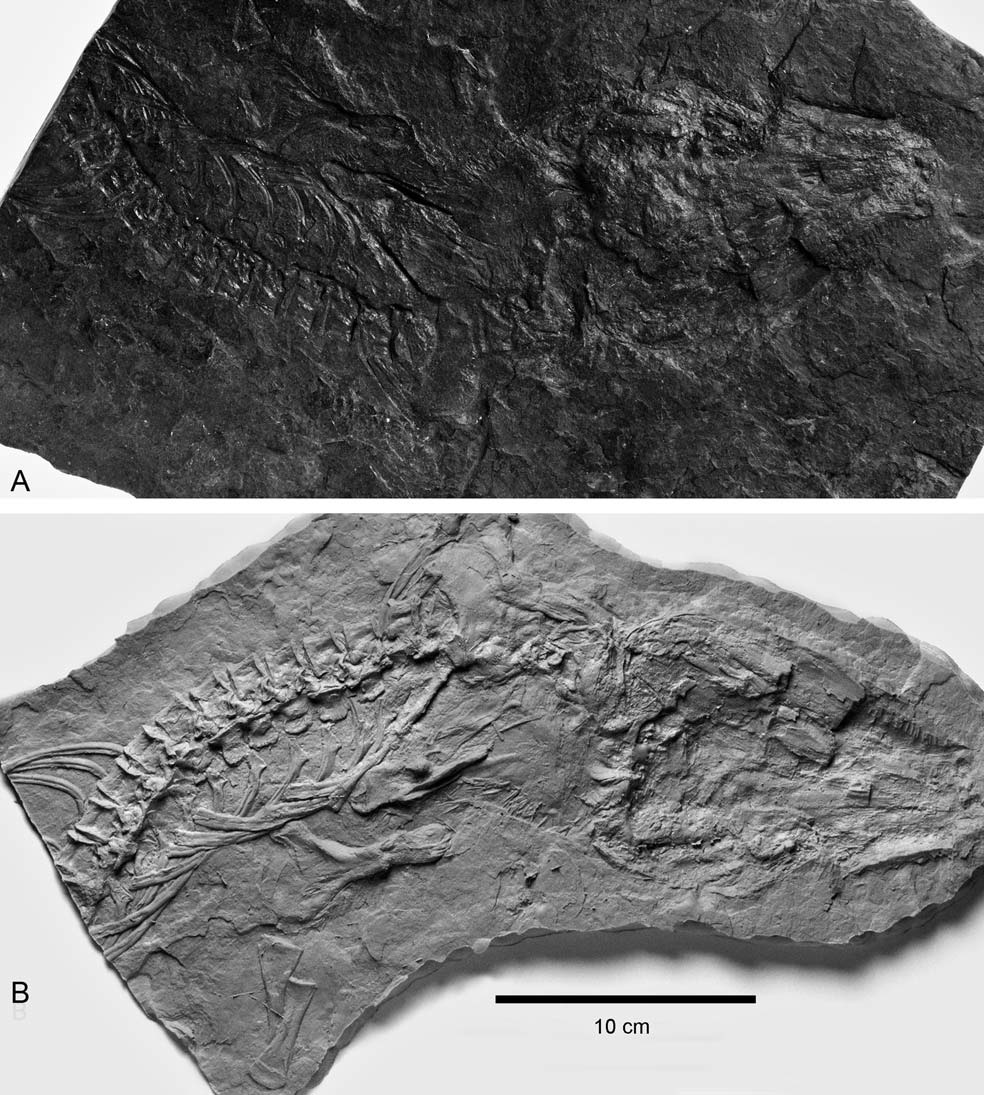
- The original fossil (A) and its plaster cast (B)

Scientific classification
- Domain: Eukaryota
- Kingdom: Animalia
- Phylum: Chordata
- Clade: Reptiliomorpha (?)
- Genus: †Solenodonsaurus; Broili, 1924

Type species
- †Solenodonsaurus janenschi Broili, 1924

= Solenodonsaurus =

Solenodonsaurus Temporal range: Westphalian, 313–304 Ma

Extinct genus of reptiles

Solenodonsaurus ("single-tooth lizard") is an extinct genus of reptiliomorphs that lived in what is now Czech Republic, during the Westphalian stage.

== Description ==
Solenondosaurus had 45 centimetres (1.48 ft) snout-vent length with a skull length 14 centimetres (0.46 ft).

Solenodonsaurus shows a curious mix of characters making it difficult to place phylogenetically. The teeth lack labyrinthodont folding of the enamel, and it skull has a much smaller otic notch than seen in other reptiliomorph amphibians. Yet general build ties it in with the Diadectomorpha.

== Paleobiology ==
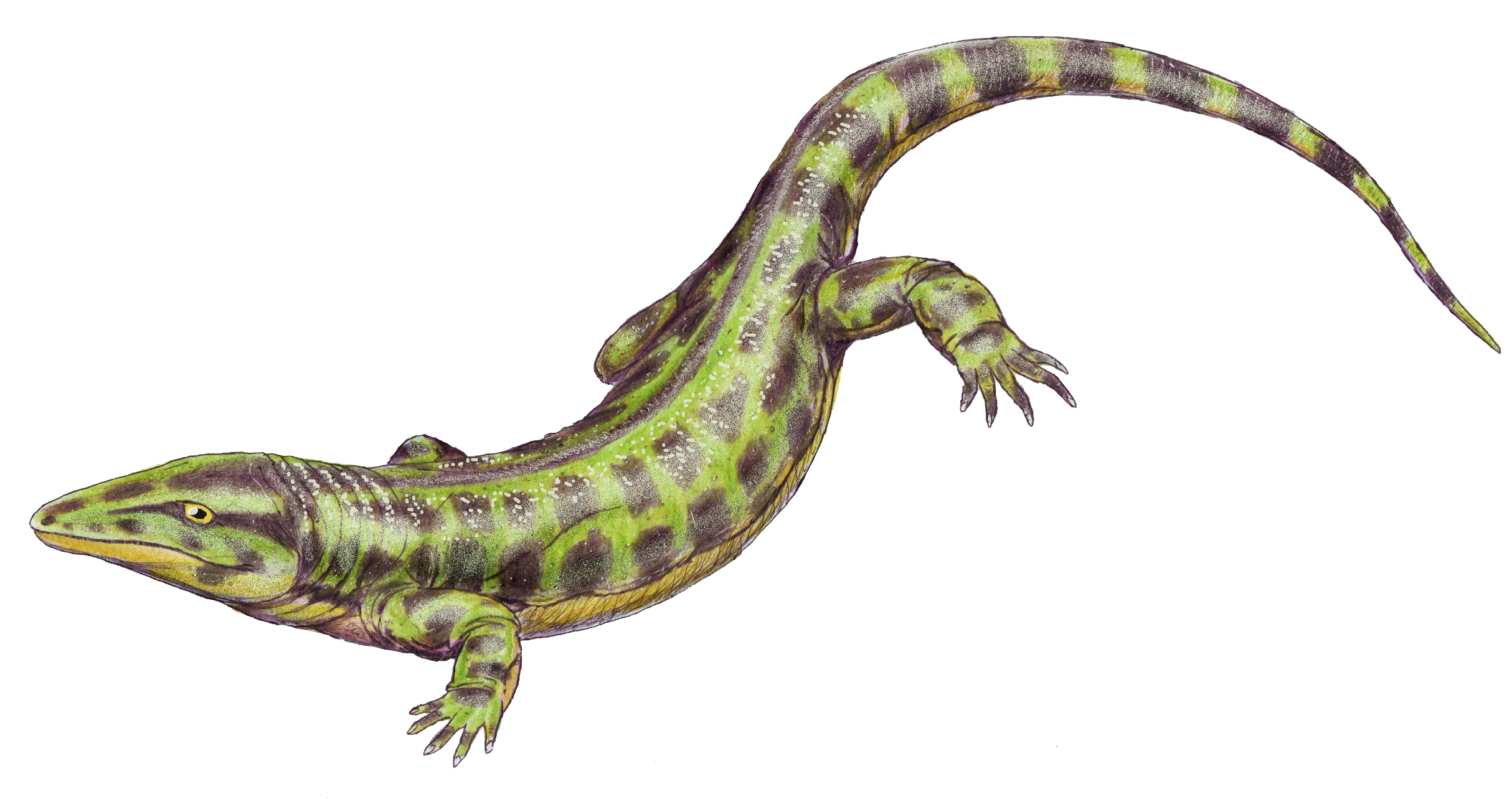
Life reconstruction by Dmitry Bogdanov

Solenodonsaurus was likely best adapted to life on land, as opposed to living in an aquatic environment like many other early tetrapods. The limbs and pelvis are incomplete in all known specimens of Solenodonsaurus, making it difficult to infer how the animal may have moved. One feature that suggests a terrestrial lifestyle is the 90° rotation of the ends of the humerus, which orients the forelimb forward rather than out to the side. Several presumably terrestrial groups of Paleozoic tetrapods, including amphibamid temnospondyls, microsaurs, and the first amniotes, have a similar degree of rotation in their humeri. The short, triangular shape of the skull of Solenodonsaurus distinguishes it from most aquatic forms, which have either long and narrow or broad and parabolic heads.

Solenodonsaurus was once believed to have had an impedance matching hearing system like those of modern tetrapods, with an eardrum-like membrane called a tympanum that covered a notch in the squamosal bone at the back of the skull. Evidence for a tympanum is seen in a ridge that runs along the squamosal notch, which may have been an attachment point for the membrane. However, since the otic notch is very small, the presence of a tympanum is now considered unlikely.

== Phylogeny ==
Solenodonsaurus is traditionally classified as a close relative of amniotes (vertebrates that lay eggs on land). However, a 2012 phylogenetic analysis of Solenodonsaurus and other early tetrapods (four-limbed vertebrates) found that it was more closely related to the amphibian group Lepospondyli. Below is a cladogram from that analysis:

- Tetrapoda
  - - Ventastega
    - Acanthostega
    - - Ichthyostega
      - - Tulerpeton
        - - - Colosteus
            - Greererpeton
          - - Crassigyrinus
            - - Whatcheeria
              - - - Baphetes
                  - Megalocephalus
                - - - Eucritta
                    - Temnospondyli (including Lissamphibia)
                  - - Caerorhachis
                    - - - Eoherpeton
                        - Embolomeri
                      - - Gephyrostegus
                        - - Bruktererpeton
                          - - Discosauriscus
                            - - Seymouria
                              - - Kotlassia
                                - - - - Diadectes
                                      - Limnoscelis
                                    - Amniota
                                  - - Westlothiana
                                    - - Solenodonsaurus
                                      - Lepospondyli

The phylogeny of early tetrapods is poorly understood.
