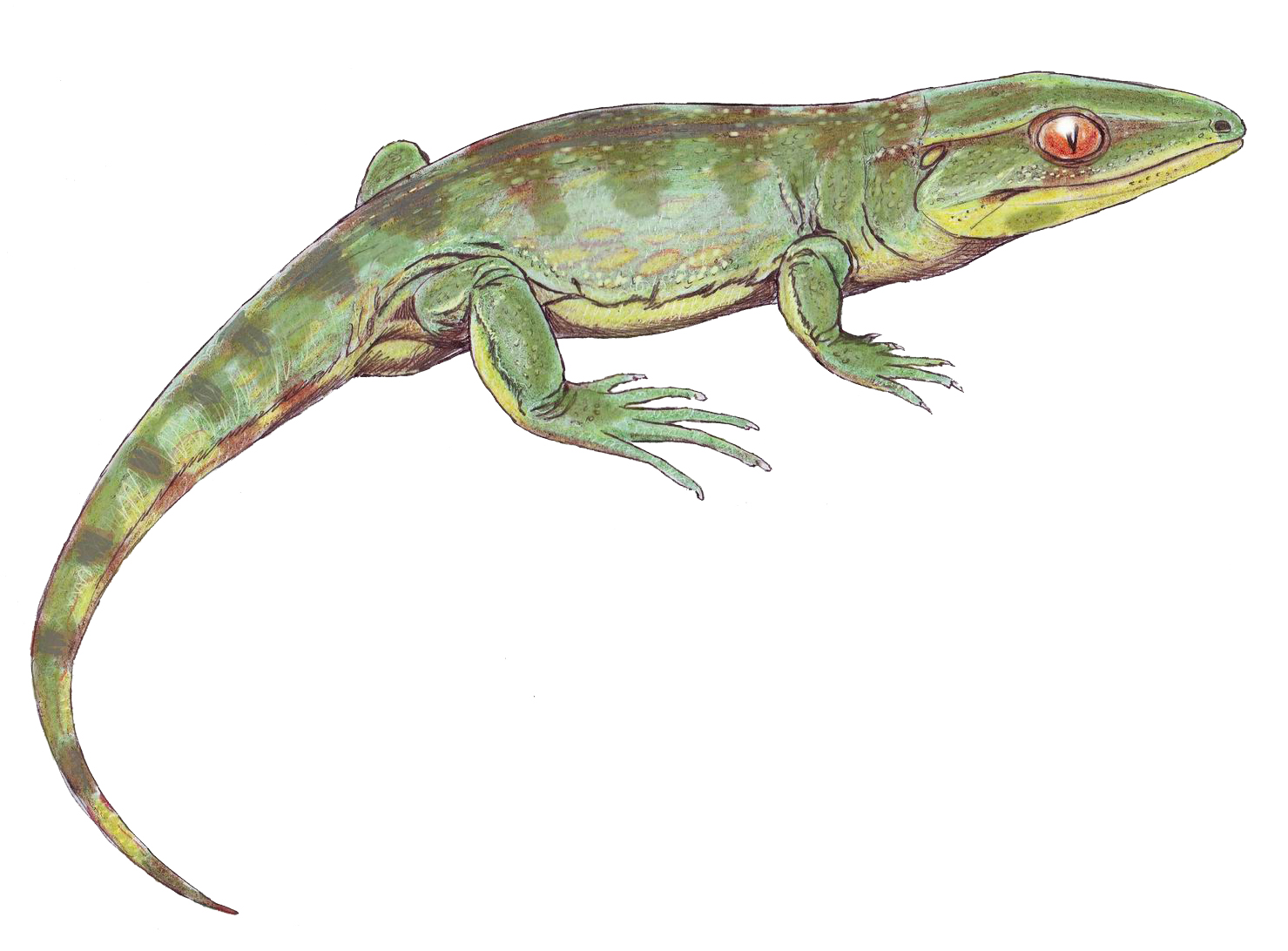
- Life restoration of Gephyrostegus bohemicus

Scientific classification
- Kingdom: Animalia
- Phylum: Chordata
- Order: †Gephyrostegida
- Family: †Gephyrostegidae
- Genus: †Gephyrostegus; Jaekel, 1902

Type species
- †Gephyrostegus bohemicus Jaekel, 1902

= Gephyrostegus =

Gephyrostegus Temporal range: Late Carboniferous

Extinct genus of reptile-like amphibians

Gephyrostegus is a genus of extinct gephyrostegid reptiliomorph amphibian. It was a small animal at 22 cm snout-vent length, of generally lizard-like build and presumably habit. It had large eyes and a large number of small, pointed teeth, indicating it was an active insectivorous hunter. The remains have been found in Nýřany, Czech Republic, dating from around 310 million years ago (upper Carboniferous).

Originally thought to have been a seymouriamorph, the phylogenetic position is uncertain, and now it is placed in the family Gephyrostegidae, together with the genus Bruktererpeton. Several phylogenetic studies indicate that Gephyrostegus is only distantly related to amniotes, more distantly than diadectomorphs, lepospondyls and seymouriamorphs were.

At 22 cm snout-vent length, Gephyrostegus is one of the smallest (if not the smallest) advanced reptiliomorphs found. The type species is Gephyrostegus bohemicus, the type of which is the specimen with its skull and scattered elements of the anterior postcranial skeleton preserved; another known specimen is an articulated postcranial skeleton, lacking only the tail and a few phalanges. Brough and Brough (1967) erected the species Gephyrostegus watsoni for a smaller, possibly juvenile individual, previously considered to be an individual of Diplovertebron punctatum. Carroll (1970, 1972) considered the holotype of Gephyrostegus watsoni to be a skeleton of an immature individual of G. bohemicus. The skeleton of the smaller individual has few of the features characterizing the skeletons of larvae of discosauriscid seymouriamorphs, and its morphology is overall very similar to that of adult specimens. Carroll (1970, 1972) states that while the skeleton of Gephyrostegus shows some adaptations for terrestrial life (e.g. in the specialization of the tarsus), it also retained some traits characteristic to aquatic non-amniote tetrapods, such the large size of the skull and the loose attachment of the vertebral elements, making it overall not as well adapted to the terrestrial environment as amniotes are. According to Carroll, Gephyrostegus probably spent a large proportion of its adult life on land, but it may be assumed that it retained aquatic reproductive habits.

Brough and Brough (1967) considered Solenodonsaurus to be a junior synonym of Gephyrostegus, but other authors consider them to be a separate genus. Some specimens classified by Brough and Brough (1967) as individuals of Gephyrostegus bohemicus were subsequently recognized as basal eureptilians; their "specimen I" became a holotype of Brouffia orientalis, while "specimen II" became a holotype of Coelostegus prothales.
