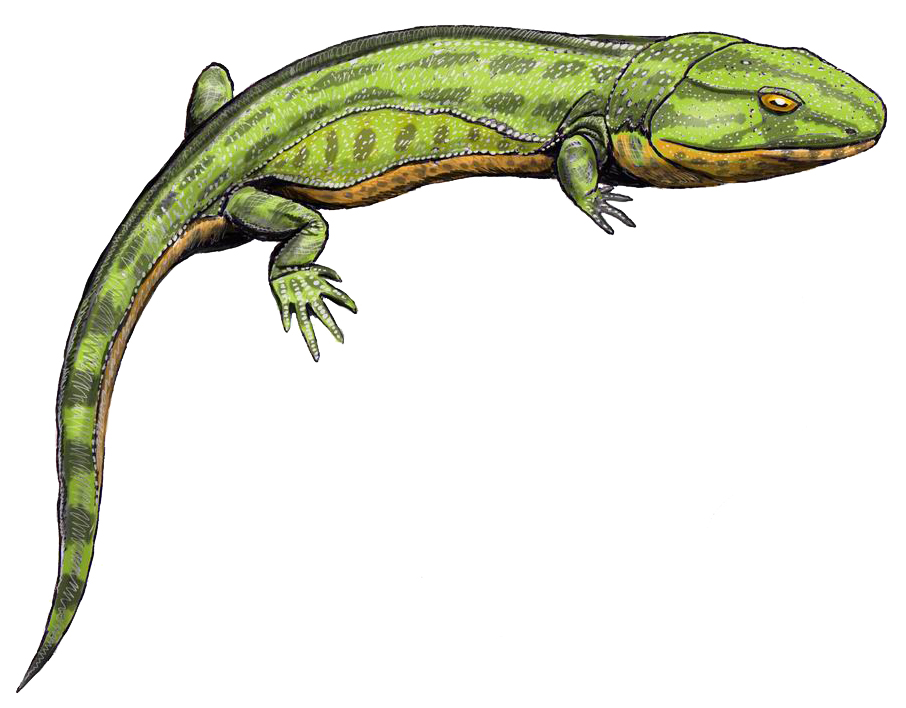
- Life restoration of Caerorhachis bairdi

Scientific classification
- Domain: Eukaryota
- Kingdom: Animalia
- Phylum: Chordata
- Clade: Sarcopterygii
- Clade: Tetrapodomorpha
- Clade: Stegocephali
- Genus: †Caerorhachis; Holmes and Carroll, 1977

Species
- †C. bairdi Holmes and Carroll, 1977 (type)

= Caerorhachis =

Caerorhachis Temporal range: Early Carboniferous 340 Ma

Extinct genus of tetrapodomorphs

Caerorhachis (meaning "suitable spine" in Greek) is an extinct genus of early tetrapod from the Early Carboniferous of Scotland, probably from the Serpukhovian stage. Its placement within Tetrapoda is uncertain, but it is generally regarded as a primitive member of the group. The type species C. bairdi was named in 1977.

== Classification ==
Caerorhachis has usually been placed as a basal anthracosaur or a close relative of anthracosaurs. In this classification, Caerorhachis is a close ancestor of amniotes, or tetrapods that lay eggs on land. Caerorhachis has also been classified as the sister taxon of temnospondyls, a large group of extinct amphibians, based on the presence of several primitive traits. In fact, when it was named in 1977, Caerorhachis was thought to be a dendrerpetontid temnospondyl.

The vertebrae of Caerorhachis are more similar to anthracosaurs, however. As in all early tetrapods, the centrum, or central part of the vertebra, is composed of two parts: the intercentrum and the pleurocentrum. While temnospondyls have large intercentra and small pleurocentra, Caerorhachis and anthracosaurs have larger pleurocentra than intercentra. A 2003 phylogenetic analysis of early tetrapods placed Caerorhachis outside the clade that included temnospondyls and anthracosaurs in an ancestral position to both groups.

== Paleobiology ==
Caerorhachis is thought to have had a primarily terrestrial lifestyle. It lacks the lateral lines across the skull that served as an adaptation for earlier aquatic tetrapods and their ancestors. The large, well developed limbs suggest it was able to move on land better than other early tetrapods like colosteids and baphetids. Robert Holmes and Robert L. Carroll, the first to describe Caerorhachis, interpreted it as "[an] animal spending much of its life in the damp mud on the margins of ponds or streams, feeding on stranded fish, or occasionally venturing into the water to catch aquatic larvae of other amphibians."
