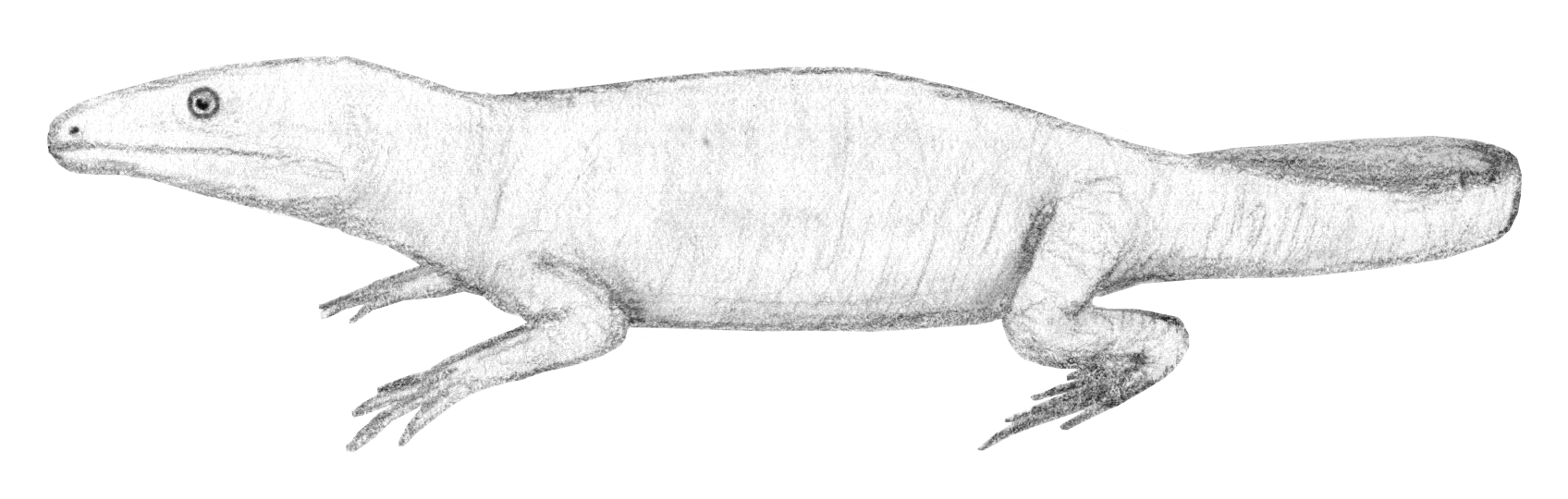

Scientific classification
- Kingdom: Animalia
- Phylum: Chordata
- Order: †Gephyrostegida
- Family: †Gephyrostegidae
- Genus: †Bruktererpeton; Boy & Bandel, 1973

Type species
- †Bruktererpeton fiebigi Boy & Bandel, 1973

= Bruktererpeton =

Bruktererpeton Temporal range: Late Carboniferous

Extinct genus of tetrapodomorphs

Bruktererpeton is an extinct genus of gephyrostegid tetrapodomorph known from the Late Carboniferous of the Rhein-Ruhr-District, western Germany. It was first described and named by Jürgen A. Boy and Klaus Bandel in 1973 and the type species is Bruktererpeton fiebigi. Recent phylogenetic analyses confirmed that Bruktererpeton is a sister taxon of the better known genus Gephyrostegus.
