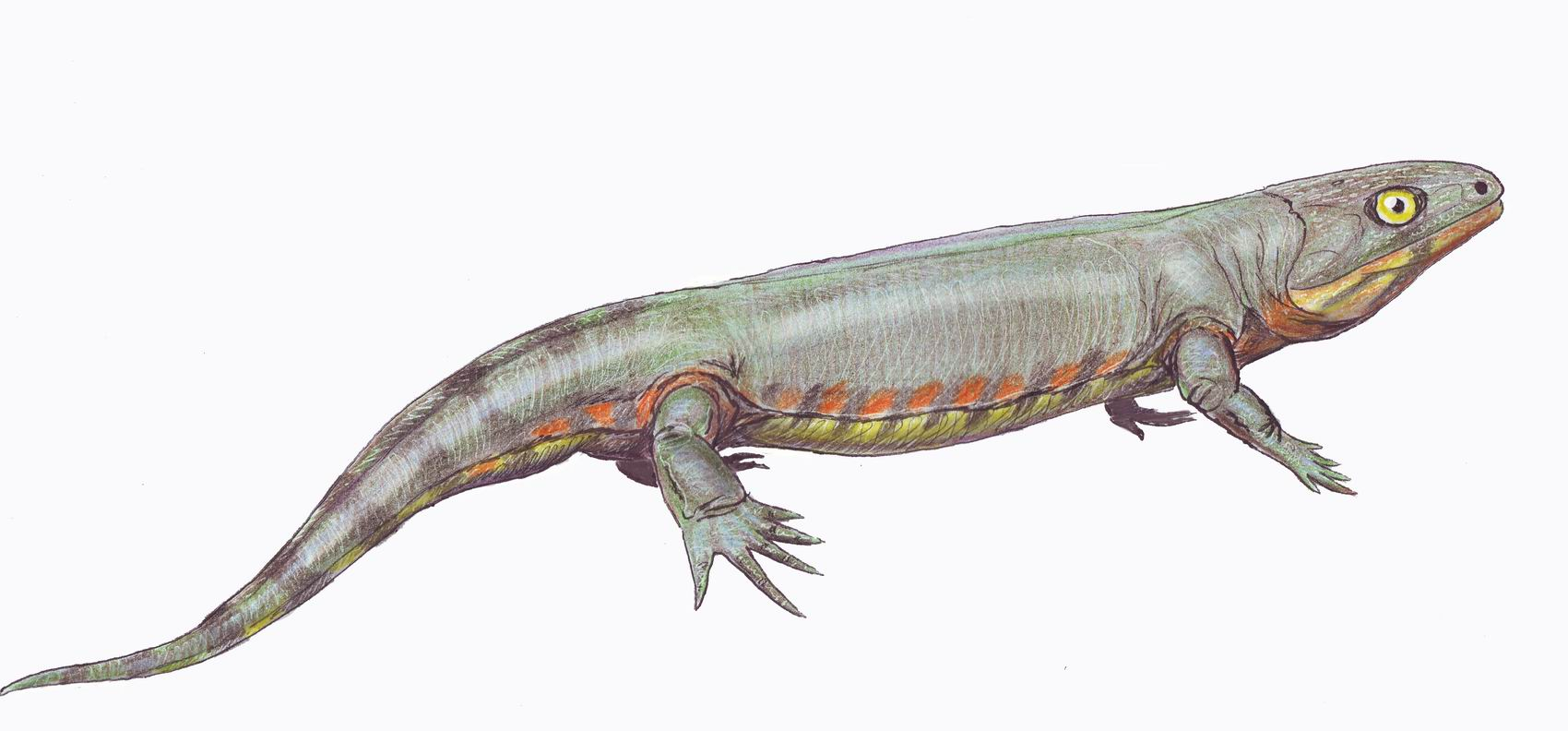
- Life restoration of Silvanerpeton miripedes

Scientific classification
- Kingdom: Animalia
- Phylum: Chordata
- Clade: Reptiliomorpha
- Genus: †Silvanerpeton; Clack, 1994

Type species
- †Silvanerpeton miripedes Clack, 1994

= Silvanerpeton =

Silvanerpeton Temporal range: Early Carboniferous Brigantian

Extinct genus of amphibians

Silvanerpeton is an extinct genus of early tetrapod found by Stan Wood in the East Kirkton Quarry of West Lothian, Scotland, in a sequence from the Brigantian substage of the Viséan (Lower Carboniferous). The find is important, as the quarry represents terrestrial deposits from Romer's gap, a period poor in fossils where the higher groups "labyrinthodonts" evolved.

The type species Silvanerpeton miripedes was named by Jennifer A. Clack in 1993/1994. The generic name is derived from Silvanus, the Roman god of woods. The specific name means "wondrous feet" in Latin. The holotype is specimen UMZC T1317, a skeleton with skull and skin impressions.

== Description ==
In life, Silvanerpeton was about 40 cm (1 ft) long. Some paleontologists think it was semi-aquatic as an adult; others believe only young individuals of Silvanerpeton were aquatic and the adults were fully terrestrial.

== Classification ==
Based on a remarkably well-preserved humerus and other traits, the animal had been believed to have been a relatively advanced reptiliomorph, close to the origin of amniotes. Recent phylogenetic analyses suggest that this placement is unsupported, and that Silvanerpeton may be among the closest relatives of Tetrapoda instead.
