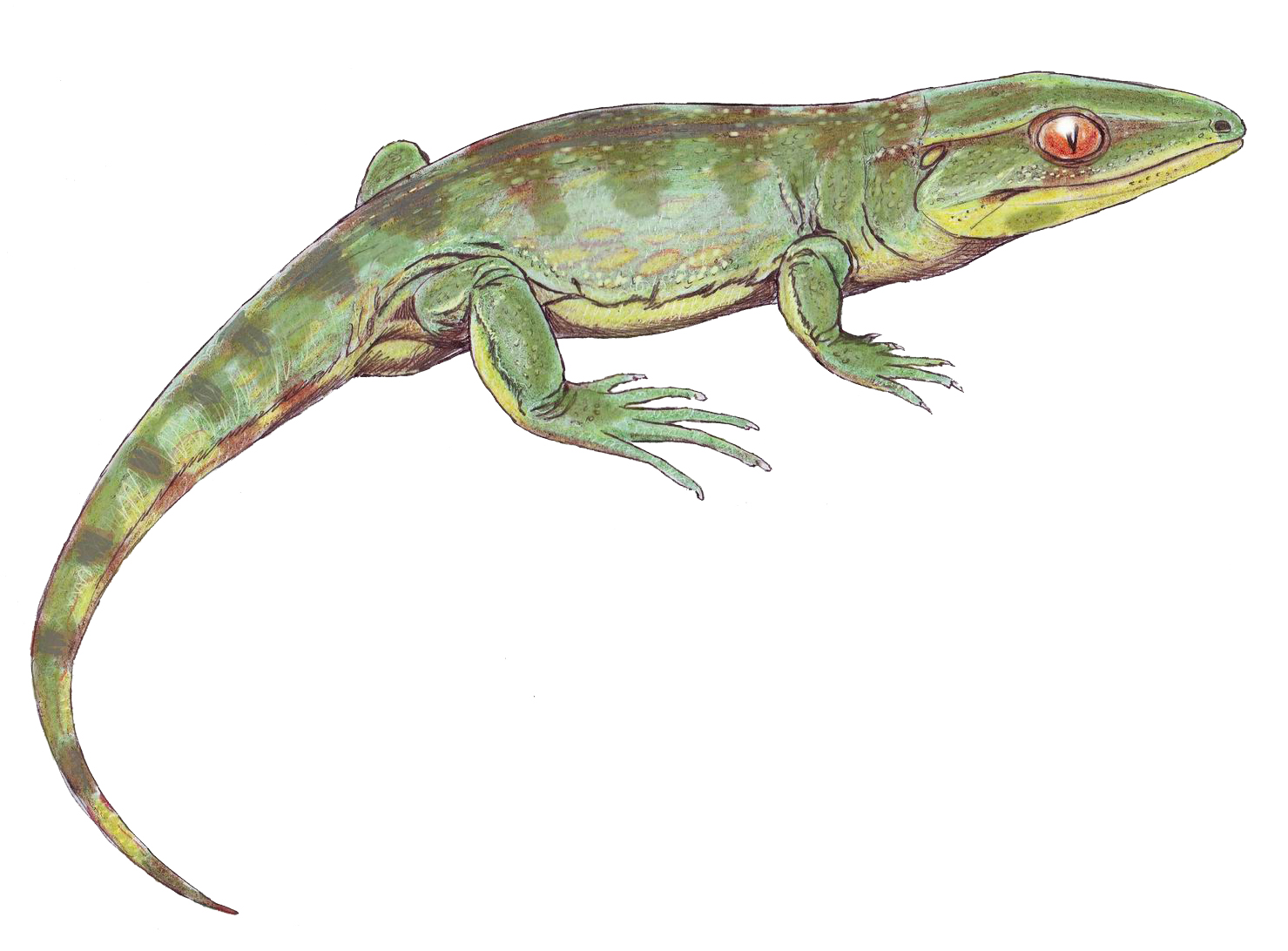
- Life restoration of Gephyrostegus bohemicus

Scientific classification
- Domain: Eukaryota
- Kingdom: Animalia
- Phylum: Chordata
- Order: †Gephyrostegida
- Family: †Gephyrostegidae; Jaeckel, 1909

= Gephyrostegidae =

Gephyrostegidae Temporal range: Late Carboniferous

Extinct family of tetrapodomorphs

Gephyrostegidae is an extinct family of stegocephalian tetrapodomorphs from the Late Carboniferous including the genera Gephyrostegus, Bruktererpeton, and Eusauropleura. Gephyrostegus is from the Czech Republic, Brukterepeton is from Germany, and Eusauropleura is from the eastern United States.
