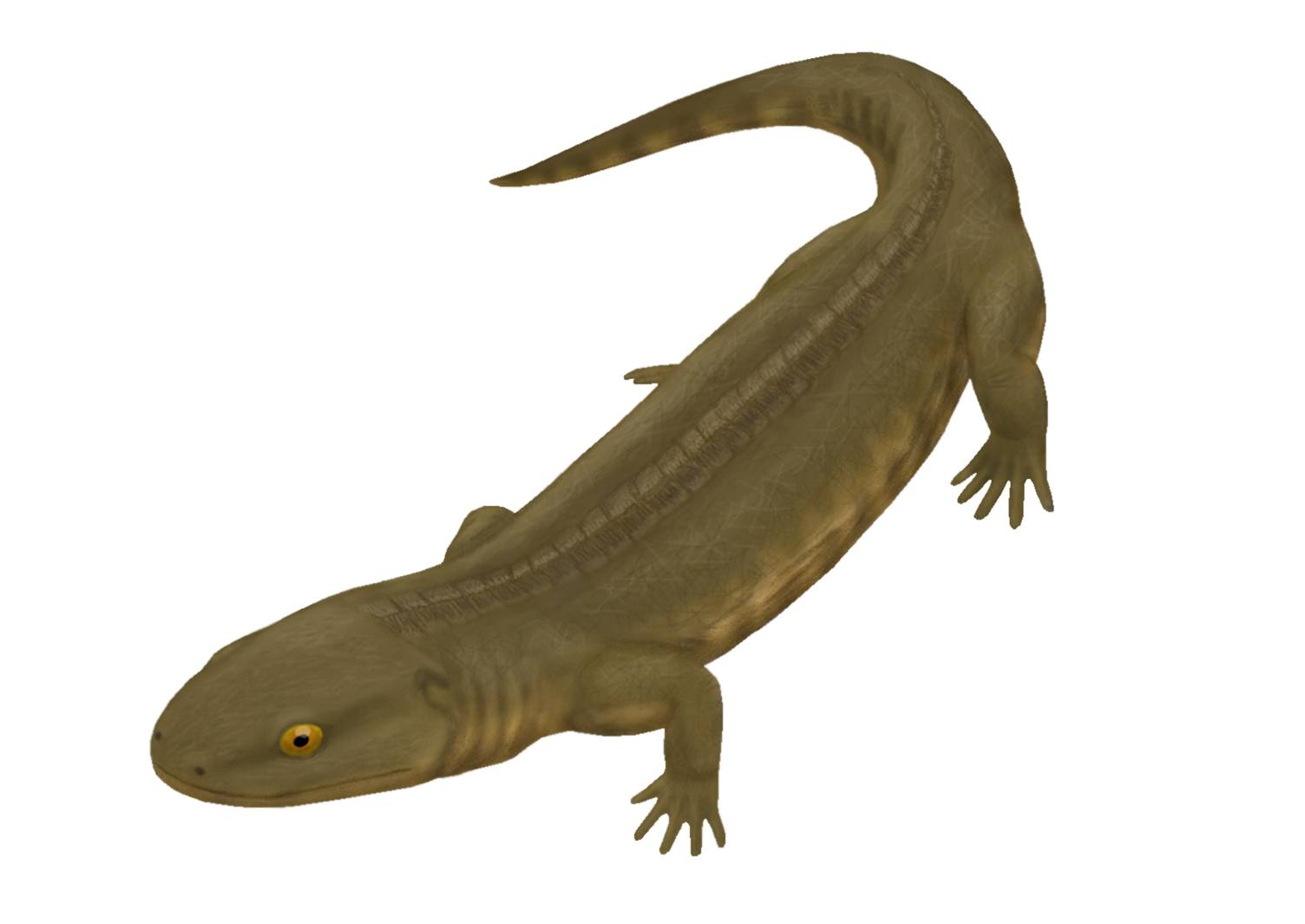

Scientific classification
- Kingdom: Animalia
- Phylum: Chordata
- Order: †Seymouriamorpha
- Family: †Discosauriscidae
- Genus: †Ariekanerpeton; Ivakhnenko, 1981

Species
- A. sigalovi Ivakhnenko, 1981 (type)

= Ariekanerpeton =

Ariekanerpeton Temporal range: Early Permian 284 Ma

Extinct genus of tetrapodomorphs

Ariekanerpeton is an extinct genus of seymouriamorph from the lower Permian. Fossils have been found from Tajikistan representing over 900 individuals of various stages of ontogenic development. However, it is thought that none of these specimens are of fully mature animals as poor bone ossification is present and the neural arches are paired and disarticulated from the pleurocentra.

Ariekanerpeton is thought to have been more closely related to Discosauriscus and Seymouria than to Utegenia due to the absence of gastralia or a postorbital-supratemporal contact. However, it is not a member of the family Discosauriscidae or the family Seymouriidae. There are no dermal scales present on post-metamorphic specimens as there are on Discosauriscus. Lateral lines are present in the skulls of larval individuals but are lost soon after metamorphosis. Unlike Utegenia and Discosauriscus, Ariekanerpeton is thought to have inhabited relatively arid environments.
