= Palpebral (bone) =

Dermal bone in the eye socket region

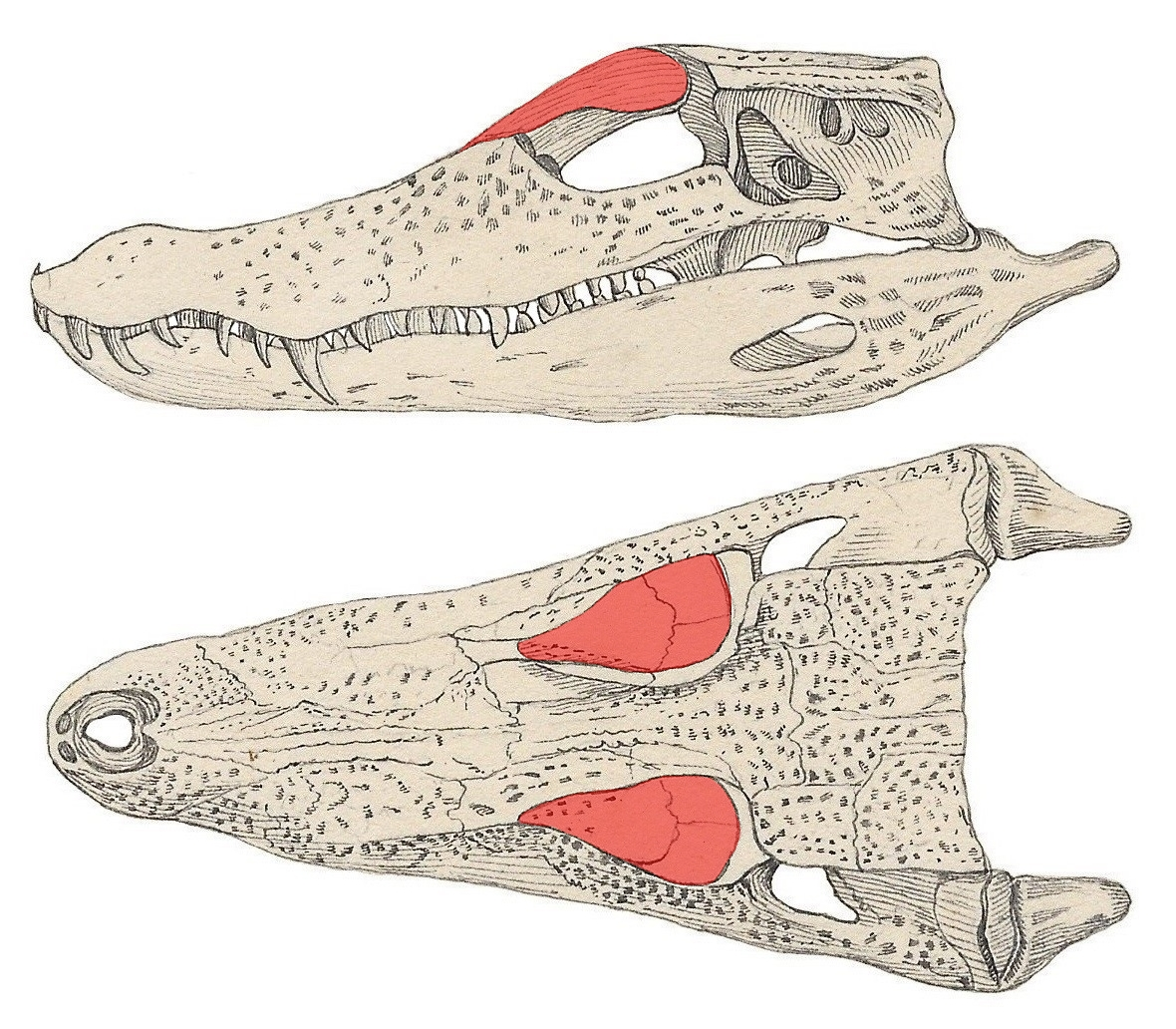
In crocodilians such as Paleosuchus, the palpebral (highlighted) is formed from one or multiple osteoderms.

The palpebral bone is a term applied to a number of small dermal bones found in the region of the eye socket in a variety of animals. The names "palpebral" and "supraorbital" have been applied to number of bones dorsal to the eye in a wide variety of taxa; many of these are known or believed to not have a homologous origin.

These bones are also known as the adlacrimal, supraciliary, parafrontal, or supraorbital, although the latter term may not be confused with the supraorbital in osteichthyan fishes. The supraorbital in osteichthyan fishes is not considered homologous with the palpebral of any tetrapods, as it arises from a cartilaginous precursor.

== Evolution ==
=== In early tetrapods ===
The non-amniote tetrapod genera Seymouria and Discosauriscus possess an element referred to as the palpebral.

=== In ornithischians ===
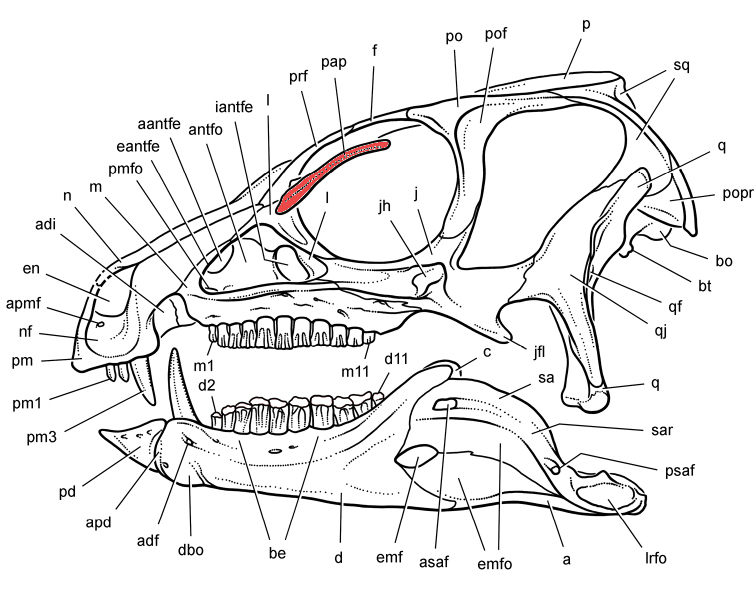
"Palpebral" bone (highlighted) of Heterodontosaurus.

In ornithischian dinosaurs, the palpebral ancestrally forms a prong that projects from the front upper corner of the orbit. The rough texture of the palpebral and of the skull bones dorsal to it (the frontal and postorbital) suggest that they functioned to support a membrane of soft tissue that made up the roof of the orbit. Ossification of this membrane led to the evolution of the middle and posterior supraorbitals and incorporated the palpebral into the skull roof as the anterior supraorbital. Because the so-called palpebral of ornithischians is not homologous with the palpebral of crocodilians, a 2012 paper by Sterling Nesbitt and colleagues recommended that the element be referred to by another name. Nevertheless, other authors have continued to refer to the element as the palpebral.

It is large in heterodontosaurids, basal ornithopods such as Thescelosaurus (as Bugenasaura) and Dryosaurus, and basal ceratopsians such as Archaeoceratops; in these animals, the prong is elongate and would have stuck out and over the eye like a bony eyebrow. As paleoartist Gregory S. Paul has noted, elongate palpebrals would have given their owners fierce-looking "eagle eyes". In such cases, the expanded palpebral may have functioned to shade the eye.

In pachycephalosaurs, hadrosaurs, ceratopsids, and later thyreophorans, the palpebral is incorporated into the skull roof.

The ossified eyelid of the ankylosaur Euoplocephalus was historically thought to be homologous to the "palpebral" of other ornithischians, but is now thought to be an osteoderm.

=== In other sauropsids ===
The palpebral bones of crocodilians develop from the upper eyelid in a process identical to that of the post-cranial osteoderms, suggesting that it is an osteoderm itself. In some crocodilians, including Osteolaemus and Paleosuchus, multiple palpebrals may be present. In some fossil pseudosuchians, the palpebral is fully integrated into the skull roof.

Aetosaurs possess palpebrals, but it is unclear if they are homologous to those of modern crocodilians.

Palpebrals are present in various groups of lizards: lacertids, some scincoids, and anguimorphs except possibly Heloderma. A 2010 paper recommended restricting the use of the term "palpebral" to the element present in the clade autarchoglossa, and recommended the term supraorbital for the element in Loxocemus and pythons, and the term "parafrontal" for the element(s) in some geckos. The parafrontals of geckos form a number of small ossifications that differ strongly from osteoderms, develop deep to the dermis and do not correspond to the overlying scales; in some geckos which lack the parafrontals, a continuous sheet of mesenchyme is present in the same position. The palpebrals of autarchoglossans develop deep to the osteoderms when both are present.

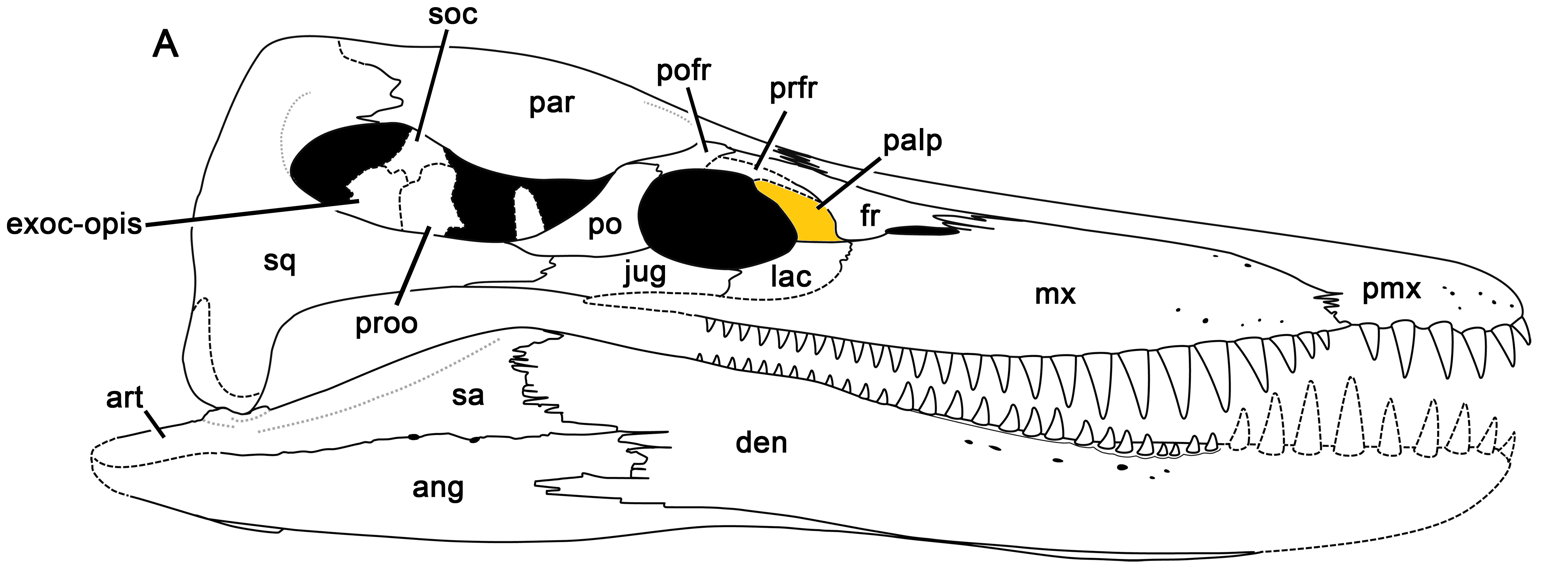
"Palpebral" bone (highlighted) of Pliosaurus.

An element informally referred to as the "palpebral" has been described among some pliosaurids. However, the identity (and indeed the presence) of this element is in question.

Elements referred to as palpebrals are also present in pterosaurs and some birds.
