= Alexander Makowsky =

Alexander Makowsky (17 December 1833 in Svitavy – 30 November 1908 in Brno) was an Austrian botanist, geologist and paleontologist.

He studied at the University of Technology in Brno, and afterwards, worked as a schoolteacher in Olomouc (1858–64) and Brno (1864–68). From 1873 to 1905 he was a professor of geology and mineralogy at the technical university in Brno.

He devoted the early part of his career to botanical studies, but his interests later switched to the areas of geology, paleontology and prehistory. Included in his research were studies of Pleistocene era humans and animals of Moravia. With Anton Rzehak, he produced a geological map of the environs of Brno, titled Geologische Karte der Umgebung von Brünn (1883). The discosauriscid seymouriamorph Makowskia laticephala commemorates his name.

In 1910, his brother-in-law Franz Bartsch bequeathed Makowsky's herbarium to the Zoological-Botanical Society in Vienna.

== Selected works ==
- Die Sumpf- und Uferflora von Olmütz, 1860 – Marsh and riparian flora of Olmütz.
- Die Flora des Brünner Kreises, nach pflanzengeographischen Principien, 1862 – The flora of the Brünn area, according to phytogeographical principles.
- Darwin's Theorie der organischen Schöpfung (1865) – vorgetragen in der Sitzung des naturforschenden Vereins vom 11. Jänner 1865 von Alexander Makowsky
- Die Wasserpest (1869) – ein Beitrag, gehalten in der Plenarsitzung des Naturforschenden Vereines in Brünn am 13. October 1869
- Mährens Gesteine in terminologischer Anordnung für die Weltausstellung in Wien (1873) – Unterrichts-Abtheilung
- Der Boden von Brünn (1875) – Vortrag des Alexander Makowsky im Verein praktischer Aerzte in Brünn. Separate: Tagesbote aus Mähren und Schlesien, Nr. 156, 157 und 158.
- Die vulkanische Eifel (1875) – eine geologische Skizze : vorgetragen in der Sitzung des naturforschenden Vereines in Brünn am 11. Februar 1875.
- Geologischer Führer für die Umgebung von Brünn (1877) – Excursion Nr. 2. 30. September bis 2. October
- Bericht über den Meteoritenfall bei Tieschitz in Mähren, 1878 – Report on the meteorite fall at Tieschitz in Moravia.
- Die erloschenen Vulkane Nord-Mährens und Öst. Schlesiens (1883)
- Die Tropfsteinhöhle von Saubsdorf in österr. Schlesien. Freiwaldau (1885) – Mährisch-schlesischer Sudeten-Gebirgsverein
- Der Löss von Brünn und seine Einschlüsse an diluvialen Thieren und Menschen, 1888 – The loess of Brünn and its inclusions of Pleistocene animals and humans.
- Der diluviale Mensch in Löss von Brünn, 1889 – The diluvial man in the loess of Brünn.
- Denkschrift zur endgiltigen Lösung der Trinkwasserfrage von Brünn (1890)
- Das Rhinoceros der Diluvialzeit Mährens als Jagdthier des paläolithischen Menschen, 1897 – The rhinoceros of diluvial Moravia as a hunted animal of Palaeolithic people.
- Der Mensch der Diluvialzeit Mährens mit besonderer Berücksichtigung der in den mineralogisch-geologischen Sammlungen der k.k. technischen Hochschule in Brünn verwahrten Fundobjecte (1899)
