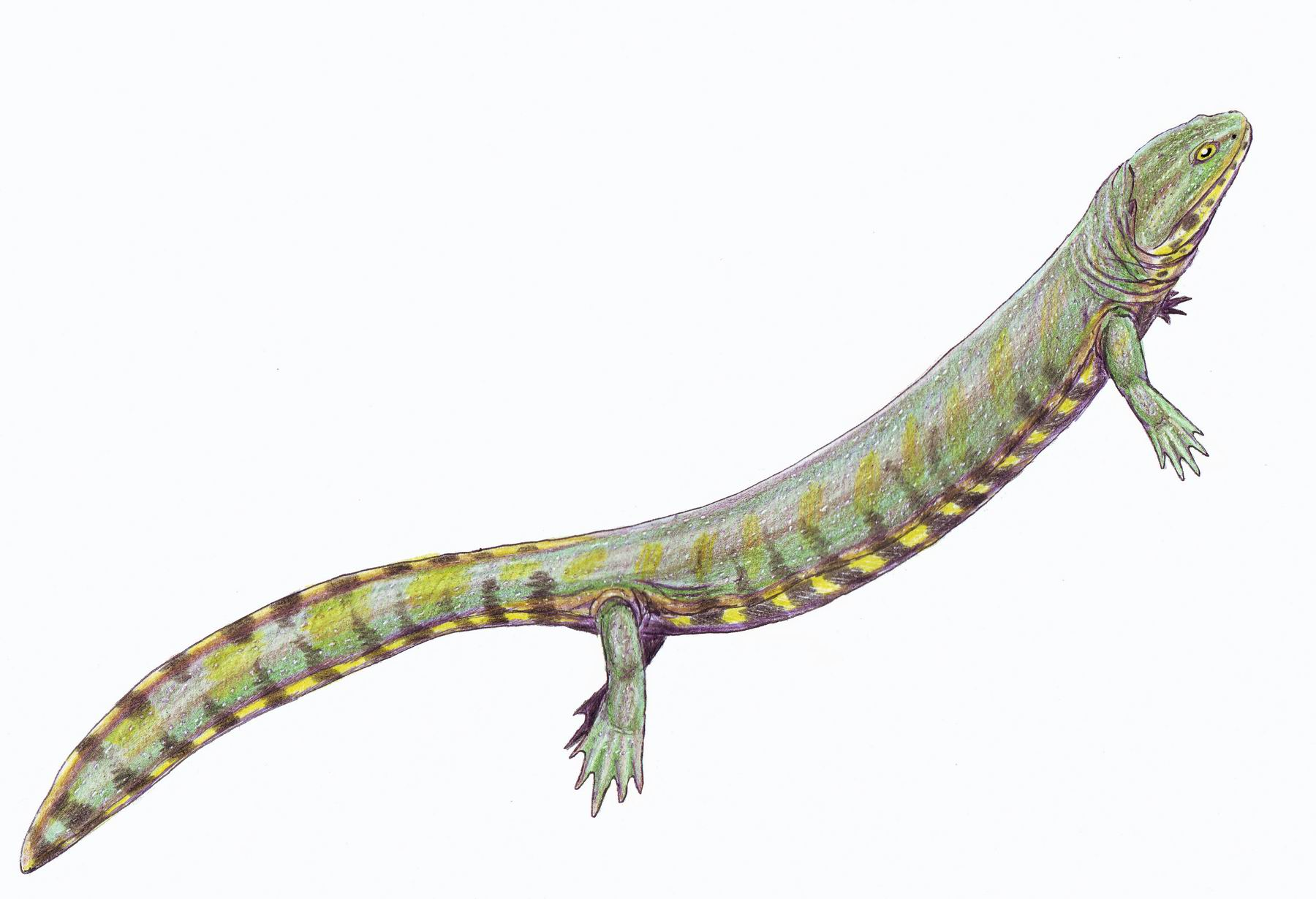
- Life reconstruction showing swimming pose

Scientific classification
- Kingdom: Animalia
- Phylum: Chordata
- Order: †Seymouriamorpha
- Family: †Kotlassiidae
- Subfamily: †Kotlassiinae
- Genus: †Kotlassia; Amalitzky, 1921
- Species: †K. prima

Binomial name
- †Kotlassia prima Amalitzky, 1921

Synonyms
- Kotlassia Amalitzky, 1898

= Kotlassia =

Kotlassia Temporal range: Late Permian, ~265.0–252.3 Ma

Genus of reptile-like amphibians

Kotlassia (meaning "of Kotlas") extinct genus of kotlassiine seymouriamorph from the Late Permian of Russia. The type, and currently only, species is K. prima.

== Discovery and naming ==
During the 1890s, Russian paleontologist Vladimir Amalitsky discovered freshwater sediments dating from the Upper Permian in Northern Dvina, Arkhangelsk Oblast, northern European Russia. The locality, known as PIN 2005, consists of a creek with sandstone and lens-shaped exposures in a bank escarpment, containing many particularly well-preserved fossil skeletons, including the holotypes of Inostrancevia and Kotlassia.

Vladimir Amalitzky named and described Kotlassia prima in 1921 on the basis of the holotype specimen, an entire skeleton, and one additional skull; the additional skull has been described ad over-prepared by Bulanov (2003). It is often incorrectly assumed that Kotlassia prima was described by Amalitzky in 1898.

A second species, K. secunda, was also named by Amalitsky (1921), but it has since been placed within the genus Karpinskiosaurus as K. secundus.

In 1935, Aleksandra Paulinovna Anna Hartmann-Weinberg falsely identified several ribs and osteoderms she found in Amalitsky’s collection, to Kotlassia prima. Later, these would actually be confirmed to be the first chroniosuchian remains. However, because of Hartmann-Weinberg’s false attribution previously attributing the ribs and osteoderms to Kotlassia, subsequent osteoderms and vertebral columns discovered later – originally belonging to chroniosuchids – would be ascribed to Kotlassia, before the corrections would be made.

== Classification ==
Kotlassia has been allied with the family Kotlassiidae, which is within the order Seymouriamorpha. It has been highly debated where exactly the Kotlassia falls into, within a phylogenetic tree, but recent analyses have chosen Kotlassia to be a basal member of Seymouriamorpha.

== Description ==
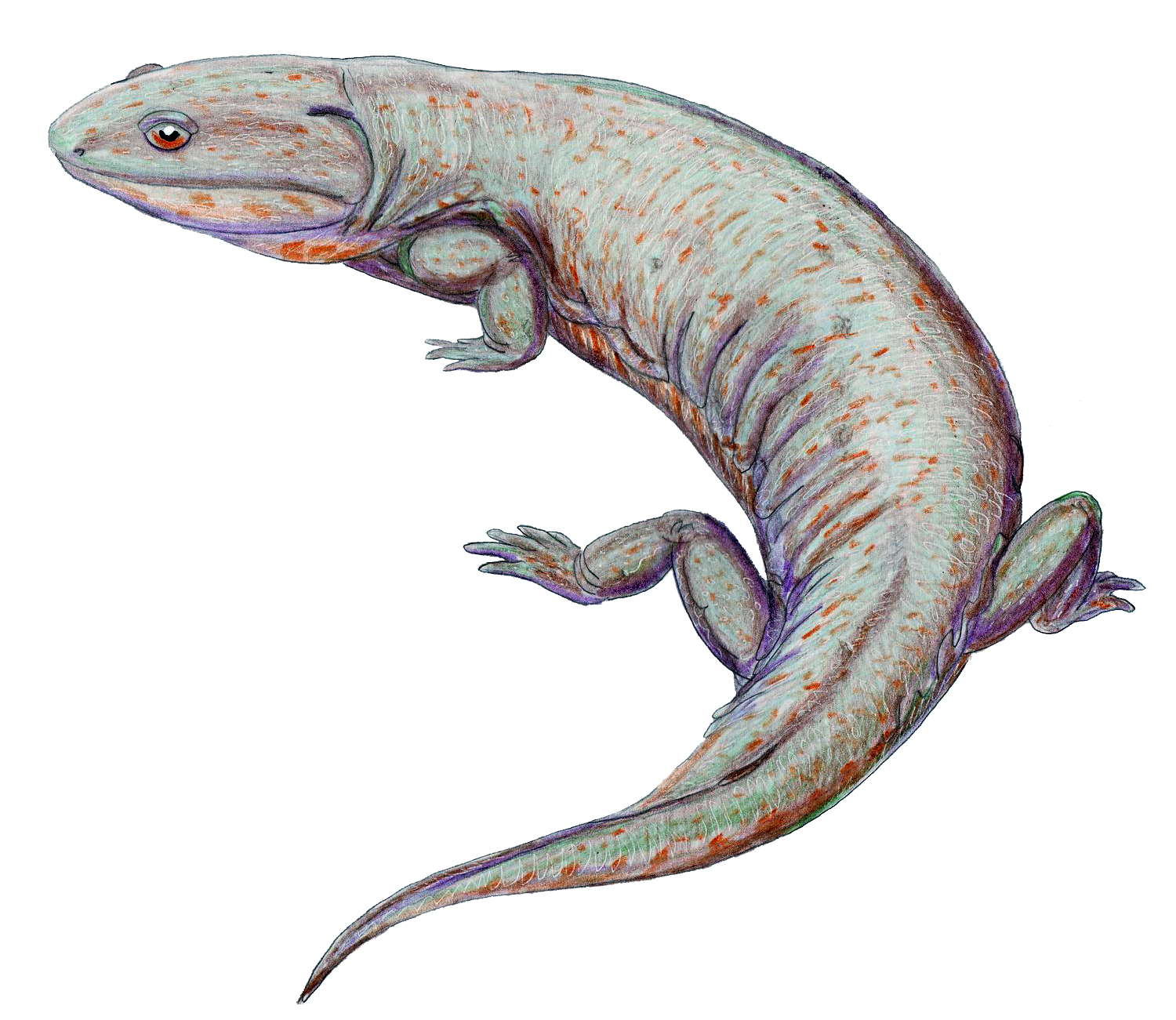
Life reconstruction showing terrestrial pose

Kotlassia grew up to around 1 metre (3.3 ft) in length, and possessed many amphibian-like characteristics.

Similar to other reptiles, Kotlassia had 2 sacral vertebrae present, however their limbs were generally smaller with a more ‘salamander-like frame’, which was indicated by its longer torso and shorter legs, hinting towards an aquatic lifestyle.

Also, the skull of Kotlassia was small, possessing a shorter rostrum, slender stapes, and more dorsally directed orbits. Additionally, while the adult form was terrestrial, it has been hypothesized that the Kotlassia had an aquatic larval stage, similar to Discosauriscus and Seymouria.

=== Skull ===
Many seymouriamorphs had sharp, slightly curved, conical teeth and palatal fangs, suggestive of a predatory lifestyle. They also had labyrinthine marginal teeth, with Kotlassia having a small row of labyrinthine teeth on the palatine and transverse bones, forming an S-shaped row on each side. The tooth size decreases gradually from the internal naris farther away. Delving into their tooth structure, Kotlassia had the same kind of folds in the dentinal walls of their teeth as the typical labyrinthodont – such as Benthosuchus sushkini. Both Kotlassia and Benthosuchus had the same number of folds, and it is assumed that due to their vastly similar tooth structures that Kotlassia had the same order of change of their teeth as B. sushkini.

The teeth of the Kotlassia are rather small, and they do not have any large tusks on the palatal bones of the skull or the lower jaw. The skull of the Kotlassia is generally short and wide, with the length of the skull being an average of 7.5 to 12.5 cm, and the width being 8.5 to 14 cm. The dermal bones which form the skull roof are similar to typical labyrinthodonts and are covered by a round-celled structure, with the round cells on some bones taking the shape of long furrows (parietal, jugal, quadratojugal, squamosal). The orbits are also quite far apart on the skull and are surrounded by 5 bones (ithe lacrimal, pre- and postfrontal, postorbital, and jugal, with the jugal being distinctly larger than the other 4), while the external naris is on the most anterior portion of the skull. There is also a large pineal opening. Additionally, the otic notch is so deep that it penetrates so far into the skull roof that there is no contact between the squamosal and tabular. The stapes of Kotlassia was a relatively small ossicle with a slightly thickened summit – which was directed towards the otic notch, assumingly united to a tympanic membrane—and wide base that is pierced by a small canal. The base of the stapes does not stay within the edges of the fenestra ovalis either, indicating that the interval between the edge of the paroccipital and stapes was covered by a cartilaginous operculum, similar to modern salamanders and frogs.

=== Vertebrae and appendicular skeleton ===
Like Seymouria, Kotlassia has a long dorsal transverse process, deep on the anterior vertebrae and shorter posteriously. The body of the vertebra is amphicoelus (doubly concave) and a narrow canal for the notochord can be seen in the center. Additionally, the neural arches are completely fused with the centrum, with the neural spine being weakly developed.

In Kotlassia, the clavicle has a large prescapular process and is strongly expanded; the external surface where the prescapular process goes off is covered with the same round cellular sculptures as the dermal bones of the skull. After passing the ventral surface of the clavicle, the round cells gradually become transformed into elongated grooves. There is also a well-developed cleithrum behind the prescapular process. As for the ilium, ischium, and pubis of Kotlassia, they are completely ossified and entirely fused with each other. The tibia and femur of Kotlassia are relatively large and long, respectively, and since the metatarsal bones have not been preserved well, it is hard to accurately determine how many phalanges it had – but it has been hypothesized to be about 4.
