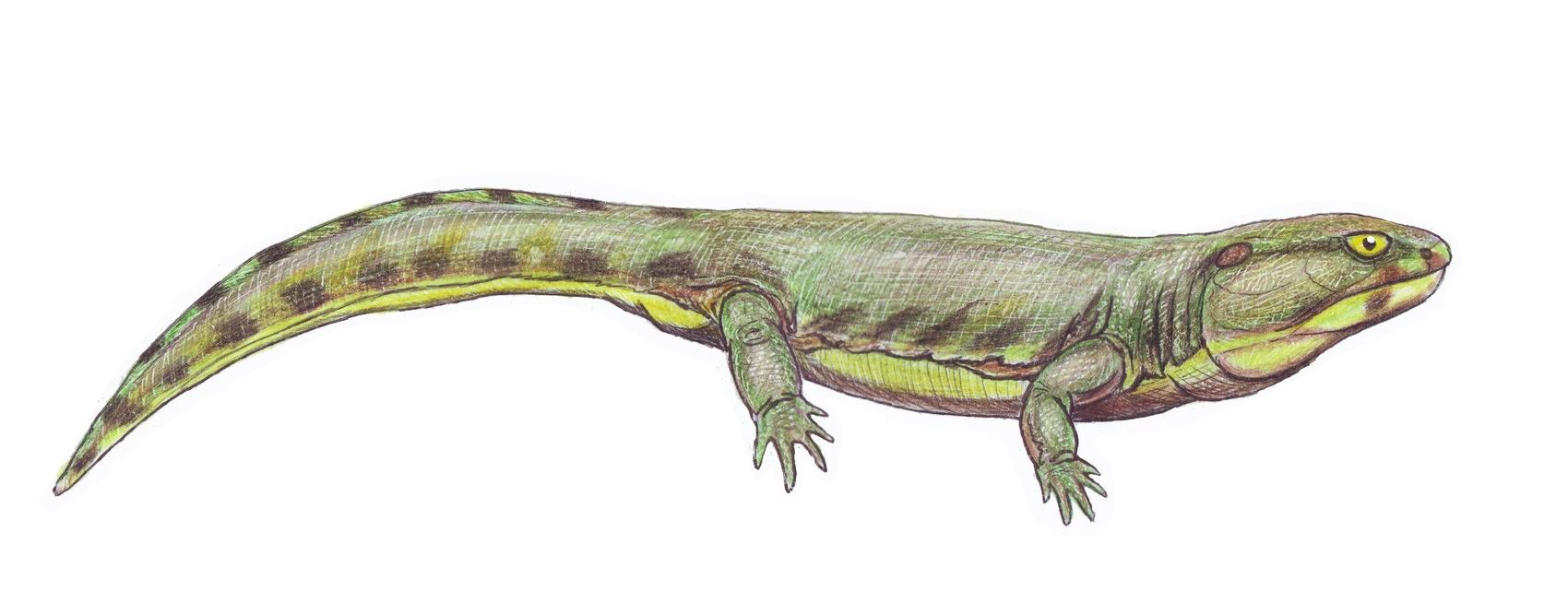
- Restoration of Karpinskiosaurus secundus

Scientific classification
- Domain: Eukaryota
- Kingdom: Animalia
- Phylum: Chordata
- Order: †Seymouriamorpha
- Family: †Karpinskiosauridae; Sushkin, 1925
- Genus: †Karpinskiosaurus; Sushkin, 1925

Species
- †K. secundus (Amalitzky, 1921 [originally Kotlassia secunda]) (type); †K. ultimus (Tchudinov and V'yushkov, 1956 [originally Nycteroleter ultimus])

= Karpinskiosaurus =

Karpinskiosaurus Temporal range: Late Permian 255Ma

Extinct genus of tetrapodomorphs

Karpinskiosaurus is an extinct genus of seymouriamorphs. It includes two species: Karpinskiosaurus secundus and Karpinskiosaurus ultimus. Karpinskiosaurus secundus is represented by two specimens with skull lengths of about 75 mm. All specimens of K. ultimus are smaller than those of K. secundus. Total length of the reptiliomorph was about 50–75 cm.
