= Nikolčice =

- Municipality
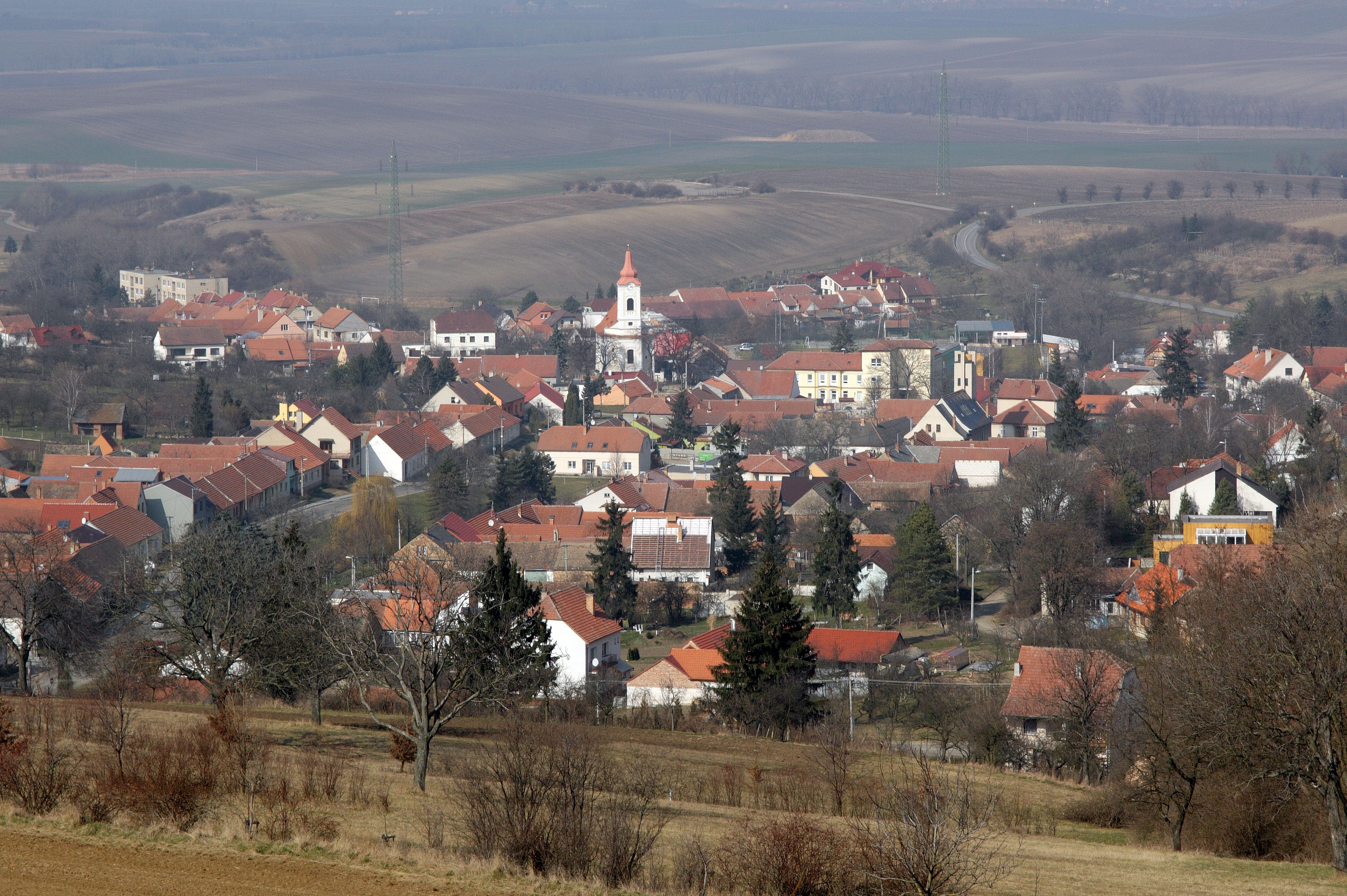
- View from the south

- Flag Coat of arms

- Location in the Czech Republic
- Coordinates: 48°59′36″N 16°45′15″E
- Country: Czech Republic
- Region: South Moravian
- District: Břeclav
- First mentioned: 1046

Area
  - Total: 16.07 km^{2} (6.20 sq mi)
- Elevation: 265 m (869 ft)

Population (2026-01-01)
  - Total: 810
  - Density: 50/km^{2} (130/sq mi)
- Time zone: UTC+1 (CET)
  - Summer (DST): UTC+2 (CEST)
- Postal code: 691 71
- Website: www.nikolcice.cz

Nikolčice is a municipality and village in Břeclav District in the South Moravian Region of the Czech Republic. It has about 800 inhabitants.

Nikolčice lies approximately 30 kilometres (19 mi) north of Břeclav, 24 km (15 mi) south-east of Brno, and 207 km (129 mi) south-east of Prague.

== Demographics ==
Historical population
Year	Pop.	±%
1869	896	—
1880	855	−4.6%
1890	964	+12.7%
1900	1,007	+4.5%
1910	1,052	+4.5%
1921	1,117	+6.2%
1930	1,092	−2.2%
1950	885	−19.0%
1961	882	−0.3%
1970	831	−5.8%
1980	790	−4.9%
1991	707	−10.5%
2001	772	+9.2%
2011	784	+1.6%
2021	760	−3.1%
Source: Censuses

== Notable people ==
- Anton Rzehak (1855–1923), geologist and paleontologist
