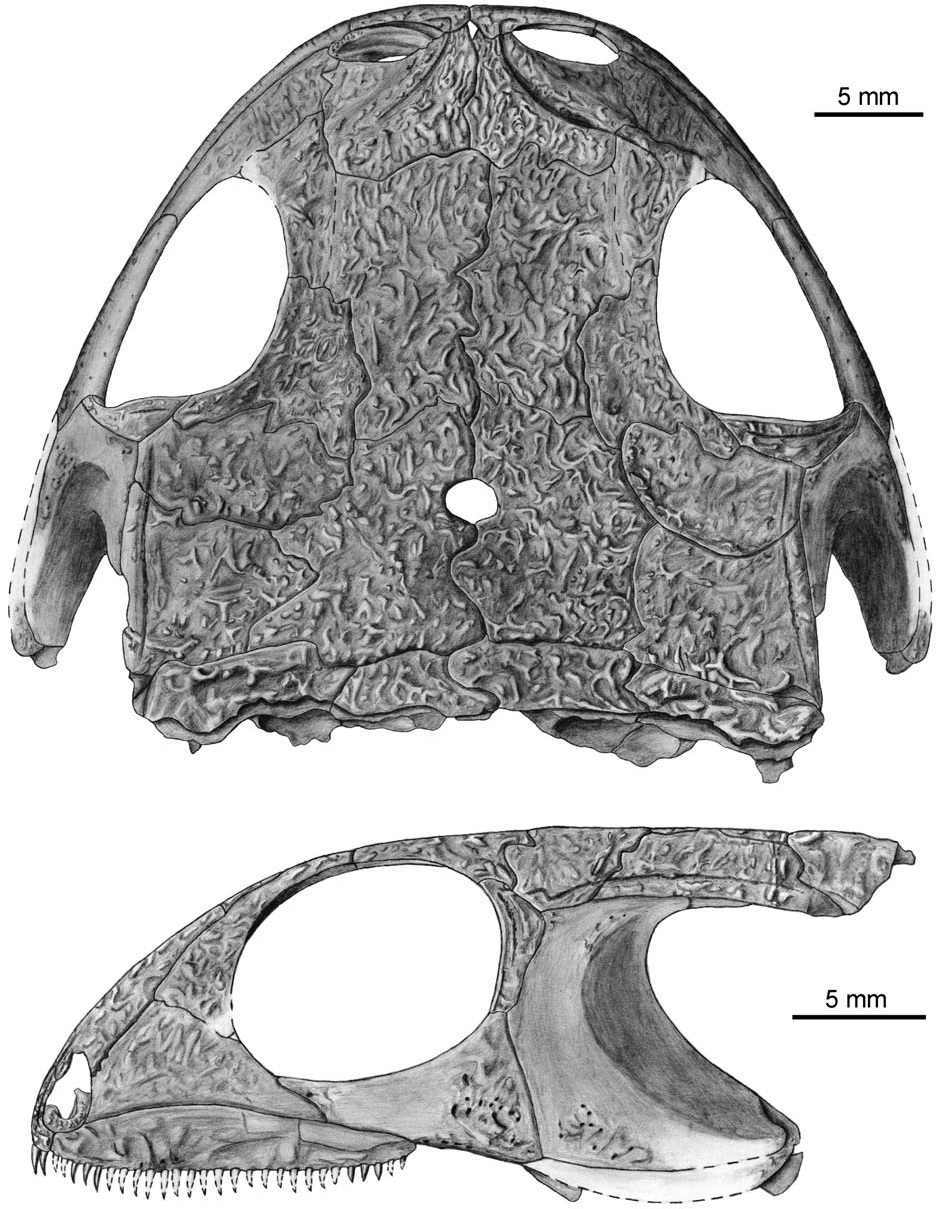
- Skull

Scientific classification
- Domain: Eukaryota
- Kingdom: Animalia
- Phylum: Chordata
- Order: †Seymouriamorpha
- Family: †Discosauriscidae
- Genus: †Makowskia; Klembara, 2005

Species
- M. laticephala Klembara, 2005 (type)

= Makowskia =

Makowskia Temporal range: Cisuralian

Extinct genus of tetrapodomorphs

Makowskia is an extinct genus of discosauriscid seymouriamorph known from the early Permian (lower Saxonian age) of Boskovice Furrow, in the Czech Republic. It was first named by Jozef Klembara in 2005 and the type species is Makowskia laticephala. The generic name honors Alexander Makowsky for describing the first specimens of discosauriscids from the Boskovice Furrow, and the specific name means “broad” (latus in Latin) + “head” (kefalé in Greek). Makowskia is known only from one specimen, the holotype SNMZ 26506, a skull and anterior portion of postcranial skeleton. A phylogenetic analysis places Makowskia as the sister taxon to Spinarerpeton.

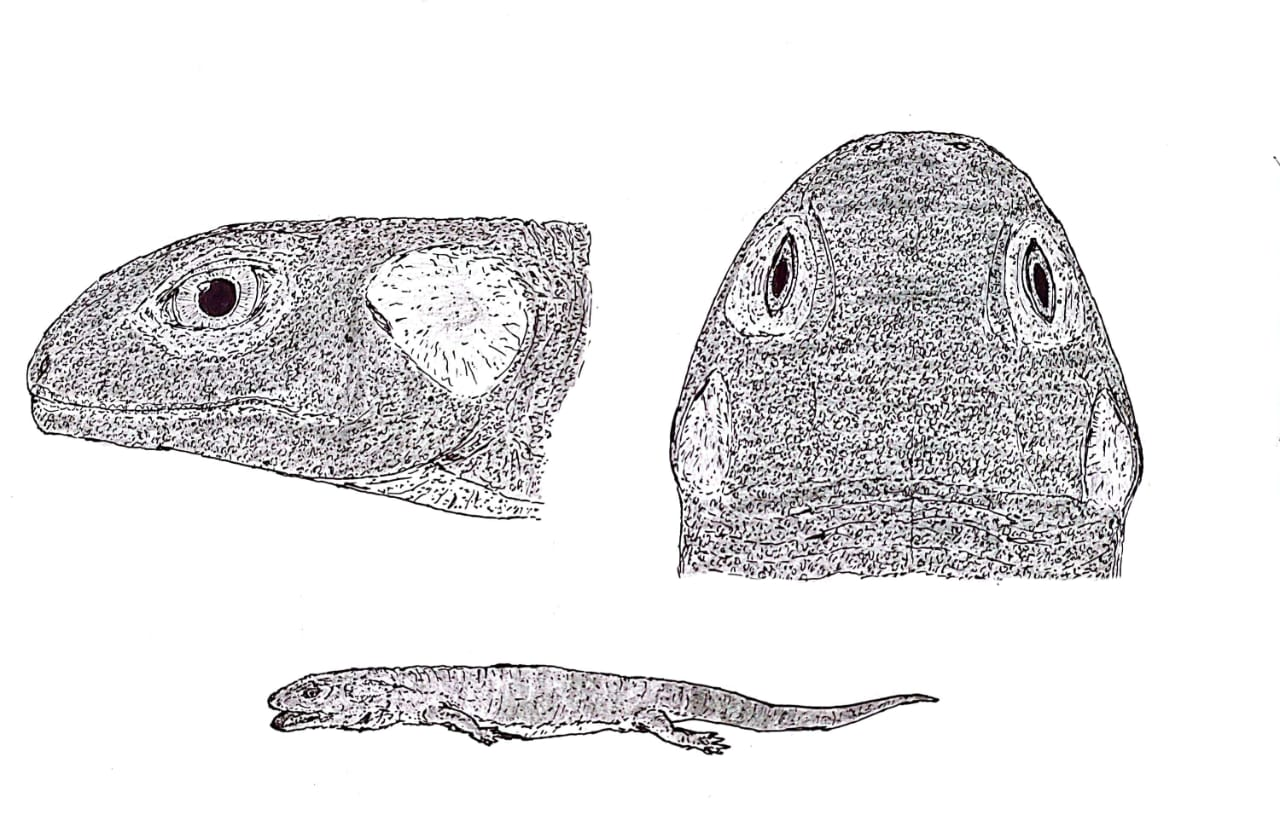
Reconstruction of Makowskia.
