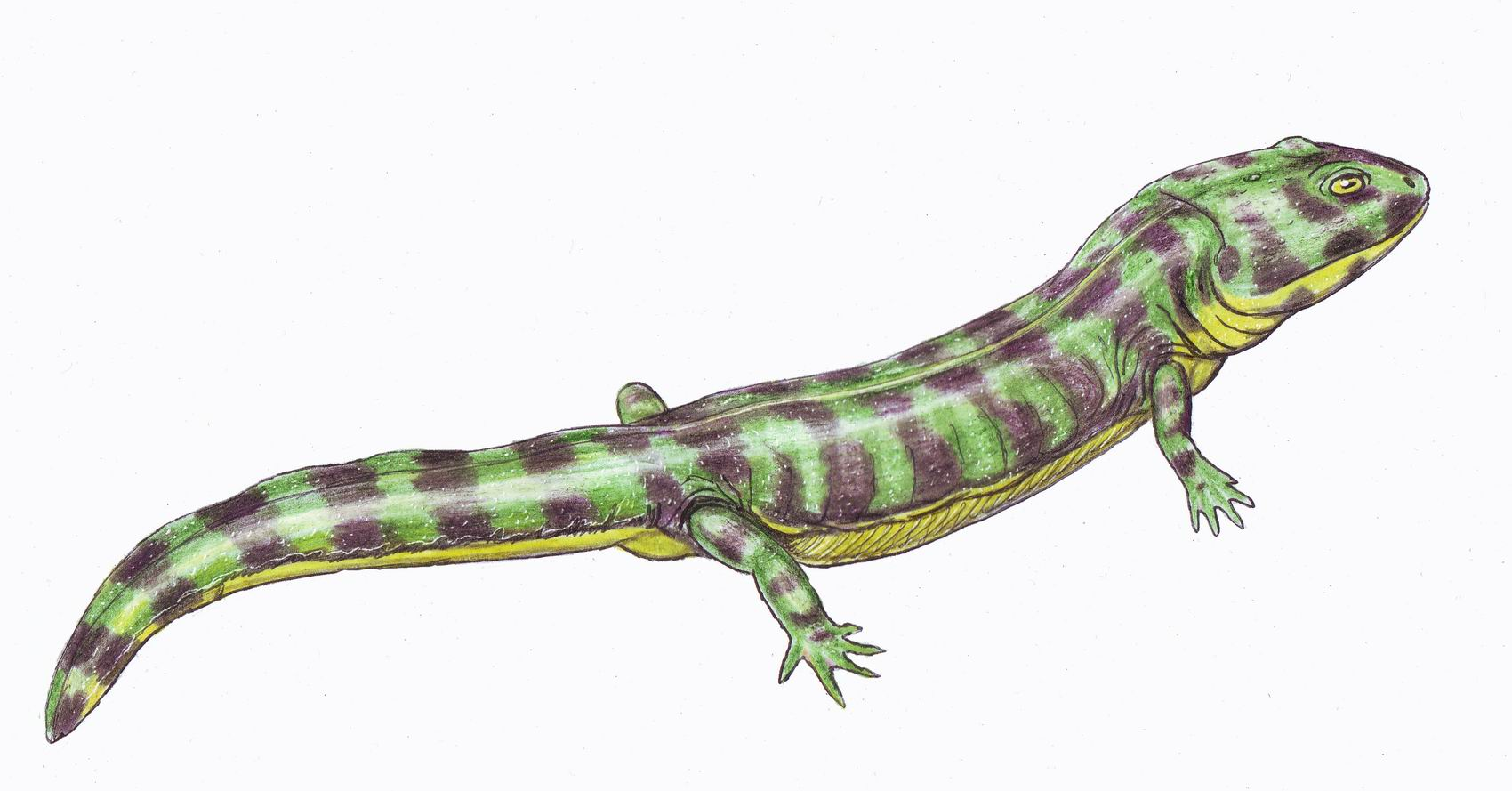

Scientific classification
- Domain: Eukaryota
- Kingdom: Animalia
- Phylum: Chordata
- Order: †Seymouriamorpha
- Suborder: †Leptorophida
- Genus: †Enosuchus

= Enosuchus =

Extinct genus of tetrapodomorphs

Enosuchus is an extinct genus of seymouriamorphs from Russia during the Middle Permian.
