= Anton Rzehak =

Moravian geologist, paleontologist, and prehistorian

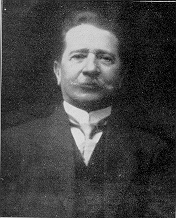
Anton Rzehak

Anton Rzehak (26 May 1855 in Nový Dvůr, part of Nikolčice – 31 March 1923 in Brno) was a Moravian geologist, paleontologist and prehistorian.

He studied chemistry and geology at the University of Technology in Brno, where from 1880 to 1884, he worked as an assistant to Alexander Makowsky (1833–1908). In 1883, the two men published a geological map of the environs of Brno.

From 1884 to 1905 he taught classes in chemistry and natural history at a secondary school in Brno, and meanwhile, obtained an associate professorship for paleontology and applied geography (1902). In 1905, he was named chair of mineralogy and geology at the university of technology in Brno.

The foraminifer genus Rzehakina bears his name.

In Gabon, for example, the Last Apparition Date of the fossil foraminifer Rzehakina epigona marks a point in time very close to the end of the Paleocene epoch, making it a biostratigraphically important species.

== Selected works ==
- Neue entdeckte prähistorische Begräbnissstätten bei Mönitz in Mähren, 1879 – Newly discovered prehistoric burial sites in Mönitz.
- Die pleistocäne Conchylienfauna Mährens, 1888 – The Pleistocene conch fauna of Moravia.
- Über einige merkwürdige Foraminiferen aus dem österreichischen Tertiär, 1895 – On some unusual foraminifera from the Austrian Tertiary.
- Die Tertiärformation in der Umgebung von Nikolsburg in Mähren, 1902 – The Tertiary formation in the environs of Nikolsburg.
- Das Liasvorkommen von Freistadtl in Mähren, 1904 – The Lias occurrence at Freistadtl.
- Beiträge zur Kenntnis der Bronzezeit in Mähren, 1906 – On the Bronze Age in Moravia.
- Zur Kenntnis der neolithischen Keramik Mährens, 1909 – On Neolithic ceramics of Moravia.
- Das Mährische Tertiär, 1922 – The Moravian Tertiary.
