= Spinarerpeton =

Spinarerpeton Temporal range: Early Permian

Scientific classification
- Domain: Eukaryota
- Kingdom: Animalia
- Phylum: Chordata
- Order: †Seymouriamorpha
- Family: †Discosauriscidae
- Genus: †Spinarerpeton; Klembara, 2009

Species
- S. brevicephalum Klembara, 2009 (type)

Extinct genus of tetrapodomorphs

Spinarerpeton is an extinct genus of discosauriscid seymouriamorph known from the early Permian of Boskovice Furrow, in the Czech Republic. It was first named by Jozef Klembara in 2009 and the type species is Spinarerpeton brevicephalum. A phylogenetic analysis places Spinarerpeton as the sister taxon to Makowskia.
