= Amphisauropus =

Amphisauropus Temporal range: Permian-Triassic

Trace fossil classification
- Ichnogenus: Amphisauropus; Haubold 1970

Type ichnospecies
- A. latus Haubold 1970

Ichnospecies
- A. kablikae (Geinitz and Deichmüller 1982); A latus (Haubold 1970; type)

Trace fossil

Amphisauropus is an ichnogenus commonly found in assemblages of trace fossils dating from the Permian to the Triassic. The tracks have been considered to be made by amphibians or by seymouriamorphs. The genus has been found in Europe, Morocco, and North America.

== Description ==
The foot impressions show five digits and clear palm prints, though the fifth digit is not always impressed. The digits are short and broad with rounded tips. The pes (rear foot) is longer than wide while the manus (front foot) is wider than long. A continuous tail impression is also present. The animal may have had a trunk length of about 12 centimeters (4.7 in) and likely moved quite slowly.
