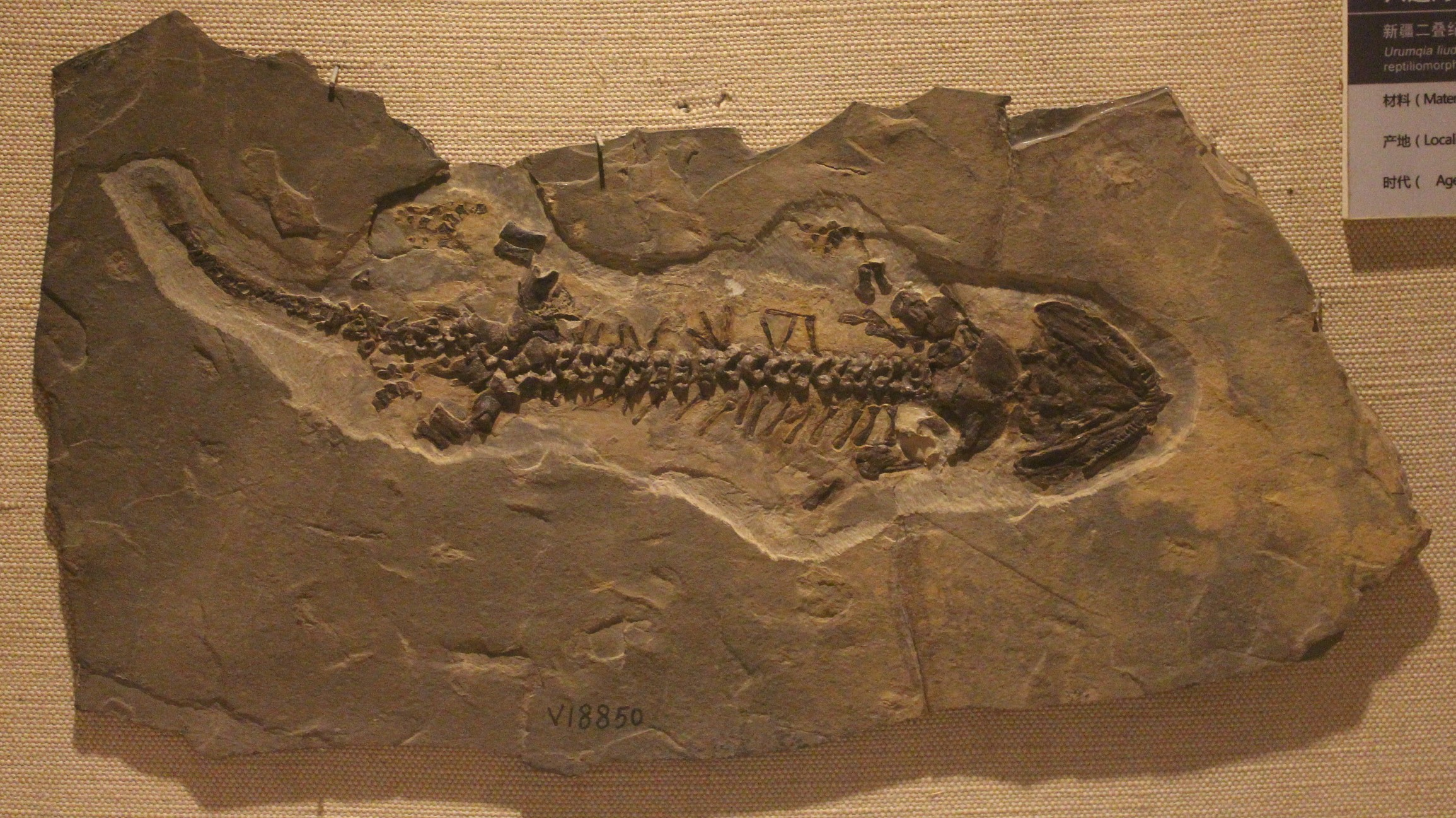
- Fossil, Paleozoological Museum of China

Scientific classification
- Domain: Eukaryota
- Kingdom: Animalia
- Phylum: Chordata
- Order: †Seymouriamorpha
- Family: †Utegeniidae
- Genus: †Utegenia; Kuznetsov & Ivakhnenko, 1981
- Species: †U. shpinari

Binomial name
- †Utegenia shpinari Kuznetsov & Ivakhnenko, 1981

Synonyms
- Urumqia Zhang, Li & Wang, 1984

= Utegenia =

Utegenia Temporal range: Permian

Extinct genus of tetrapodomorphs

Utegenia is a genus of early tetrapod. It is usually regarded as a basal seymouriamorph, but sometimes included in the Discosauriscidae or as a sister taxon of the latter. Only one species, Utegenia shpinari, found from Kazakhstan, is known. Urumqia, another basal seymouriamorph, from Ürümqi, Xinjiang of China is probably a junior synonym of Utegenia.
