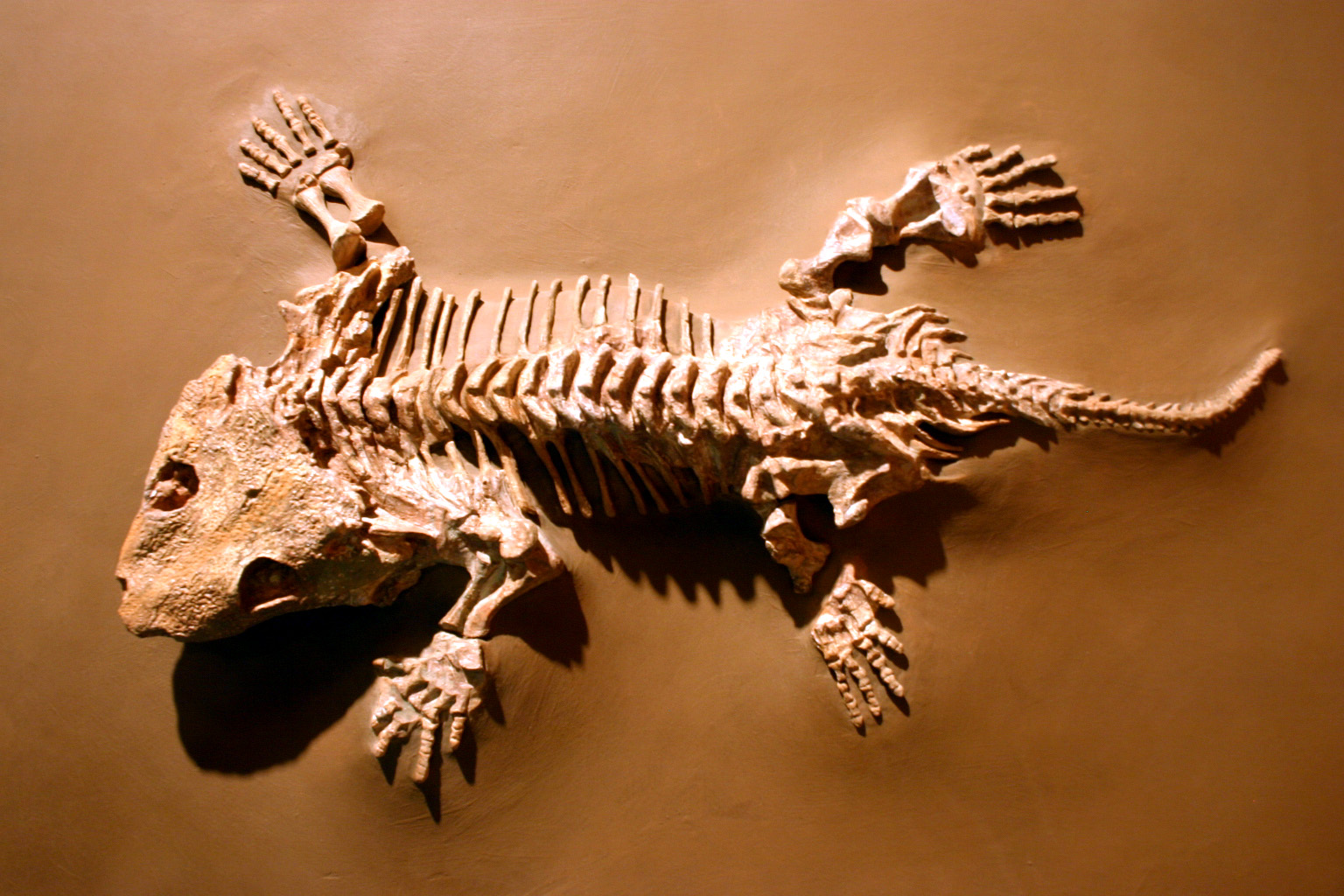
- Fossil of Seymouria in the National Museum of Natural History

Scientific classification
- Kingdom: Animalia
- Phylum: Chordata
- Clade: Reptiliomorpha (?)
- Order: †Seymouriamorpha; Watson, 1917

Subgroups
- See text.

= Seymouriamorpha =

Seymouriamorpha Temporal range: Late Carboniferous - Late Permian

Extinct order of tetrapodomorphs

Seymouriamorpha are an extinct group of tetrapods (terrestrial vertebrates) known from the Carboniferous and Permian periods. They have long been considered stem-amniotes (reptiliomorphs), and most paleontologists still accept this point of view, but some analyses suggest that seymouriamorphs are stem-tetrapods (not more closely related to Amniota than to Lissamphibia). Seymouriamorphs are divided into three main groups: Kotlassiidae, Discosauriscidae, and Seymouriidae, which includes the best-known genus, Seymouria. The last seymouriamorphs became extinct by the end of the Permian.

Many seymouriamorphs were terrestrial or semi-aquatic. However, aquatic larvae bearing external gills and grooves from the lateral line belonging to the seymouriamorph family Discosauriscidae have been found, making seymouriamorphs unquestionably non-amniotes. As they matured, they became more terrestrial and reptile-like. They ranged from 30 cm (1 ft) long lizard-sized creatures to the 1.5 m (5 ft) long Enosuchus. If seymouriamorphs are reptiliomorphs, they were the distant relatives of amniotes.

They have been considered to be the makers of the trace fossils placed in the ichnogenus Amphisauropus.

== Taxonomy ==
- Biarmica
- Enosuchus
- Kotlassia
- Leptoropha
- Microphon
- Nyctiboetus
- Utegenia
- Waggoneria
- Family Karpinskiosauridae
  - Karpinskiosaurus
- Family Discosauriscidae
  - Ariekanerpeton
  - Discosauriscus
  - Makowskia
  - Spinarerpeton
- Family Seymouriidae
  - Seymouria

Cladogram based on Ruta, Jeffery, & Coates (2003):

- Seymouriamorpha
  - Kotlassia
  - - Utegenia
    - - - Seymouria baylorensis
        - Seymouria sanjuanensis
      - - Ariekanerpeton
        - - Discosauriscus austriacus
          - Discosauriscus pulcherrimus

Cladogram based on Klembara (2009) & Klembara (2010):

- Seymouriamorpha
  - Utegenia
  - - Seymouria
    - - Karpinskiosaurus
      - Discosauriscidae
        - - Makowskia
          - Spinarerpeton
        - - Ariekanerpeton
          - Discosauriscus

== Gallery ==
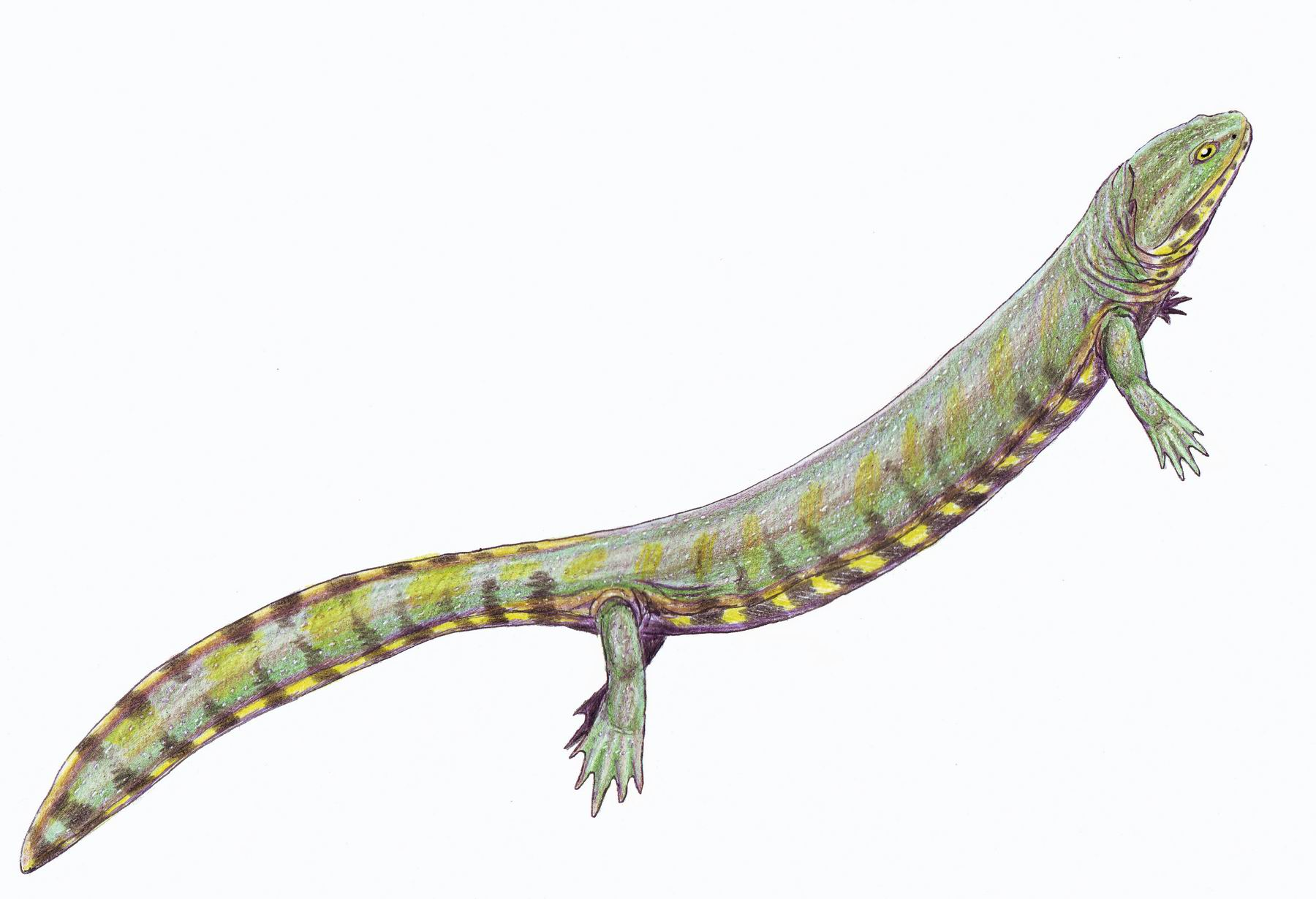
Kotlassia

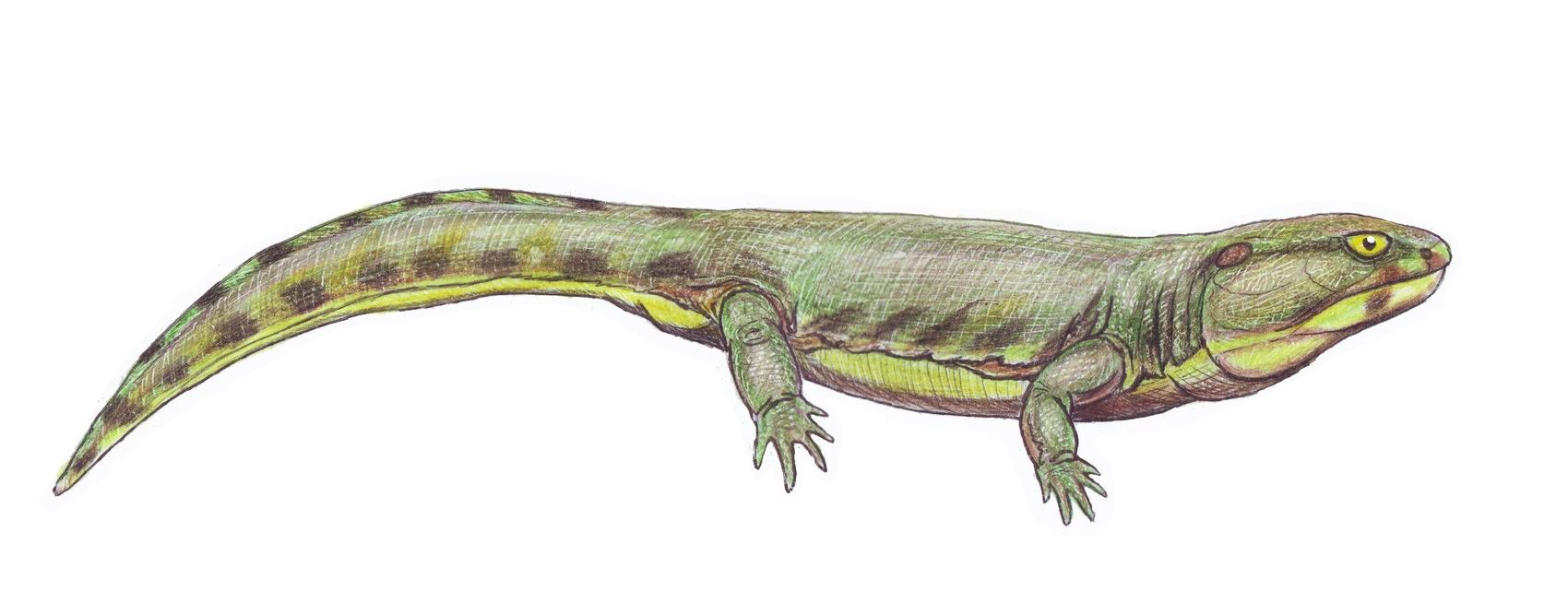
Karpinskiosaurus
