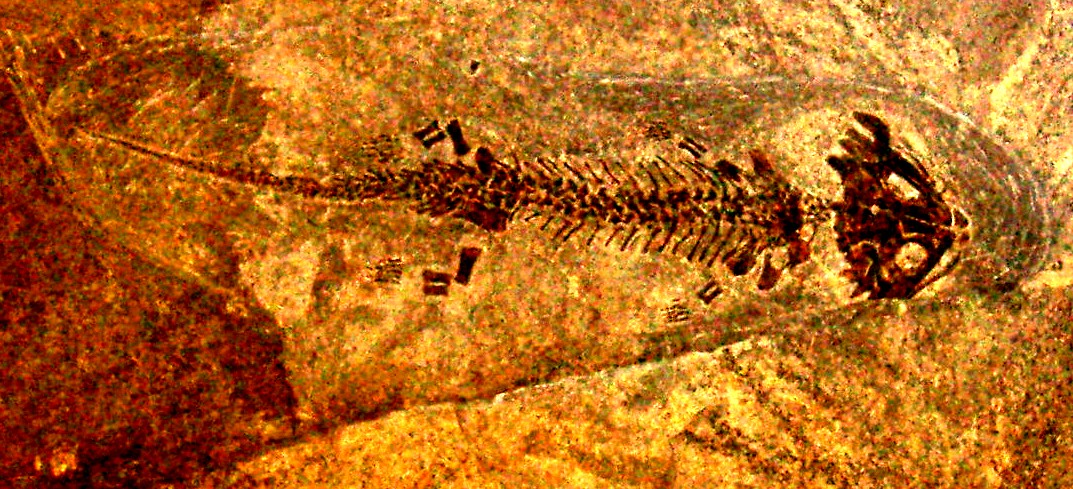
- Discosauriscus austriacus

Scientific classification
- Kingdom: Animalia
- Phylum: Chordata
- Order: †Seymouriamorpha
- Family: †Discosauriscidae
- Genus: †Discosauriscus; Kuhn, 1933

Species
- Discosauriscus austriacus (Makowsky, 1876); Discosauriscus pulcherrimus (Fritsch, 1879) (type)

Synonyms
- Letoverpeton Spinar, 1952

= Discosauriscus =

Discosauriscus Temporal range: Gzhelian–Cisuralian

Extinct genus of reptile-like amphibians

Discosauriscus was a small seymouriamorph which lived in what is now Central and Western Europe during the latest Carboniferous and in the Early Permian Period. Its best fossils have been found in the Broumov and Bačov Formations of Boskovice Furrow, in the Czech Republic.

== Classification ==
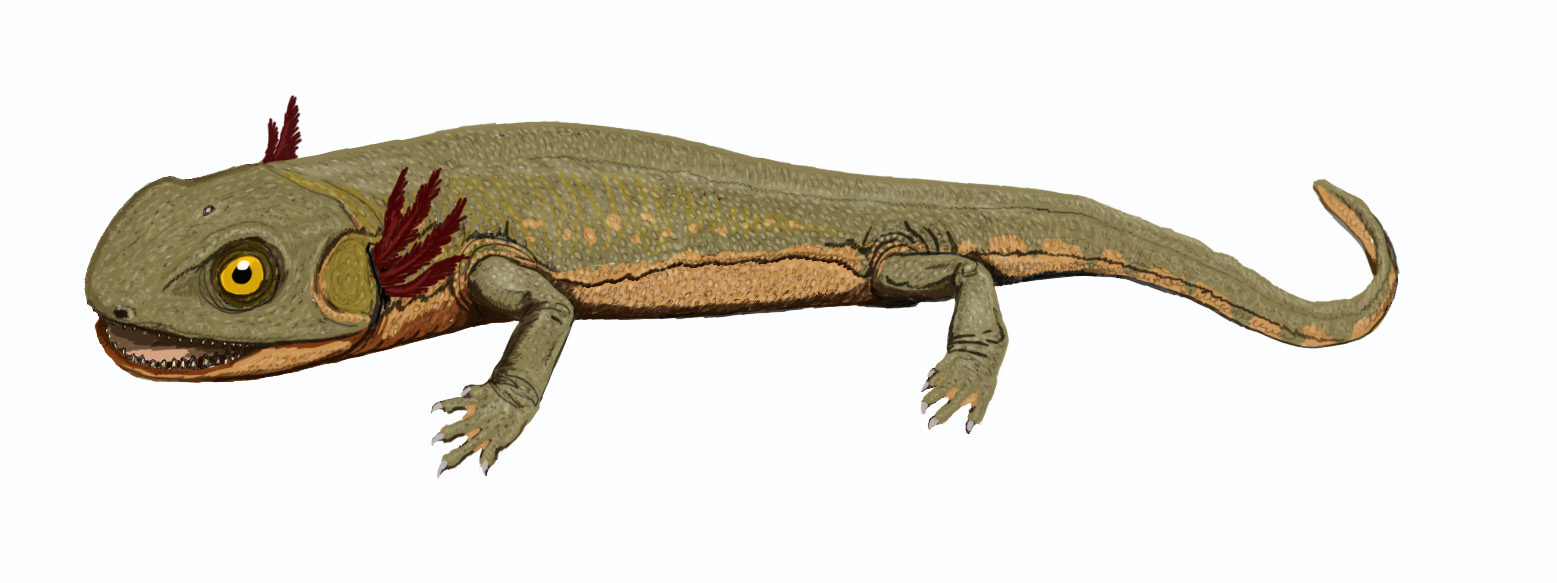
A reconstruction of a juvenile Discosauriscus with external gills

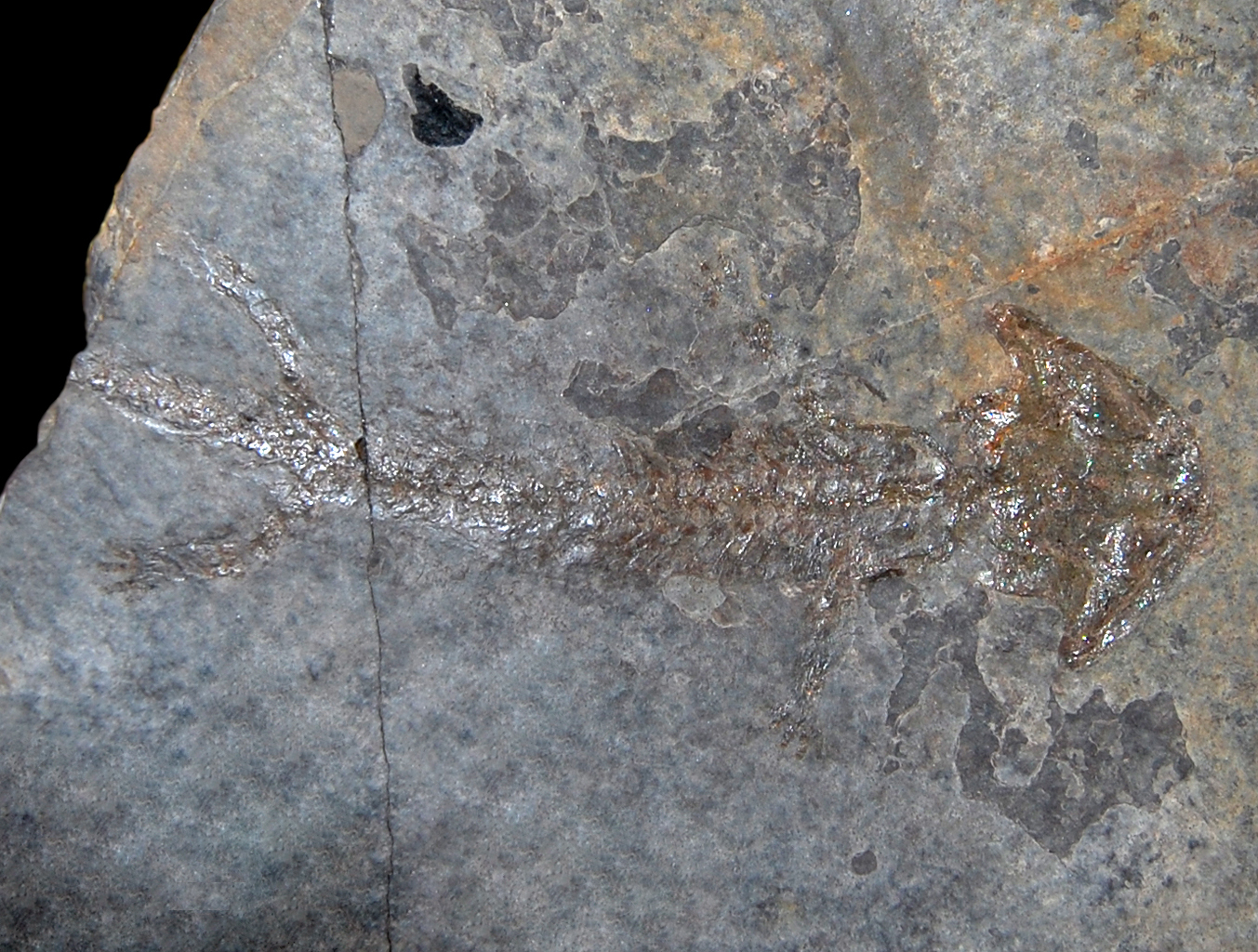
Fossil in Vienna

Discosauriscus belongs to the order Seymouriamorpha, and is the type genus of the family Discosauriscidae. Currently recognised are two valid species – Discosauriscus austriacus and Discosauriscus pulcherrimus. Letoverpeton is a junior synonym of Discosauriscus.

== Characteristics ==
Discosauriscids were long thought to be known from larval or neotenic forms, and three ontogenetic stages had been distinguished. However, more recent studies concluded that some subadult, probably terrestrial specimens were known, so the case for neoteny in this taxon is not as well-supported as once thought. Discosauriscus had wide jaws with sharp teeth, short limbs and relatively long tail. The phalangeal formula was 2–3–4–5–3 for both hind- and forelimbs. The body was covered with rounded scales with concentric rings, and a well-preserved lateral-line system has been described.

Discosauriscus may have had electroreceptive organs.
