= List of reptiliomorphs =

A list of reptiliomorphs, (excluding amniotes), throughout their time.

== A ==
- Anthracosaurus
- Archeria
- Ariekanerpeton

== B ==
- Bystrowiana

== C ==
- Chroniosaurus
- Chroniosuchus
- Cricotus

== D ==
- Diadectes
- Diasparactus
- Diplovertebron
- Discosauriscus

== E ==
- Enosuchus
- Eogyrinus

== G ==
- Gefyrostegus

== K ==
- Karpinskiosaurus
- Kotlassia

== L ==
- Lanthanosuchus
- Leptoropha
- Limnoscelis

== M ==
- Macroleter

== N ==
- Neopteroplax

== O ==
- Orobates

== P ==
- Pholiderpeton
- Proterogyrinus
- Pteroplax

== R ==
- Rhinosauriscus

== S ==
- Seymouria
- Solenodonsaurus

== T ==
- Tokosaurus
- Tseajaia
- Tulerpeton

== U ==
- Uralerpeton
- Utegenia

== W ==
- Westlothiana
