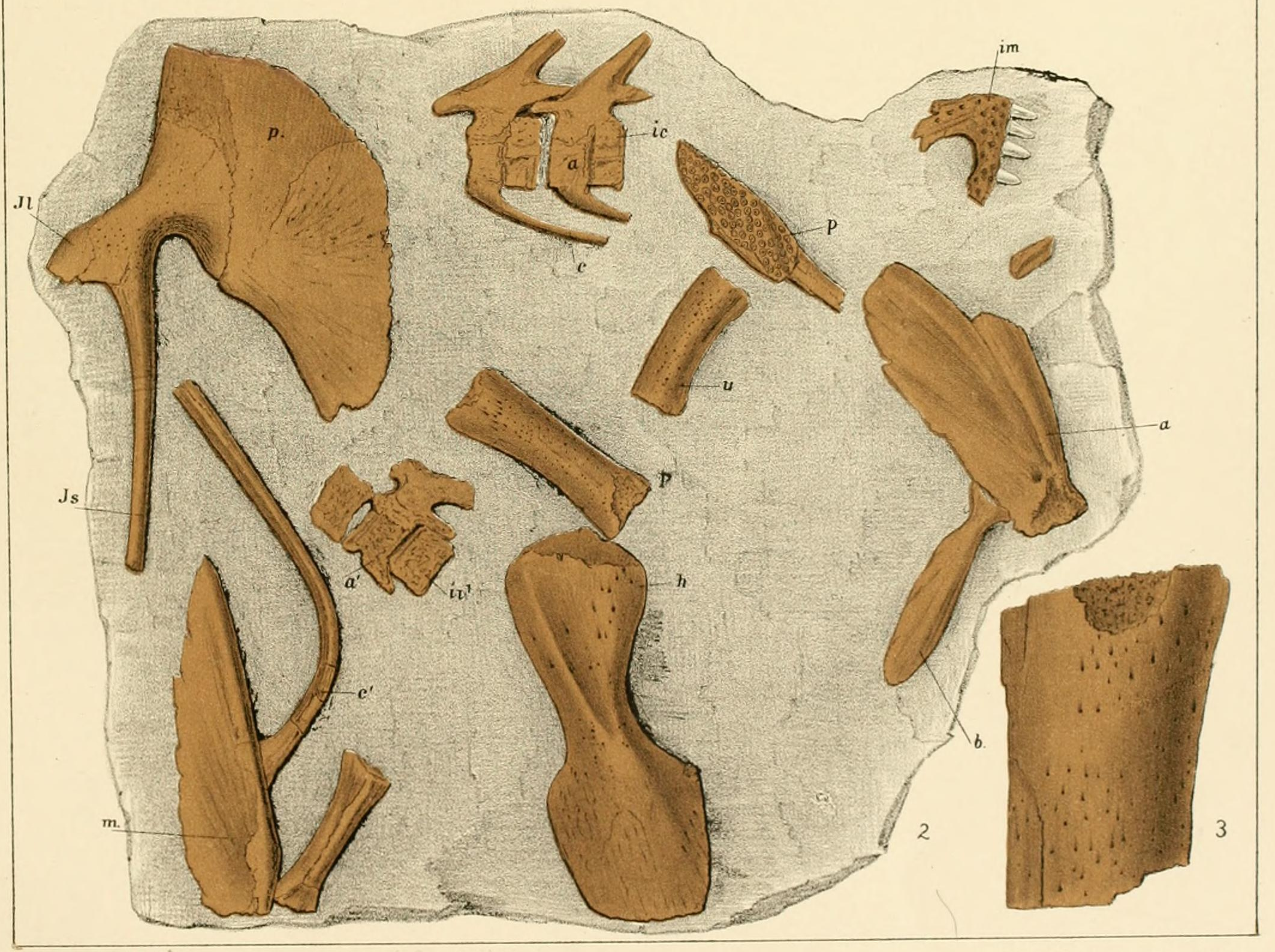
- Frič's illustration of the smaller slab containing Diplovertebron fossils.

Scientific classification
- Kingdom: Animalia
- Phylum: Chordata
- Order: †Embolomeri
- Family: †Eogyrinidae
- Genus: †Diplovertebron; Frič, 1879

Type species
- Diplovertebron punctatum Frič, 1879

Synonyms
- Diplospondylus Lydekker, 1889; Nummulosaurus kolbii? Frič, 1901

= Diplovertebron =

Diplovertebron Temporal range: Late Carboniferous, Moscovian

Extinct genus of tetrapodomorphs

Diplovertebron (from Greek: διπλοῦς diplóos, 'double' and Latin: vertebron, 'vertebra') is an extinct genus of embolomere that lived in the Late Carboniferous period (Moscovian), about 310 million years ago. Diplovertebron was a medium-sized animal, around 50 cm in length. Members of the genus inhabited European Carboniferous swamps in what is now the Czech Republic. They were closely related to larger swamp-dwelling tetrapods like Proterogyrinus and Anthracosaurus. However, Diplovertebron were much smaller than these large, crocodile-like creatures. Known from a single species, Diplovertebron punctatum, this genus has had a complicated history closely tied to Gephyrostegus, another genus of small, reptile-like amphibians.

== History ==
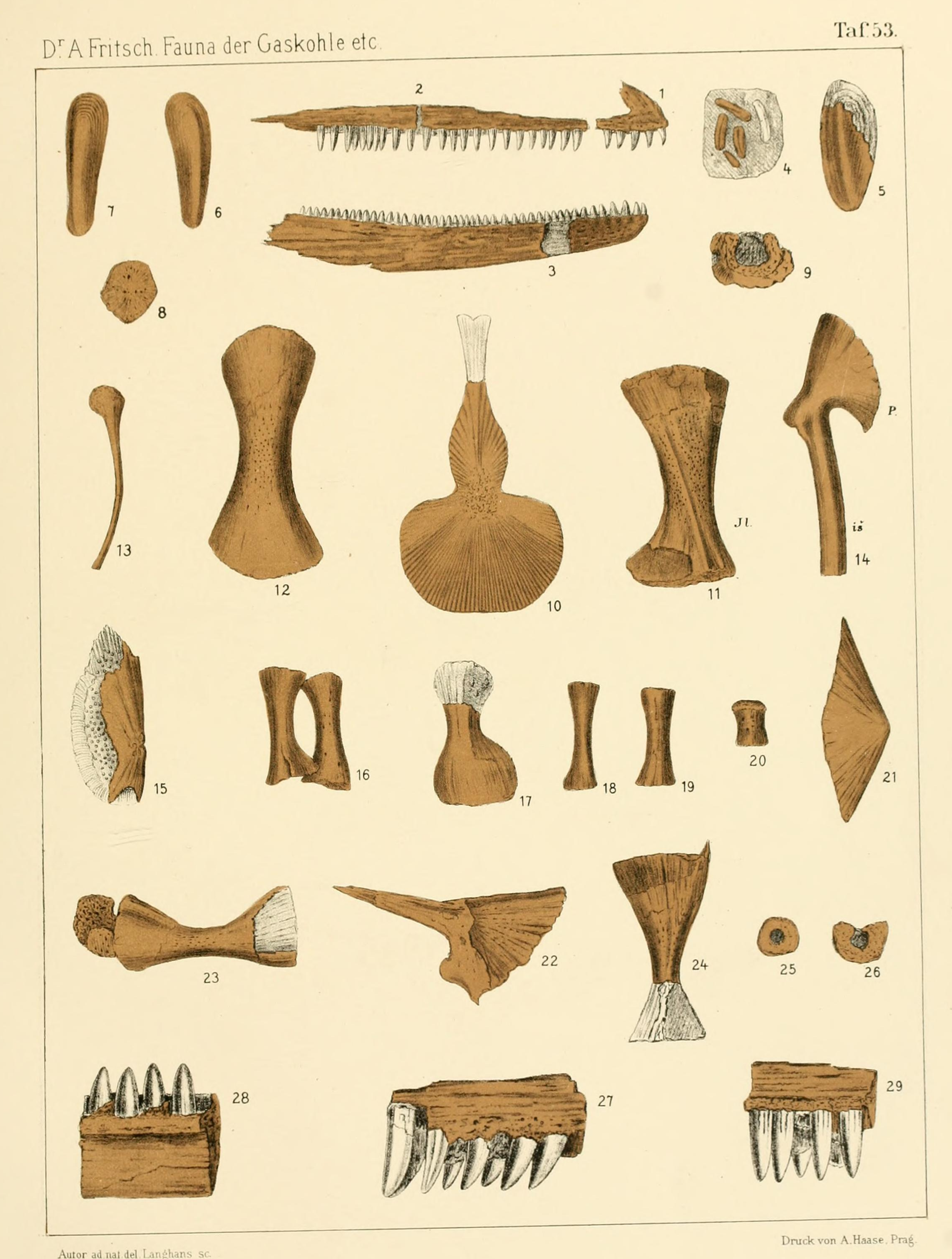
Plate 53, Frič's illustration containing fossils from the larger slab

Diplovertebron was one of many tetrapods found in Czech coal swamps by Antonin Frič in the late 19th century. Its remains were an assortment of disarticulated fossils encased in two slabs of coal, which were designated Fr. Orig. 96 (for the smaller slab) and Fr. Orig. 128 (for the larger slab). D.M.S. Watson (1926) assigned two more complete specimens to the genus. One of these had already been named as the type specimen of the reptile-like tetrapod Gephyrostegus by Otto Jaekel in 1902, while the second specimen, DMSW B.65, was newly described. A later study, Brough & Brough (1967), restored the validity of Gephyrostegus and rebuked Watson's decision to add Jaekel's and his specimens to Diplovertebron. Richard Lydekker renamed Diplovertebron to Diplospondylus in 1889, based on the fact that the etymology of "Diplospondylus" was all Greek, while that of "Diplovertebron" was a hybrid of Greek and Latin. However, few other paleontologists shared Lydekker's aversion to hybrid names.

Another aspect of Diplovertebron's history which led to some confusion relates to the labeling in Frič's original lithographic illustrations. Plate 53, the illustration which featured remains from the larger slab of Diplovertebron fossils (Fr. Orig. 128), was accidentally labeled as pertaining to fossils from the smaller slab (Fr. Orig 96). As a result, many paleontologists misunderstood the original description and ignored the larger slab when describing Diplovertebron, as they assumed that there was only a single slab (Fr. Orig. 96) available. There were only a few exceptions to this mistake, namely Steen (1938) and Klembara et al. (2014).

Several Czech fossils described by Frič as other genera may actually represent additional Diplovertebron material. Hemichthys problematica, a supposed fish skull described in 1895, was later found to be an anthracosaur skull. Klembara et al. (2014: 776) argued that the Hemichthys skull fossil was actually referable to Gephyrostegus, and that, although the name Hemichthys was published earlier, it had not been considered a valid taxon since its original description, so it should be treated as a nomen oblitum according to ICZN Art. 23.9.1. They treated Diplovertebron as a valid genus, different from Gephyrostegus. Likewise, an embolomerous tail with dense scalation along its underside was named Nummulosaurus kolbii in 1901. Romer (1947) could find no evidence that Nummulosaurus was not identical to Diplovertebron. Romer was also one of the few paleontologists to consider Diplovertebron to be a seymouriamorph, rather than an embolomere. However, this classification scheme was based on Gephyrostegus fossils, as the two genera were still considered synonymous in 1947.

== Description ==
Historical recounts of Diplovertebron between 1926 and 1967 typically reconstructed it as a reptile-like terrestrial animal with five-fingered hands and feet. However, these reconstructions were created using more complete skeletal remains of Gephyrostegus and Solenodonsaurus, which at the time were considered to be synonymous with Diplovertebron. Without these skeletons, the fossil remains of Diplovertebron are much more limited. Nowadays it is assumed that Diplovertebron was partially or fully aquatic, akin to other embolomeres like Archeria and Proterogyrinus. Nevertheless, it was probably still similar to Gephyrostegus in terms of general proportions.

Like other embolomeres, each of Diplovertebron's vertebrae were composed of two ring-shaped components of equal size. Frič originally regarded this as a unique feature, but as early as 1884, E.D. Cope drew connections between the vertebrae of Diplovertebron and "Cricotus" (an American embolomere more commonly known as Archeria). The preserved vertebrae were from the tail region, since the front segment (intercentrum) connected to thin haemal arches.

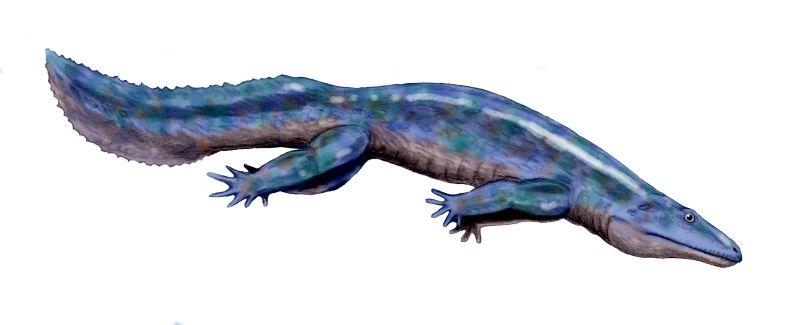
Life restoration of Diplovertebron

The fragmentary skull bones are only slightly ornamented with striations, rather than the numerous pits that were present in its relatives. The premaxilla contained five thick and conical teeth, about twice as long as they were wide. The maxilla likely had over 30 teeth in it, and its teeth were thinner than those of the premaxilla. The teeth towards the front of the maxilla were thicker and more widely separated, while those at the back were closely packed. The teeth of the lower jaw were more numerous, closely packed, and much smaller than those of the upper jaw. There were over 40 in total, and the first 7 were the largest and most well-spaced. All of the teeth possessed maze-like enamel folding similar to other "labyrinthodonts". These dental features showed some similarities to the teeth of Calligenethlon, an embolomere which was similar in size to Diplovertebron.

The belly was covered with long, oblong scales with rounded edges, while the back was bare. Various limb bones were preserved. Unusually, they were covered with tiny pores. The humerus had a strong diagonal ridge along half of its shaft, similar to that of Archeria. The pelvis was also quite similar to that of Archeria and Calligenethlon in the fact that the ilium had a structure typical for embolomeres: two rod-like prongs atop a short "stem". The front prong was short, but the rear prong was very long Frič (1885) referred an interclavicle to Diplovertebron, though it may have actually been from Gephyrostegus instead.

== In popular culture ==
The title creature in the 1959 horror film The Monster of Piedras Blancas is described as a diplovertebron, though considerable liberties are taken in its physical appearance.
