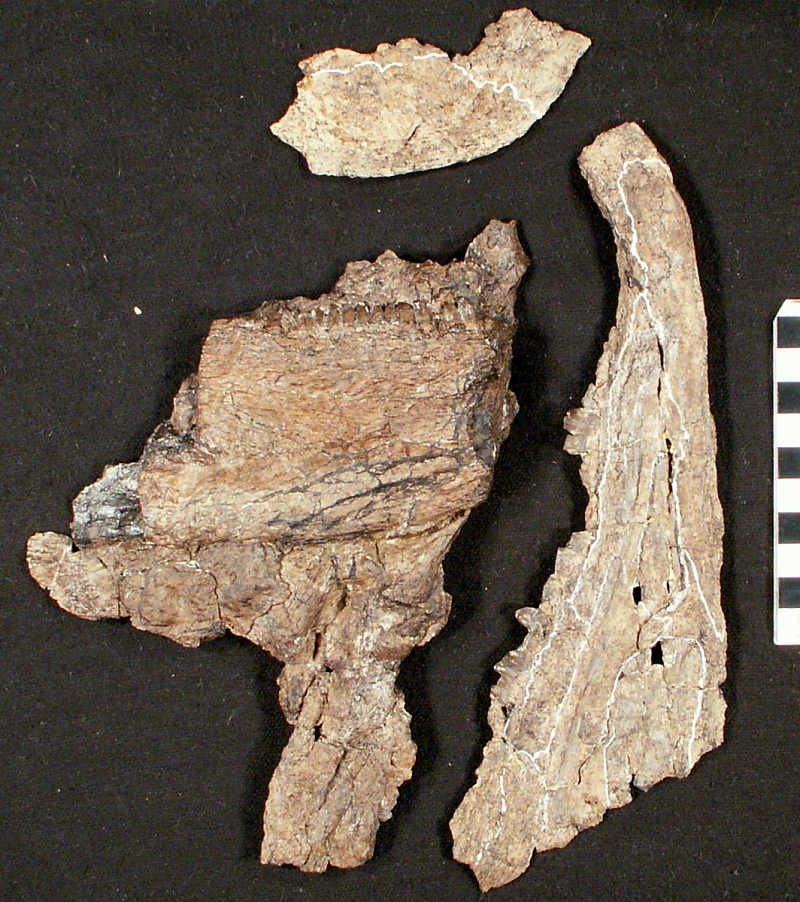
- Skull fragments from the holotype specimen, USNM V 6699

Scientific classification
- Kingdom: Animalia
- Phylum: Chordata
- Order: †Embolomeri
- Genus: †Eobaphetes; Moodie, 1916

Type species
- Erpetosuchus kansensis Moodie, 1911

= Eobaphetes =

Eobaphetes Temporal range: Late Pennsylvanian, Westphalian D to Stephanian

Extinct genus of amphibians

Eobaphetes is an extinct genus of embolomere which lived in North America, probably from the Pennsylvanian (late Carboniferous) of Kansas. The genus is based on several skull and jaw fragments of a single individual. They were originally described under the species Erpetosuchus kansasensis, but this was later changed to Eobaphetes kansasensis when it was determined that Erpetosuchus was preoccupied by a Triassic reptile.

== Origin ==
The provenance of Eobaphetes is uncertain. According to a label which was later lost, its specimens were supposedly found in a coal seam in Washington County, Kansas by fossil collector Gustav Hambach. However, coal deposits are unknown in this county. Plant fossils from Washington County, Kansas are of Early Permian age, which may suggest that Eobaphetes came from an unrecorded Early Permian coal seam. Hambach's collections were acquired by the National Museum of Natural History around 1908-1909, and University of Kansas paleontologist Roy Lee Moodie described the fossils as Erpetosuchus kansasensis in 1911. Five years later, he revised the name to Eobaphetes kansasensis, since Erpetosuchus was a name already preoccupied by a reptile from Triassic Scotland, named by E.T. Newton in 1894.

In 1963, A.S. Romer suggested that Hambach actually collected the specimens from Washington County, Arkansas. Early Pennsylvanian coal deposits (the Namurian or Westphalian A Baldwin coal of the Bloyd Formation) have been found in that county. As a result, Eobaphetes may be one of the oldest embolomeres (if from Arkansas) or one of the youngest (if from Kansas). Hambach worked in both Kansas and Arkansas during his career.

Chemical and spore analysis of the specimens' coal matrix finds little similarity to the Baldwin coal. Instead, it appears to be far more similar to the Nodaway coal of the Howard Limestone Formation. Spores indicate that this formation was deposited later in the Pennsylvanian, Westphalian D or Stephanian. The Howard Limestone is found in Missouri, Iowa, and Kansas. This suggests that Eobaphetes did come from Kansas, though not necessarily Washington County.

== Classification ==
Eobaphetes has often been compared to Anthracosaurus, and at one point was even synonymized with it. However, most authors consider it an eogyrinid like the majority of embolomeres. More specifically, it has been classified as a member of Leptophractinae, a subfamily of North American eogyrinids characterized by their circular orbits. Other leptophractines include Neopteroplax and Leptophractus. Phylogenetic analyses suggest its closest relatives are Carbonoherpeton, "Pholiderpeton" (Eogyrinus) attheyi, and Calligenethlon.
