= Scottish Coal Measures Group =

Coal-bearing rock strata in Scotland

- Stratigraphic range: Langsettian (Westphalian A) – Bolsovian (Westphalian C)
- Type: Group
- Unit of: Coal Measures Group
- Sub-units: Scottish Upper Coal Measures Formation, Scottish Middle Coal Measures Formation, Scottish Lower Coal Measures Formation
- Underlies: Mauchline Volcanic Formation
- Overlies: Passage Formation (Clackmannan Group)
- Thickness: up to 940 m

Lithology
- Primary: mudstone, sandstone
- Other: siltstone, coal, seatearth

Location
- Region: Scotland
- Extent: Midland Valley

The Scottish Coal Measures Group is a lithostratigraphic unit referring to the coal-bearing succession of rock strata which occur in Scotland during the Westphalian regional stage of the Carboniferous Period. It is the Scottish portion of the informal Coal Measures Group, which also includes the South Wales and Pennine coal measures. The Scottish coal measures are well-exposed across the Midland Valley. The group is also found within small grabens in the vicinity of Sanquhar and Thornhill.

== Stratigraphy ==
From youngest to oldest, the Scottish Coal Measures Group comprises the:

- Scottish Upper Coal Measures Formation (Bolsovian / Westphalian C)
- Scottish Middle Coal Measures Formation (Duckmantian / Westphalian B)
- Scottish Lower Coal Measures Formation (Langsettian / Westphalian A)

== Paleobiota ==
The Scottish coal measures represent a lush coal swamp ecosystem populated by large amphibious tetrapods (amphibians, in the broad sense). Amphibians known from the group include embolomeres (Anthracosaurus, Palaeoherpeton, Pholiderpeton [formerly Eogyrinus]) and baphetids (Baphetes, Loxomma, Megalocephalus).

Typical Westphalian-age marine fossils and plant impressions are abundant in some coal beds. Insect fossils are rarer in Scottish coal relative to England or Wales. Only five insect genera are known from the Scottish coal measures: Truemania (a dragonfly-like meganisopteran), Lithomantis and Idoptilus (palaeodictyopterans), and Archimylacris and Lithomylacris (roachoids).
