= Papposaurus =

Papposaurus Temporal range: Late Mississippian, Namurian A (Serpukhovian)

Scientific classification
- Domain: Eukaryota
- Kingdom: Animalia
- Phylum: Chordata
- Clade: Sarcopterygii
- Clade: Tetrapodomorpha
- Order: †Embolomeri
- Family: †Proterogyrinidae
- Genus: †Papposaurus; Watson, 1914

Type species
- Papposaurus traquairi Watson, 1914

Extinct genus of tetrapodomorphs

Papposaurus is an extinct genus of proterogyrinid embolomere which lived in the Mississippian (early Carboniferous) of Scotland. It is known from a single species, Papposaurus traquiairi, which is based on an isolated femur discovered in ironstone near Loanhead. Though originally compared closely to reptiles, subsequent study has revealed closer similarity to basal embolomeres such as Proterogyrinus and Archeria. With such limited remains, Papposaurus may not be a valid genus. The femur was redescribed in 1986 by T. R. Smithson, who considered Papposaurus traquairi a nomen vanum possibly synonymous with Proterogyrinus scheelei.
