= Spondylerpeton =

Spondylerpeton Temporal range: Late Carboniferous, 309–307 Ma

Scientific classification
- Kingdom: Animalia
- Phylum: Chordata
- Clade: Sarcopterygii
- Clade: Tetrapodomorpha
- Order: †Embolomeri
- Family: †Archeriidae
- Genus: †Spondylerpeton; Moodie, 1912

Type species
- †Spondylerpeton spinatum Moodie, 1912

Extinct genus of tetrapodomorphs

Spondylerpeton is an extinct genus of embolomere closely related to "Cricotus" (Archeria) in the family Archeriidae. This genus is known from fragmentary remains, namely a short series of tail vertebrae preserved in an ironstone nodule. These remains were found in the Mazon Creek beds of Illinois, an area famed for its preservation of Carboniferous plants and animals. Spondylerpeton individuals were probably about three to four feet in length, by far the largest animals known to have inhabited the Mazon Creek area during this era.

They are actively found in terrestrial environment, in freshwater and are actively mobile
