= Palaeogyrinus =

Palaeogyrinus may refer to:

- Palaeogyrinus Schlechtendal, 1894, a beetle. Now treated as part of Laccophilus
- Palaeogyrinus Watson, 1926, an extinct embolomere amphibian. A junior homonym of the above, later renamed Palaeoherpeton
