= Aversor =

Aversor Temporal range: Early Permian, Ufimian (late Kungurian)

Scientific classification
- Domain: Eukaryota
- Kingdom: Animalia
- Phylum: Chordata
- Clade: Sarcopterygii
- Clade: Tetrapodomorpha
- Order: †Embolomeri
- Family: †Eogyrinidae
- Genus: †Aversor; Gubin, 1985

Type species
- Aversor dmitrievi Gubin, 1985

Extinct genus of tetrapodomorphs

Aversor is an extinct genus of embolomere which lived in the Early Permian of Russia. It contains a single species, Aversor dmitrievi, which is based on skull and jaw fragments from the Intinskaya Svita (Inta Formation) near Pechora. It may have been the youngest known eogyrinid, and was the youngest known embolomere until the discovery of Seroherpeton, a Late Permian embolomere described in 2020. Aversor and Seroherpeton both lived at higher latitudes than older embolomeres, suggesting that the group abandoned arid equatorial areas prior to their final demise.
