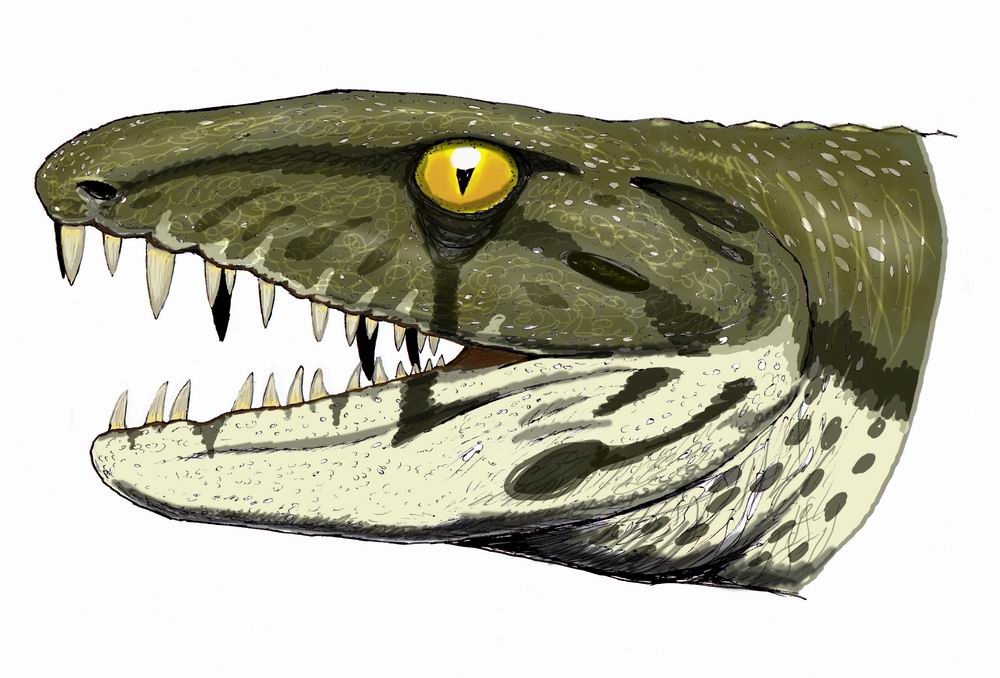
- Artist's reconstruction of A. russelli
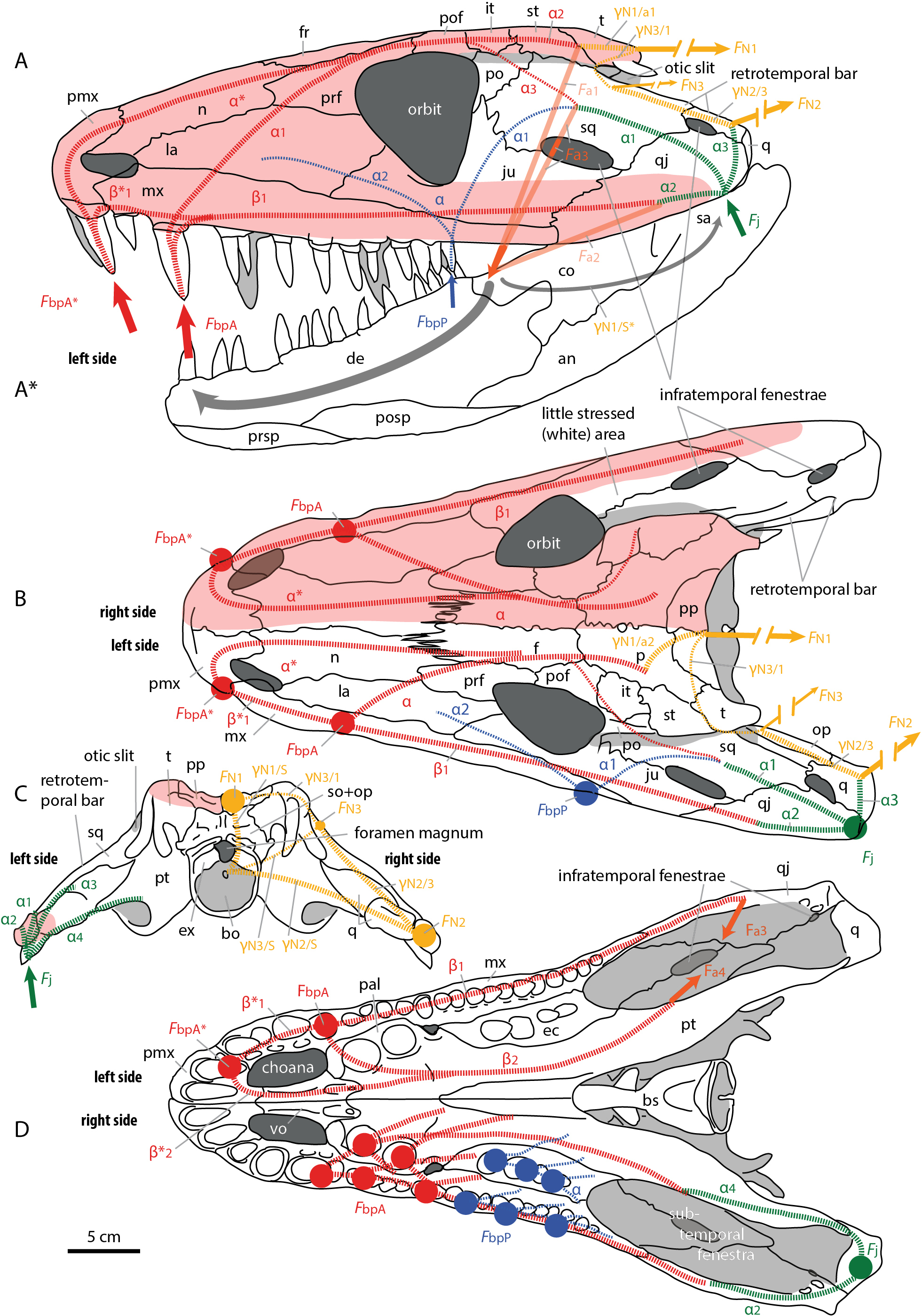
- Skull diagram

Scientific classification
- Kingdom: Animalia
- Phylum: Chordata
- Order: †Embolomeri
- Family: †Anthracosauridae; Cope, 1875
- Genus: †Anthracosaurus; Huxley, 1863

Type species
- †Anthracosaurus russelli Huxley, 1863

Species
- †A. russelli Huxley, 1863; †A. lancifer (Newberry, 1856 [originally Rhizodus lancifer])

= Anthracosaurus =

Anthracosaurus Temporal range: Westphalian A – Westphalian B (late Bashkirian – early Moscovian)

Extinct genus of tetrapodomorphs

Anthracosaurus is an extinct genus of embolomere that lived during the Late Carboniferous (around 315 million years ago) in what is now Scotland, England, and the United States. Measuring around 10 ft (3.0 m) long, it was a large, aquatic eel-like predator. It has a robust skull about 40 centimetres (1.3 ft) in length with large teeth in the jaws and on the roof of the mouth. Anthracosaurus probably inhabited swamps, rivers and lakes. Its name is Greek for "coal lizard".

== Discovery and specimens ==
=== Scotland ===
The genus and type species Anthracosaurus russelli were named by Thomas Henry Huxley in 1863, based on fossils acquired by mining surveyor James Russell in 1861. Nearly all fossils were found near Airdrie, in the historic County Lanarkshire of Scotland. Geologically speaking, they hail from the Blackband Ironstone of the Scottish Middle Coal Measures. In traditional European stratigraphy, this layer would be dated to the Westphalian B, corresponding to the early-middle part of the Pennsylvanian (Late Carboniferous). The holotype is a large flattened cranium embedded in an ironstone nodule. Due to the tough mineral encrustation, it would take more than a century for the skull to be fully prepared and cleared of matrix. Subsequent to Huxley's original description, incremental preparation allowed for the skull to be redescribed by Watson (1929) and later Panchen (1977). Other fossils from Airdrie include lower jaw fragments, teeth, vertebrae, and possibly a partial interclavicle. It is uncertain whether the postcranial fossils truly belong to Anthracosaurus. The vertebrae are undiagnostic beyond their embolomerous form, while the interclavicle shows similarity to that of Pholiderpeton.

=== England ===
A second, less complete skull from Washington (in the historic County Durham of England) was assigned to Anthracosaurus russelli by Panchen et al. (1967). It is slightly older than the Scottish fossils, dating to the Lower Coal Measures (Westphalian A). Panchen (1981) expanded the list of English fossils with an incomplete jaw stored in the Hancock Museum, possibly from the Lower Main Seam of Newsham, Northumberland (Westphalian B). Clack (1987) described two additional Anthracosaurus fossils from Newsham: a partial skull roof (previously referred to Pteroplax cornuta or Eogyrinus attheyi) and an isolated jugal bone.

=== Ohio ===
Romer (1963) showed that the tooth of an animal that J. S. Newberry named "Rhizodus lancifer," from the Diamond Coal Mine, a Carboniferous site in Linton, Ohio, belonged to a species of Anthracosaurus. Now known as Anthracosaurus lancifer, this species is represented by a collection of isolated teeth, vertebrae, and molds of a snout and shoulder girdle. The snout shows enlarged premaxillary teeth, but this trait is present in other American embolomeres like Eobaphetes and Neopteroplax. Another embolomere described from Linton, Leptophractus obsoletus, probably represents an early growth phase of Anthracosaurus lancifer.
