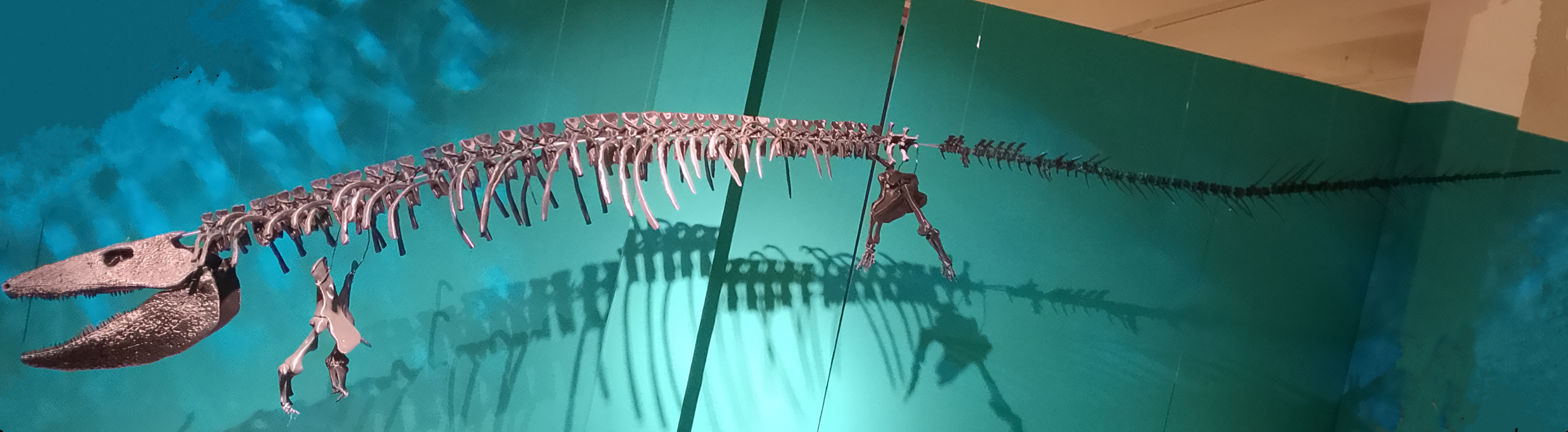
- Mounted skeleton
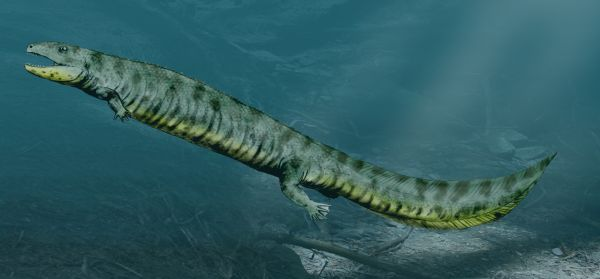
- Restoration

Scientific classification
- Kingdom: Animalia
- Phylum: Chordata
- Order: †Embolomeri
- Family: †Eogyrinidae
- Genus: †Pholiderpeton; Huxley, 1869

Type species
- Pholiderpeton scutigerum Huxley, 1869

Other species
- Pholiderpeton attheyi? (Watson, 1926; formerly Eogyrinus)

= Pholiderpeton =

Pholiderpeton Temporal range: Bashkirian

Extinct genus of tetrapodomorphs

Pholiderpeton (from Greek: φολῐ́δος folĭdos, 'horny scale' and Greek: ἑρπετόν herpetón, 'creeping thing') is an extinct genus of embolomere amphibian which lived in the Late Carboniferous period (Bashkirian) of England. The genus was first named by Thomas Henry Huxley in 1869 to include the species P. scutigerum, based on the disarticulated front half of a skeleton discovered near Bradford, Yorkshire.

In 1987, Jennifer A. Clack suggested that a different embolomere, Eogyrinus attheyi from Newsham, Northumberland, belonged to the same genus as Pholiderpeton. She subsumed the genus Eogyrinus into Pholiderpeton and created the new combination P. attheyi.

Pholiderpeton scutigerum measured 2 metres (6 ft 7 in) in length, while specimens of P. attheyi had 41 centimetres (16 in) long skull and could measure up to 4 metres (13 ft) long. The latter species was thus among the largest Carboniferous tetrapods, and perhaps one of the largest of its family, the Eogyrinidae.

== History ==
=== Pholiderpeton scutigerum ===
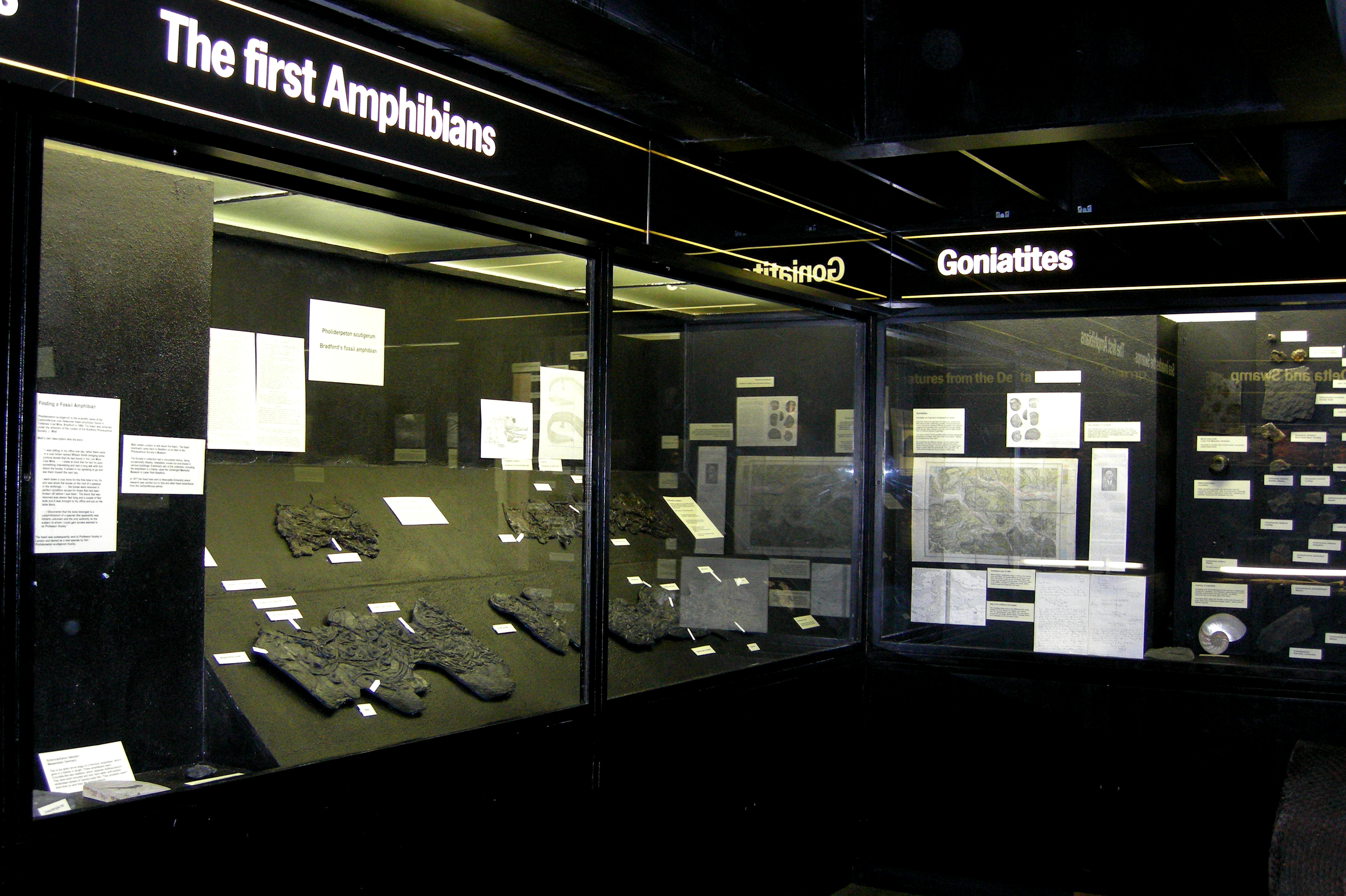
The Pholiderpeton scutigerum holotype on display at the Cliffe Castle Museum

The holotype of Pholiderpeton scutigerum is a partial skeleton found in the Black-bed coal layer exposed at Toftshaw colliery near Bradford, Yorkshire. The specimen was initially described by Thomas Henry Huxley in 1869, with further discussion by Louis C. Miall (1870) and D.M.S. Watson (1926, 1929). The specimen was prepared more fully in the late 20th century, enabling a more detailed description by Jenny Clack (1983, 1987). The Black-bed coal is dated to the Westphalian A regional stage of the Carboniferous, equivalent to part of the global Bashkirian stage. Pholiderpeton scutigerum is one of the oldest embolomeres known from the English coal measures.

The Toftshaw skeleton preserves a disarticulated skull (missing much of the snout and skull table), most of the right forelimb and shoulder, fragments of the left forelimb, a few vertebrae, ribs, and numerous scales. It is split across 25 smaller pieces in three large chunks, each coated with scales and Lepidodendron bark. Watson (1929) suggested that the animal died while sheltering in a Lepidodendron trunk, with the rear part of the body eaten by fish and other scavengers. Clack (1987), on the other hand, argued that the animal died in a river, with decay and a constant current carrying away most of its body before the front half was covered by mud and a fallen tree. Most of the skeleton (specimen NS 111.81) now resides at the Cliffe Castle Museum in Keighley. In 1875, a few pieces of the holotype were purchased by the Museum of Comparative Zoology in Cambridge, Massachusetts. The Natural History Museum in London acted in a similar fashion in 1895. Beyond the holotype, all three museums have acquired various isolated fragments from Toftshaw and the nearby Low Moor industrial site. A partial Pholiderpeton skull from Swanwick, Derbyshire (specimen A2) is housed at King's College London.

=== Pholiderpeton (Eogyrinus) attheyi ===
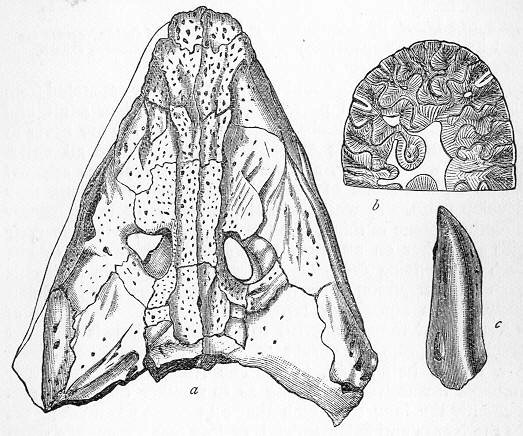
Illustration of the lectotype of "Eogyrinus" attheyi

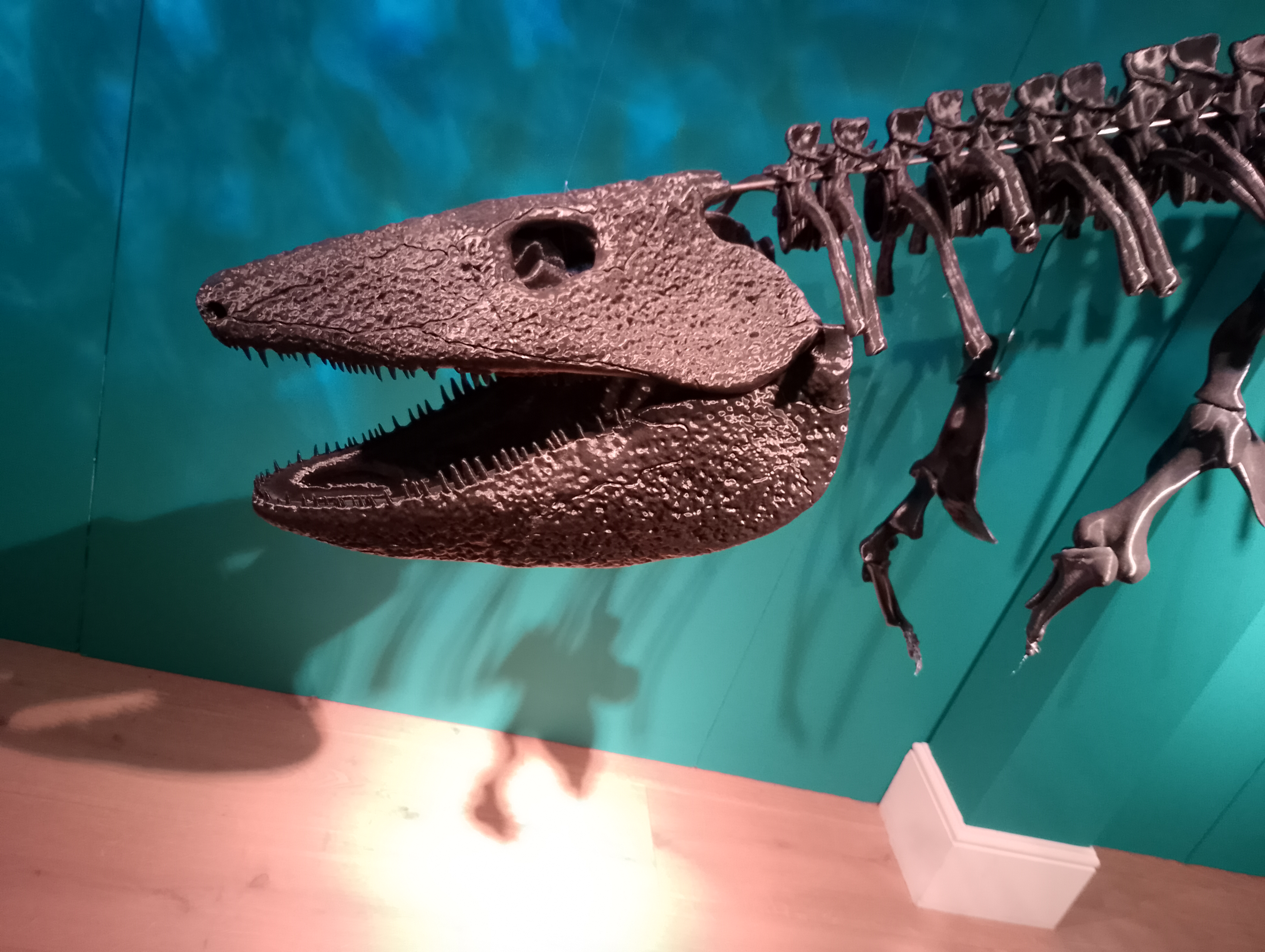
Cast of skull and forelimbs of Pholiderpeton sp.

In 1876, Thomas Atthey reported an enormous amphibian skull from the Low Main coal seam at Newsham, a neighborhood of Blyth, Northumberland. The skull was associated with vertebrae, ribs, scales, and a single femur (thigh bone). Atthey originally identified the skull as Anthracosaurus russelli. Watson (1912) later referred the Newsham skull to Pteroplax, but in 1926 he decided to give it its own genus and species: Eogyrinus attheyi, in honor of Atthey.

The giant lectotype skull (specimen G 13.71) is far from the only embolomere fossil found at Newsham, as skull material and strings of vertebrae are not uncommon at the site. Most "Eogyrinus" attheyi fossils are stored at the Hancock Museum in Newcastle upon Tyne. An isolated skull table stored at the Natural History Museum in London (specimen R 8426) was also sourced from Newsham. Newsham's Low Main coal seam dates to the Westphalian B regional stage, younger than the Black-bed coal which produced the holotype of Pholiderpeton scutigerum.

A.L. Panchen (1972) identified several Scottish embolomere skulls as Eogyrinus attheyi, though Clack (1987) classified them all as Pholiderpeton sp. Specimen GS 28318 is a snout and right jaw collected from Airdrie, North Lanarkshire, Scotland by the British Geological Survey. The corresponding left jaw is stored at the Manchester Museum. A partial skull and a few postcranial bones are stored at the National Museum of Scotland in Edinburgh.

"Eogyrinus", Anthracosaurus, and Pteroplax all share the same time interval (Westphalian B) and some of the same sites (Newsham, Airdrie). As a result, individual specimens were frequently shuffled between the three taxa for over a century. Much of the confusion was resolved when "Eogyrinus" was fully redescribed by Panchen (1964, 1966, 1972). Clack (1987) dealt with the last few points of contention: an Anthracosaurus skull table from Newsham and a Pholiderpeton interclavicle from Airdrie, each previously misidentified as the opposite genus. Watson's 1926 reconstruction of "Eogyrinus" attheyi included a large boxy shoulder girdle, but later authors concluded that this set of bones actually belonged to a lobe-finned fish, probably a rhizodont.

In 1958, Alfred Sherwood Romer attempted to name another species, Pholiderpeton bretonensis, based on jaw material from the Point Edward Formation of Nova Scotia. Later scrutiny noted that these jaws shared no diagnostic traits with Pholiderpeton, rendering Pholiderpeton bretonensis an invalid species of indeterminate embolomere fossils.

== Classification ==
Clack (1987) concluded that the only significant anatomical difference between Pholiderpeton scutigerum and "Eogyrinus" attheyi is that "Eogyrinus" attheyi has fewer dentary teeth. As a result, she synonymized the two genera, with the name Pholiderpeton preceding Eogyrinus by over half a century.

Some phylogenetic analyses, such as those by Marcello Ruta & Michael Coates (2007) and David Marjanović & Michel Laurin (2019), have argued that Pholiderpeton scutigerum and "Eogyrinus" attheyi were not closely related to each other. However, neither publication reinstated the genus Eogyrinus.

Below is the results of Marjanović and Laurin (2019), only showing Anthracosauria.

- Anthracosauria
  - Silvanerpeton
  - - Eoherpeton
    - - Proterogyrinus
      - Embolomeri
        - - Archeria
          - Pholiderpeton scutigerum (type)
        - - Pholiderpeton attheyi
          - Anthracosaurus
