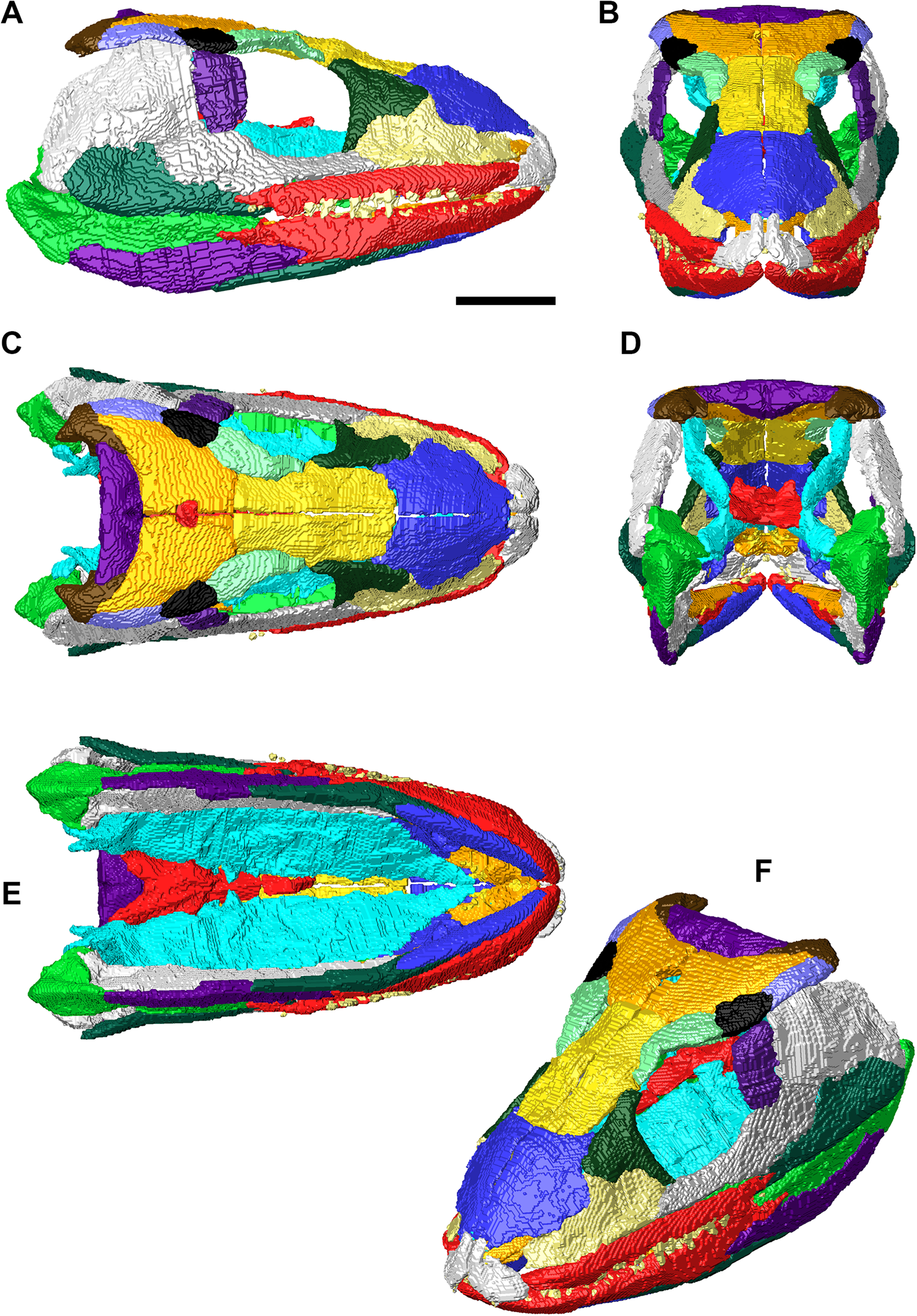
- Three-dimensional reconstruction of the skull
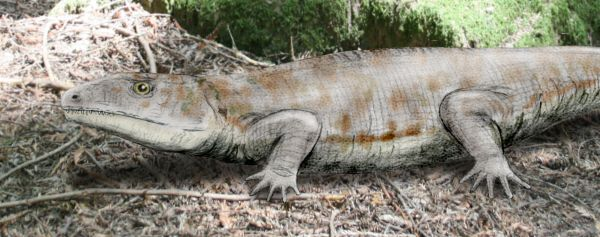
- Life restoration

Scientific classification
- Kingdom: Animalia
- Phylum: Chordata
- Order: †Embolomeri
- Family: †Eoherpetontidae; Panchen, 1980
- Genus: †Eoherpeton; Panchen, 1975

Species
- E. watsoni (type)

= Eoherpeton =

Eoherpeton Temporal range: Late Visean to Namurian 346–313 Ma

Extinct genus of tetrapodomorphs

Eoherpeton is the only genus of the family Eoherpetontidae in the extinct suborder Embolomeri. It is known from the Visean and Namurian (now Serpukhovian and lower Bashkirian) stages of the Carboniferous of Scotland.
