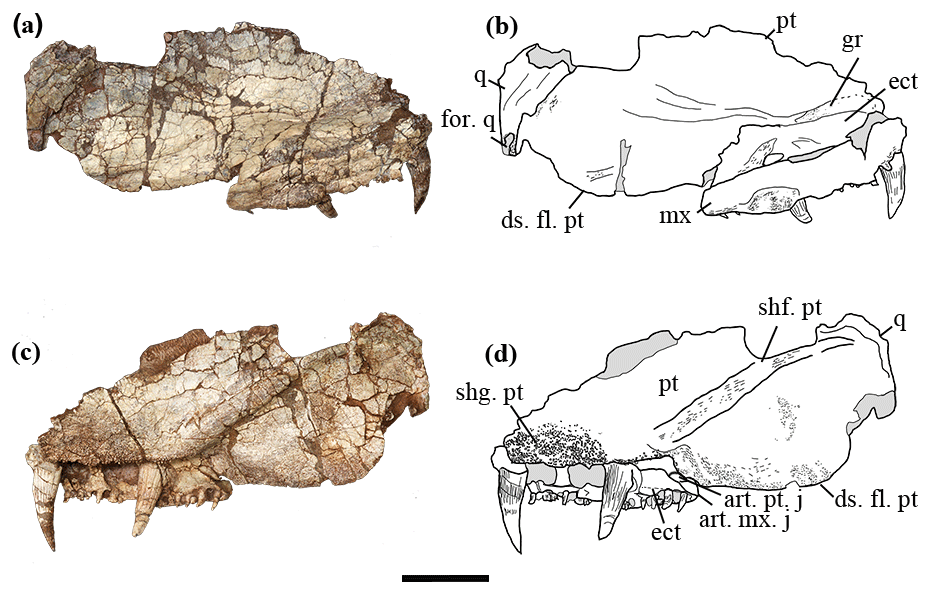

Scientific classification
- Domain: Eukaryota
- Kingdom: Animalia
- Phylum: Chordata
- Clade: Sarcopterygii
- Clade: Tetrapodomorpha
- Order: †Embolomeri
- Genus: †Seroherpeton; Chen & Liu, 2020

Type species
- Seroherpeton yangquanensis Chen & Liu, 2020

= Seroherpeton =

Seroherpeton Temporal range: Late Wuchiapingian

Extinct genus of tetrapodomorphs

Seroherpeton is an extinct genus of embolomere known from the Late Permian aged Sunjiagou Formation of Northern China. It is the youngest known embolomere, with the previous youngest members being from the Cisuralian, and also lived further north than any other embolomere, with all other known members of the group being from Euramerica. It is known from a partial skull, consisting of portions of the maxilla, ectopterygoid, pterygoid and quadrate.
