= Carbonoherpeton =

Carbonoherpeton Temporal range: Middle Pennsylvanian, Westphalian D (Moscovian)

Scientific classification
- Domain: Eukaryota
- Kingdom: Animalia
- Phylum: Chordata
- Clade: Sarcopterygii
- Clade: Tetrapodomorpha
- Order: †Embolomeri
- Genus: †Carbonoherpeton; Klembara, 1985

Type species
- Carbonoherpeton carrolli Klembara, 1985

Extinct genus of tetrapodomorphs

Carbonoherpeton is an extinct genus of embolomere which lived in the Pennsylvanian (late Carboniferous) of Nova Scotia, Canada.
