= Leptophractus =

Leptophractus Temporal range: Pennsylvanian

Scientific classification
- Domain: Eukaryota
- Kingdom: Animalia
- Phylum: Chordata
- Clade: Sarcopterygii
- Clade: Tetrapodomorpha
- Order: †Embolomeri
- Family: †Eogyrinidae
- Genus: †Leptophractus; Cope, 1873

Type species
- †Leptophractus obsoletus Cope, 1873

Extinct genus of tetrapodomorphs

Leptophractus is an extinct genus of embolomere described from an Upper Carboniferous coal mine at Linton, Ohio. It probably represents a young growth interval, and is therefore a synonym, of Anthracosaurus lancifer, which was described much earlier from the same deposit at Linton.
