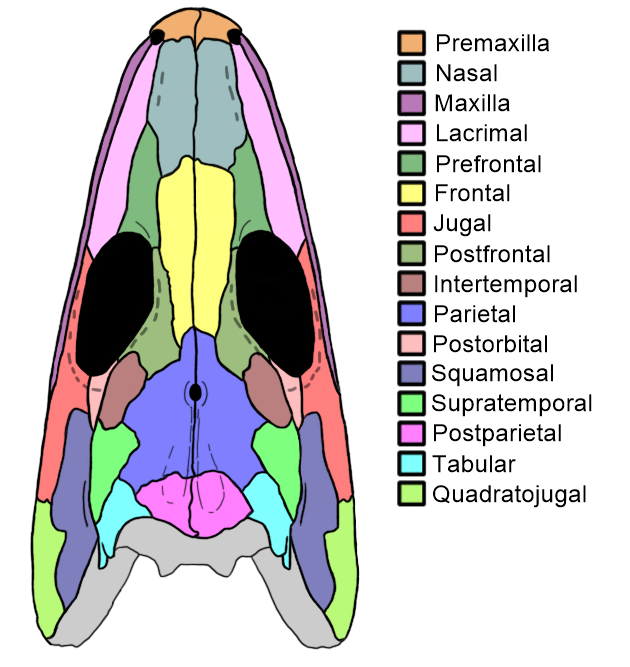
- Skull diagram

Scientific classification
- Kingdom: Animalia
- Phylum: Chordata
- Order: †Embolomeri
- Family: †Proterogyrinidae
- Genus: †Proterogyrinus; Romer, 1970

Type species
- †Proterogyrinus scheelei Romer, 1970

Other species
- †P. pancheni Smithson, 1986

Synonyms
- Mauchchunkia Hotton, 1970

= Proterogyrinus =

Proterogyrinus Temporal range: Mississippian (Viséan to Serpukhovian), 331–323 Ma

Extinct genus of amphibians

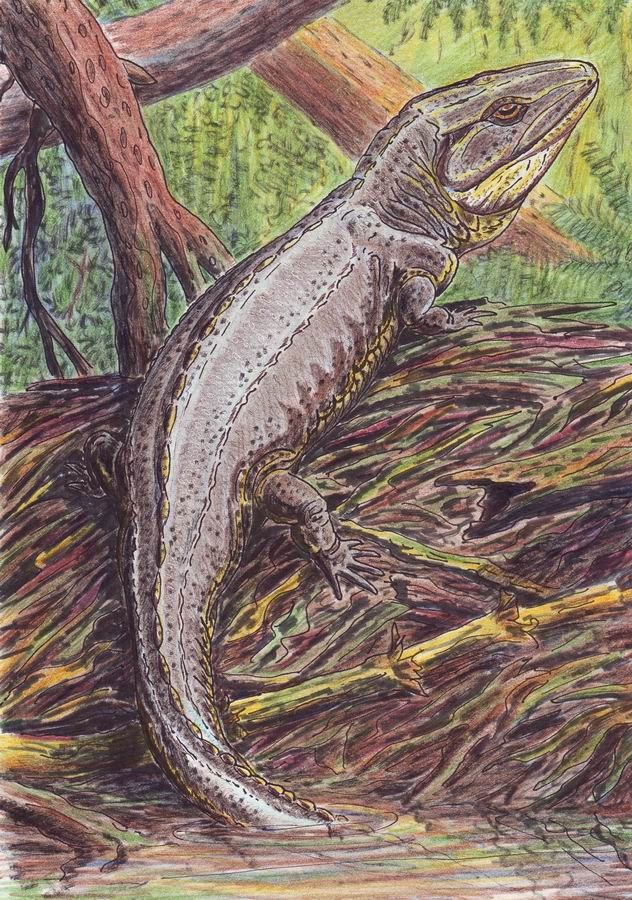
Life restoration of Proterogyrinus

Proterogyrinus is an extinct genus of early tetrapods from the order Embolomeri. Fossil remains of Proterogyrinus have been found in Scotland, UK, and West Virginia, United States, and date back to the Serpukhovian (mid-Carboniferous period), which is from about 331 to 323 million years ago. The genus was originally named by renowned vertebrate paleontologist Alfred Sherwood Romer in 1970. A comprehensive redescription was later published by Canadian paleontologist Robert Holmes in 1984. The generic name "Proterogyrinus" is Greek for "earlier wanderer" or "earlier tadpole". This name was chosen by Romer in keeping with a trend of naming long-bodied early tetrapods (such as Eogyrinus and Crassigyrinus) with the suffix "-gyrinus".

Romer hesitated from designating Proterogyrinus as a true embolomere, because its intercentra (the forward portion of each vertebra) were smaller than its pleurocentra (the rear portion). He used the group Anthracosauria to encompass embolomeres and their close relatives such as Proterogyrinus. However, other sources prefer a wider definition of Embolomeri similar in usage to Romer's Anthracosauria, thus counting Proterogyrinus as an embolomere.

== Description ==
In most respects Proterogyrinus resembled other embolomeres such as Archeria, with a moderately elongated skull that was taller than that of other early tetrapods such as colosteids and temnospondyls. Members of the genus had strong limbs with several fully-ossified ankle and wrist bones. This would have given Proterogyrinus the ability to walk and hunt on land. However, the presence of lateral line grooves and otic notches which likely held spiracles show that they were probably more well-adapted for the water. The tail was long and tall, and was likely a powerful method of locomotion. The eyes were positioned high on the skull, supporting the idea that Proterogyrinus had an active lifestyle near the surface of the water.
