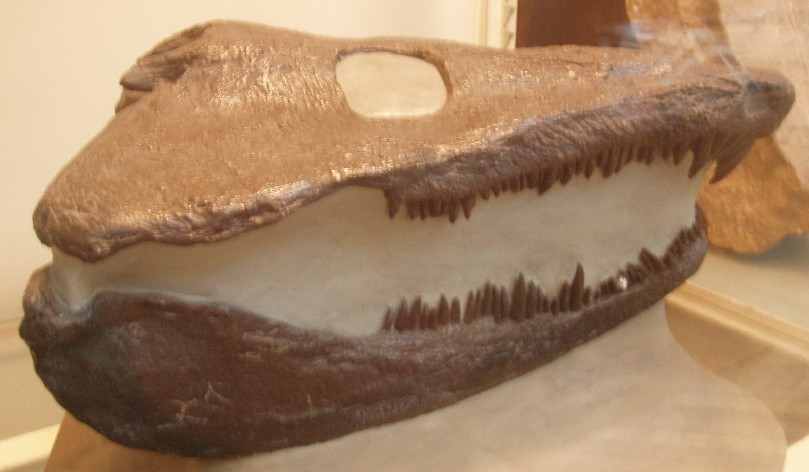

Scientific classification
- Kingdom: Animalia
- Phylum: Chordata
- Order: †Embolomeri
- Family: †Archeriidae
- Genus: †Cricotus; Cope, 1875

Type species
- †Cricotus heteroclitus (nomen dubium) Cope, 1875

= Cricotus =

Extinct genus of tetrapodomorphs

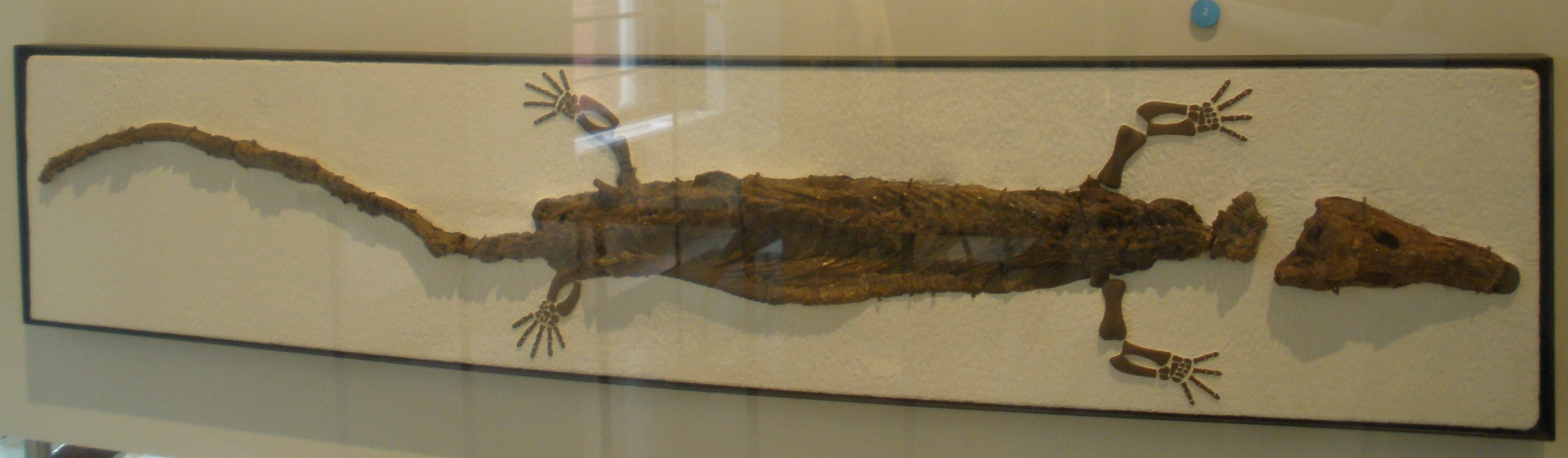
A skeleton of Cricotus crassidens (specimen AMNH 4550)

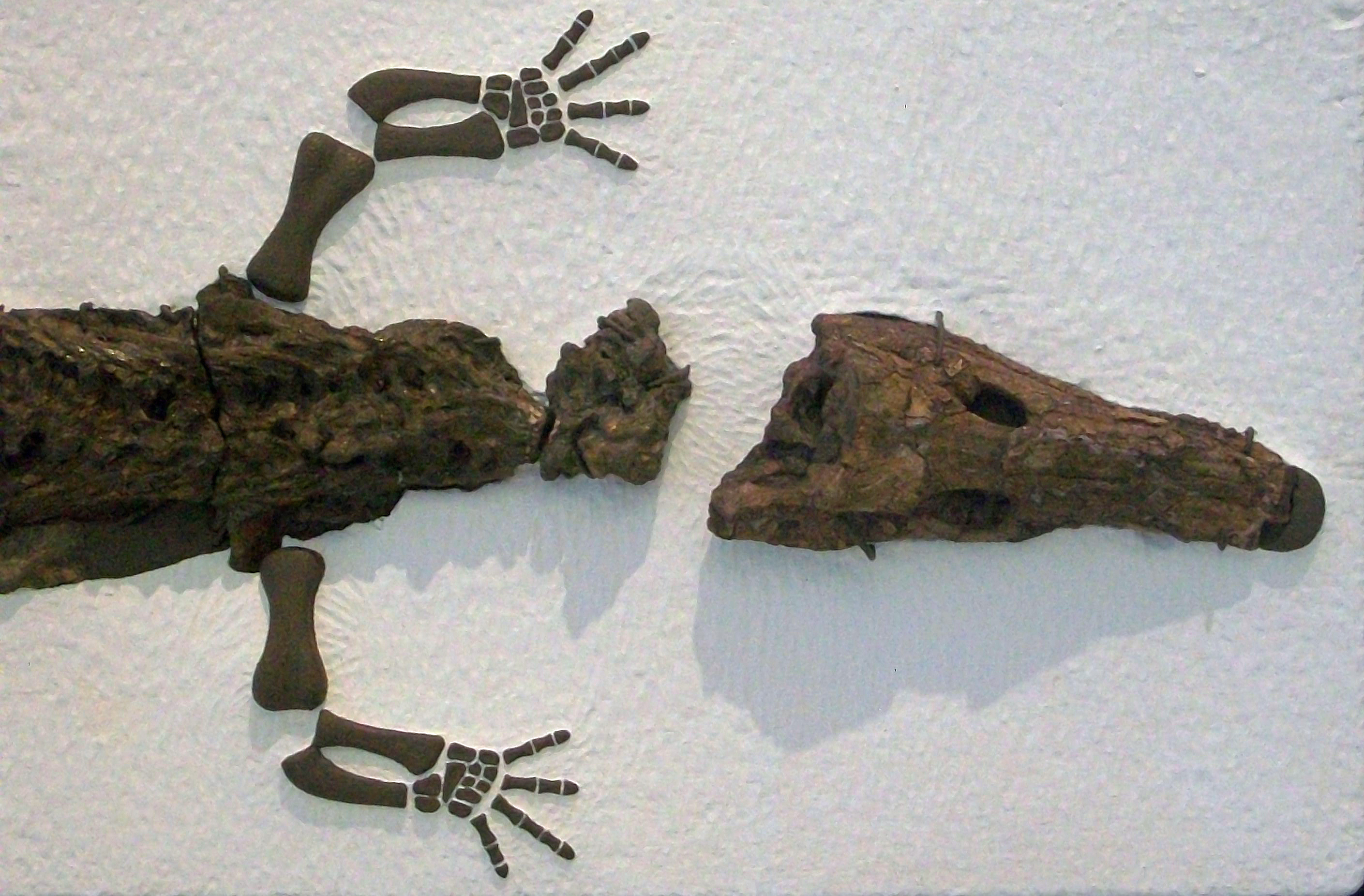
Detail of the skull and limbs of AMNH 4550

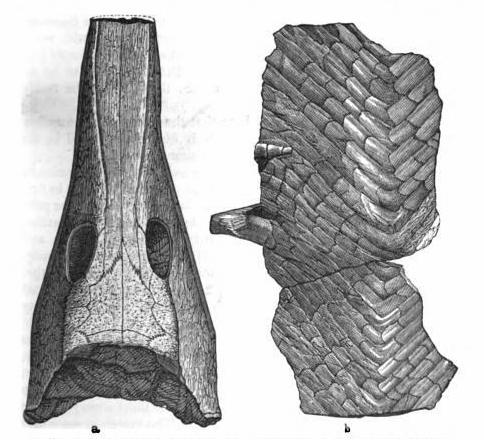
Illustration of the skull and ventral scutes of Cricotus heteroclitus by Edward Drinker Cope.

Cricotus is an extinct genus of Embolomeri. It was erected by Cope in 1875, on the basis of fragmentary, not clearly associated remains including caudal vertebrae, on which the name was established (in fact, based on a single intercentrum), as well as a few other postcranial bones. It was little-used in the subsequent literature, contrary to Archeria, which appears to be a junior synonym of Cricotus. However, given that the type species of Cricotus (C. heteroclitus) is a nomen dubium, the name Cricotus is unavailable. This led to Holmes suggesting using the name Archeria for this taxon, though he provided no evidence that he made a formal appeal to the International Commission on Zoological Nomenclature for this (and presumably did not do so).
