= Calligenethlon =

Calligenethlon Temporal range: Late Carboniferous

Scientific classification
- Domain: Eukaryota
- Kingdom: Animalia
- Phylum: Chordata
- Clade: Sarcopterygii
- Clade: Tetrapodomorpha
- Order: †Embolomeri
- Family: †Eogyrinidae
- Genus: †Calligenethlon; Steen, 1934

Type species
- †Calligenethlon watsoni Steen, 1934

Extinct genus of tetrapodomorphs

Calligenethlon is an extinct genus of embolomere tetrapodomorphs from the Late Carboniferous of Joggins, Nova Scotia. It is the only definitively identified embolomere from the Joggins Fossil Cliffs and is the largest tetrapod to have been found preserved in lycopod tree stumps.
