= Palaeoherpeton =

Palaeoherpeton Temporal range: Pennsylvanian, Westphalian A-B

Scientific classification
- Kingdom: Animalia
- Phylum: Chordata
- Order: †Embolomeri
- Genus: †Palaeoherpeton; Panchen, 1970

Type species
- Palaeogyrinus decorus Watson, 1926

Extinct genus of tetrapodomorphs

Palaeoherpeton is an extinct genus of eogyrinid embolomere which lived in the Pennsylvanian (late Carboniferous) of Scotland. It is primarily known from a series of relatively small but well-preserved skulls. Some of these have among the best braincase and middle ear material known in embolomeres. Originally given the species name Palaeogyrinus decorus, this was later corrected to Palaeoherpeton decorum when it was determined that Palaeogyrinus was a name preoccupied by a genus of beetles.
