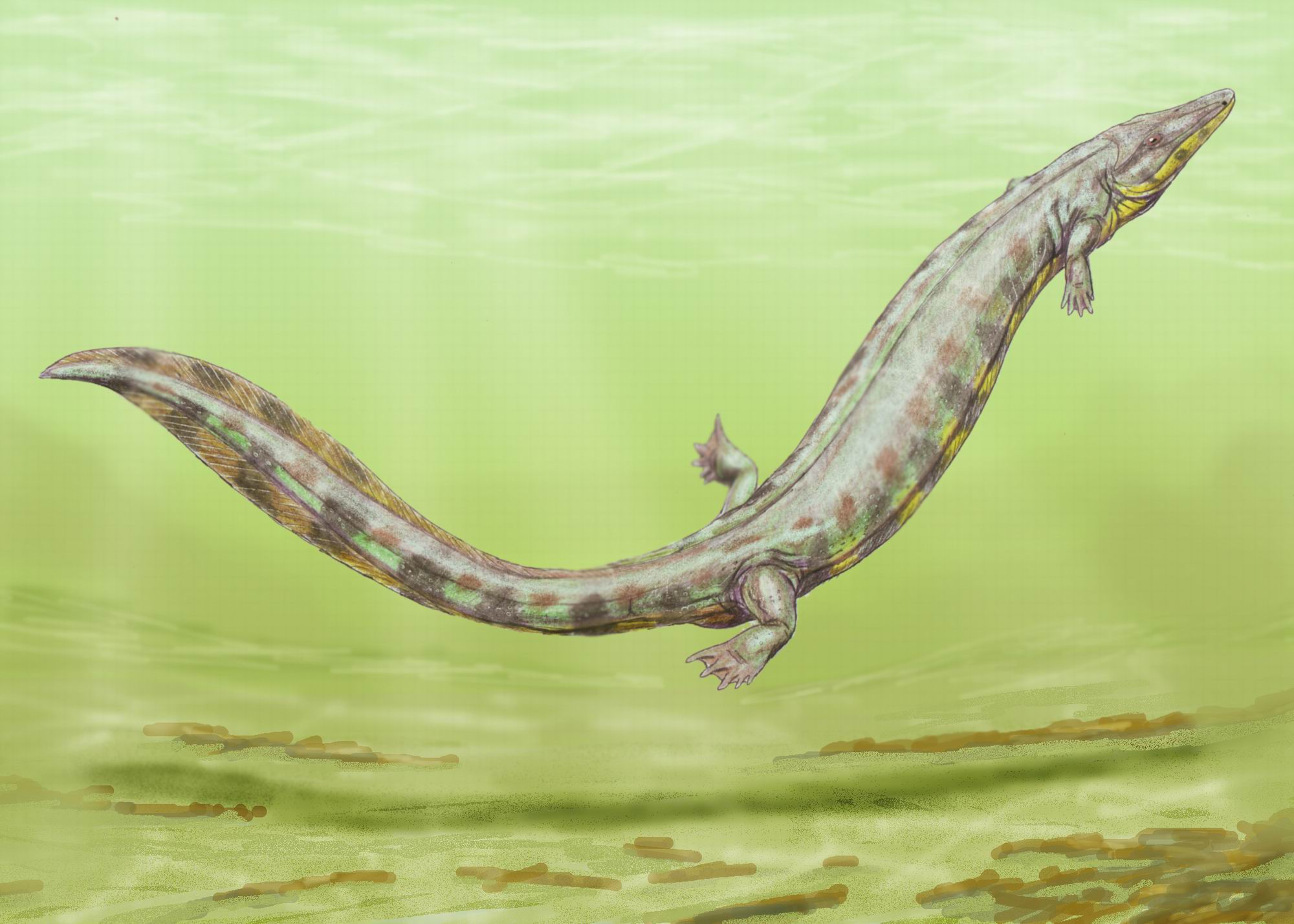
- Restoration of Archeria from the Lower Permian of Texas.
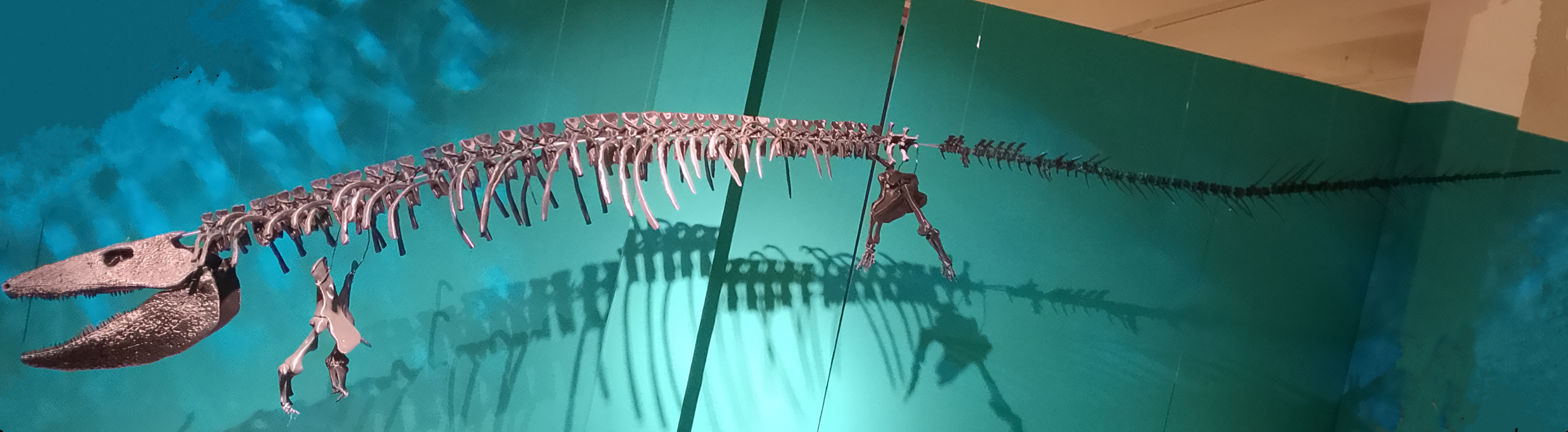
- Mounted skeleton of Pholiderpeton from the Late Carboniferous of Great Britain

Scientific classification
- Kingdom: Animalia
- Phylum: Chordata
- Clade: Stegocephali
- Order: †Embolomeri; Cope, 1885

Genera
- See text.

= Embolomeri =

Embolomeres Temporal range: Mississippian - Wuchiapingian

Extinct order of tetrapods

Embolomeri is an order of tetrapods or stem-tetrapods that were traditionally interpreted as members of Reptiliomorpha. Embolomeres first evolved in the Early Carboniferous (Mississippian) Period and were the largest and most successful predatory tetrapods of the Late Carboniferous (Pennsylvanian) Period. They were specialized semiaquatic predators with long bodies for eel-like undulatory swimming. Embolomeres are characterized by their vertebral centra, which are formed by two cylindrical segments, the pleurocentrum at the rear and intercentrum at the front. These segments are equal in size. Most other tetrapods have pleurocentra and intercentra which are drastically different in size and shape.

Embolomeres were among the earliest large carnivorous tetrapods, with members such as the crocodilian-like Proterogyrinus appearing in the Visean stage of the Carboniferous. They declined in diversity during the Permian period, though at least one representative (Archeria) was common in the Early Permian. Embolomeres went extinct shortly before the end of the Permian.

== Description ==
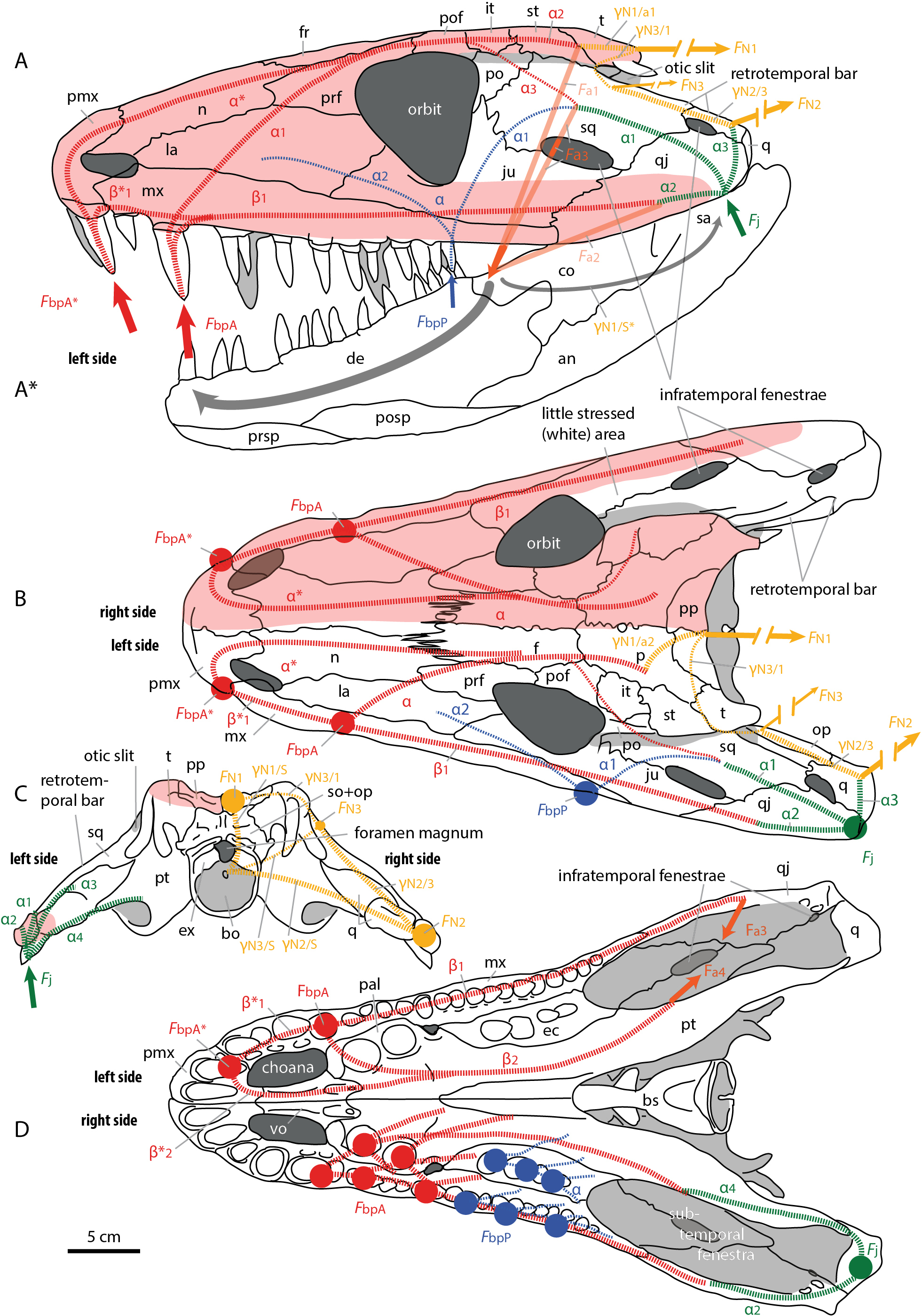
Skull of Anthracosaurus, with coloured lines showing stress dissipation during biting

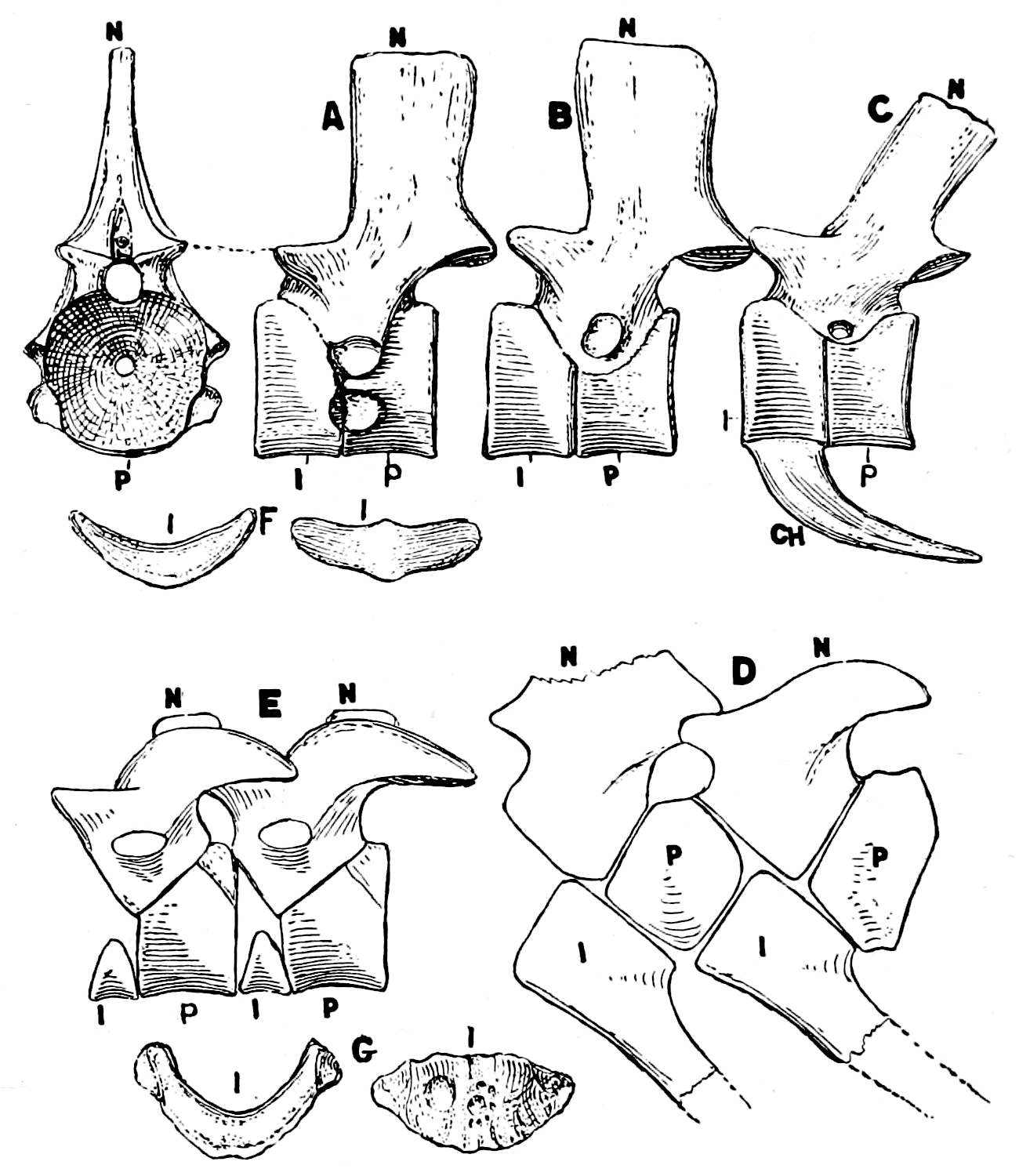
Vertebrae from several different tetrapods, with those of "Cricotus" (Archeria) in A-C, showing the large, cylindrical intercentra (I) and pleurocentra (P)

Embolomeres are characterised by having deep, narrow skulls, and an elongate body made up of vertebrae that have disc-shaped pleurocentra, which alternates with subsequally shaped intercentra. Some embolomeres could reach size large body sizes, 4 metres (13 ft) in the case of Pholiderpeton while others were considerably smaller. Some of the teeth were are distinctly enlarged and tusk-like.

== Paleoecology and paleobiology ==
Embolomeres are thought to have been aquatic predators ecologically analogous to modern crocodilians.

Probable embolomere hatchlings from Mazon Creek indicate that they underwent direct development rather than metamorphosis, in contrast to most modern amphibians. There are no external gills in the hatchlings, but there is a large internal yolk sac, a deep tail, small forelimbs, and large toughened lips (similar to some tadpoles). The femur (thigh bone) is ossified but the hindlimbs may still be internal at that early stage of development.

== Classification ==
The order Embolomeri was first named by Edward Drinker Cope in 1884 during his revision of "batrachian" (amphibian) evolution. Embolomeri was differentiated from several other newly named amphibian orders, such as "Rachitomi", by the presence of intercentra and pleurocentra of the same size and shape, that being large cylinders. At the time, embolomere fossils were uncommon, so Cope could only identify "cricotids" such as Cricotus as possessing embolomerous vertebrae. The genus name "Cricotus" is dubious, as it has been used by Cope to refer to embolomere fossils spanning anywhere between mid-Pennsylvanian deposits of Illinois and the Permian red beds of Texas. Most paleontologists now refer the red bed "Cricotus" specimens to the genus Archeria.

Michel Laurin (1998) formally defined Embolomeri as "the last common ancestor of Proterogyrinus and Archeria and all of its descendants." This definition excludes Eoherpeton, which is almost always considered a close ally of the group. Some authors place Silvanerpeton or chroniosuchians as close relatives as well, though they are generally agreed to lie outside Embolomeri proper.

The poorly defined group Anthracosauria is sometimes considered synonymous with Embolomeri, and the group's namesake, Anthracosaurus, is an embolomere. However, other authors use the term "Anthracosauria" in reference to a broader group which includes embolomeres in combination with various other reptile-like amphibians (reptiliomorphs). Reptiliomorphs are all tetrapods more closely related to living reptiles and synapsids (mammals and their ancestors), rather than living amphibians. Despite this, reptiliomorphs likely had amphibian-like biological traits, such as water-based reproduction.

Many studies conducted since the 1990s have also placed the group Lepospondyli as closer to amniotes than embolomeres were. Lepospondyls are a particularly unusual group of tetrapods, with some members (i.e. brachystelechids) very similar to lissamphibians and others (i.e. tuditanids) very similar to amniotes. If lepospondyls are both close relatives of amniotes and the ancestors of modern amphibians, then that means that crown-Tetrapoda (descendants of the common ancestor to all living tetrapods) is a much more restricted group than previously assumed. In this situation, various traditional orders of Tetrapoda such as Embolomeri and Temnospondyli actually would qualify as stem-tetrapods due to having evolved prior to the split between modern amphibians and amniotes.

However, most authors consider temnospondyls to be the ancestors of modern amphibians. This would suggest that embolomeres are likely reptiliomorphs (closer to reptiles) and within the clade Tetrapoda. However, even this classification is not stable, as many recent analyses have found embolomeres to be more basal than temnospondyls. New fossil evidence has found increasing support for the placement of Embolomeri outside of Tetrapoda, based on plesiomorphic anatomical features in this group including the presence of a tail fin and features otherwise only known in stem-tetrapods, such as an opening between the braincase bones known as a basicranial fissure.

Below is a cladogram from Ruta et al. (2003):

- Tetrapoda
  - - Eucritta melanolimnetes
    - Temnospondyli
  - - Caerorhachis bairdi
    - - - Eoherpeton watsoni
        - Embolomeri
          - Proterogyrinus scheelei
          - - Archeria crassidisca
            - Pholiderpeton scutigerum
            - - Anthracosaurus russelli
              - Pholiderpeton (Eogyrinus) attheyi
      - - Gephyrostegidae
        - - Solenodonsaurus janenschi
          - - Seymouriamorpha
            - - Lepospondyli
              - - Diadectomorpha
                - Amniota

Cladogram after Pardo, 2024:

- Tetrapodomorpha
  - †Eusthenopteron
  - †Panderichthys
  - - †Tiktaalik
    - limbs present
      - †Ymeria
      - †Ventastega
      - †Ichthyostega
      - - †Acanthostega
        - - †Aistopoda
          - †Whatcheeria
          - †Pederpes
          - - †Crassigyrinus
            - - †Greererpeton
              - - †Embolomeri
                - - - †Eucritta
                    - †Baphetes
                  - crown group Tetrapoda
                    - Temnospondyli (including Lissamphibia)
                    - - †Seymouriamorpha (Seymouria)
                      - - †Diadectomorpha (Limnoscelis)
                        - Amniota (including modern mammals, reptiles and birds)

== Genera ==
List of genera
Name	Age	Location	Notes	Images
Anthracosaurus	Pennsylvanian (Westphalian A-B)	United Kingdom (Scotland, England), United States (Ohio)	A large and widespread embolomere with a small number of oversized fangs compared to other members of the group. The namesake of Anthracosauria.	
Archeria	Early Permian	United States (Texas)	A common, late-surviving member of the group, sometimes considered a species of Cricotus	
Aversor	Early Permian (Ufimian)	Russia	Supposedly the latest surviving eogyrinid, but very poorly known	
Calligenethlon	Pennsylvanian (Bashkirian)	Canada (Nova Scotia)	The largest named tetrapod preserved inside lycopod tree stumps in the Joggins Fossil Cliffs	
Cricotus	Pennsylvanian	United States (Illinois)	Responsible for the identification of Embolomeri as a unique order of tetrapods, although its history is convoluted and its taxonomic validity is questionable	
Carbonoherpeton	Pennsylvanian (Westphalian D)	Canada (Nova Scotia)	A lightly-built member of the group with characteristics of both archeriids and eogyrinids	
Diplovertebron	Pennsylvanian (Moscovian)	Czech Republic	A small member of the group sometimes confused with Gephyrostegus	
Eobaphetes	Pennsylvanian	United States (Kansas)	A possible relative of Anthracosaurus, originally named "Erpetosuchus" until it was determined that the name was preoccupied by a Triassic reptile. Probably from Kansas, though its exact origin remains a mystery.	
Eoherpeton	Mississippian-Pennsylvanian (Visean-Bashkirian)	United Kingdom (Scotland)	One of the oldest and most basal members of the group (if it even counts as part of it), with vertebrae that were not fully embolomerous	
Leptophractus	Pennsylvanian (Westphalian D)	United States (Ohio)	Known from a skull found at the Linton Diamond Mine	
Neopteroplax	Pennsylvanian	United States (Ohio)	One of the largest Carboniferous limbed vertebrates known from North America	
Palaeoherpeton	Pennsylvanian (Westphalian A-B)	United Kingdom (Scotland)	An eogyrinid known as Palaeogyrinus from 1926 to 1970, until it was determined that this name was occupied by a genus of beetles	
Papposaurus	Mississippian-Pennsylvanian (Namurian)	United Kingdom (Scotland)	Known from a femur, may have been a relative of Proterogyrinus	
Pholiderpeton	Pennsylvanian (Westphalian A-B)	United Kingdom (England, Scotland)	An eogyrinid with two species: the older type species Pholiderpeton scutigerum and the younger species Pholiderpeton attheyi (also known as Eogyrinus). P. attheyi has the largest and best-preserved skull out of all UK embolomeres.	
Proterogyrinus	Mississippian (Serpukhovian)	United States (West Virginia), United Kingdom (Scotland)	An early member of the group possessing robust limbs but lacking certain adaptations of later members of the group	
Pteroplax	Pennsylvanian (Westphalian B)	United Kingdom (England)	Poorly known despite being among the first embolomeres to be described	
Seroherpeton	Late Permian (Wuchiapingian)	China	The youngest known embolomere by a significant margin	
Spondylerpeton	Pennsylvanian	United States (Illinois)	A close relative of Cricotus known from vertebrae found at the Mazon Creek fossil beds	
