= Interclavicle =

Bone which, in most tetrapods, is located between the clavicles

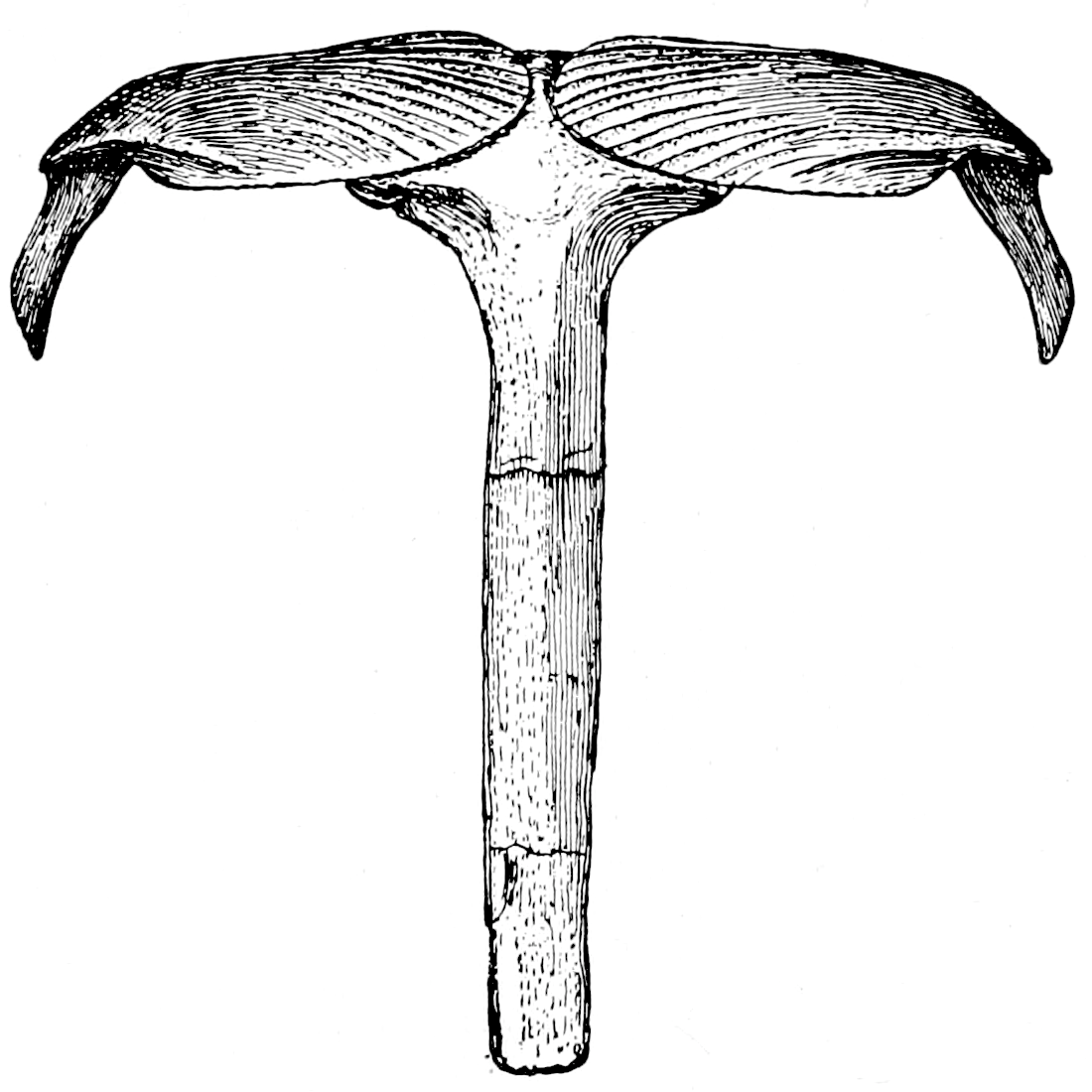
The rod-like interclavicle of Ophiacodon (a Permian synapsid) connected to a pair of rounded clavicles. Seen in ventral view (i.e. looking towards the chest from below)

An interclavicle is a bone which, in most tetrapods, is located between the clavicles. Therian mammals (marsupials and placentals) are the only tetrapods which never have an interclavicle, although some members of other groups also lack one. In therians, it is replaced by the sternum, which is similar in shape and function but forms via endochondral ossification (cartilage forming bone). The interclavicle, on the other hand, develops through intramembranous ossification of the skin.

The interclavicle is widely found in tetrapods, but has only been rarely reported in a few fish, in which it is small.
