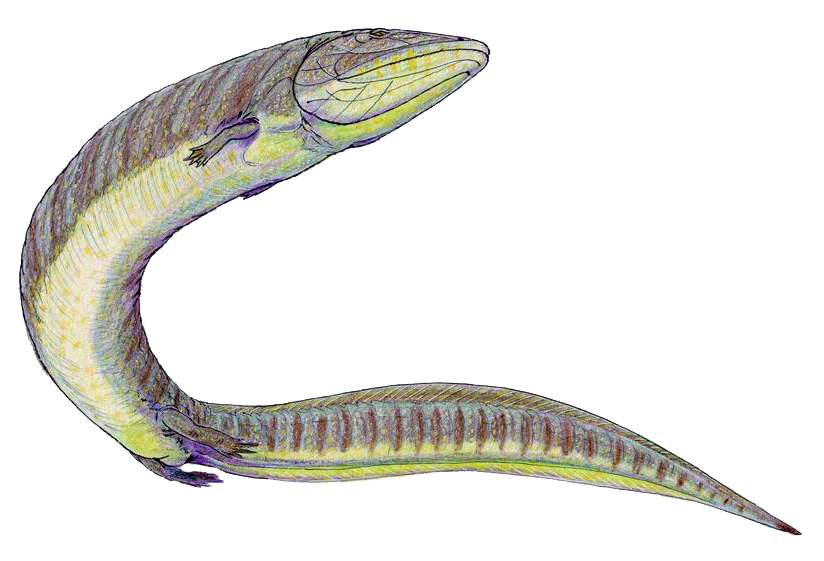
- Life restoration

Scientific classification
- Kingdom: Animalia
- Phylum: Chordata
- Order: †Embolomeri
- Genus: †Pteroplax; Hancock and Atthey, 1868

= Pteroplax =

Pteroplax Temporal range: Carboniferous

Extinct genus of tetrapodomorphs

Pteroplax is an extinct genus of embolomerous anthracosaur. Only one species (P. cornutus Hancock & Atthey, 1868) has been described; the skull table noted is the lectotype of this species. Pteroplax dates from the late Carboniferous Period, about 315 million years ago. It is known with certainty only from Newsham in Blyth, Northumberland, England. At that site, it shared a coal-swamp lake habitat with the larger embolomere, "Eogyrinus" (whose name is a junior synonym of Pholiderpeton Huxley, 1869). Pteroplax probably grew up to about 10 ft (3.0 m) in length and was largely aquatic, feeding upon fish and smaller tetrapods. It likely had a long, eel-like body, with short limbs and a long tail.

Although Pteroplax cornutus is known with total certainty only from the type specimen (an isolated skull table), Boyd (1978) described both cranial and postcranial elements from Newsham as probably belonging to this species. These included a series of embolomerous vertebrae significantly smaller than those of "Eogyrinus". Some of these had earlier been attributed to Pteroplax by Panchen (1966) but not described by him; a description of them was published by Boyd in 1980. Boyd (1978) also suggested that Pteroplax was a longer-snouted (as well as a smaller) embolomere than "Eogyrinus".

In her description of the large embolomere, Pholiderpeton scutigerum Huxley, Clack (1987) not only showed that "Eogyrinus" was a junior synonym of Pholiderpeton, but also removed Pteroplax from the family Eogyrinidae, noting that the lectotype skull table of P. cornutus showed similarities to embolomeres of the families Archeriidae and Proterogyrinidae.

== Etymology ==
Pteroplax means winged plate, in reference to the tabular horns of the isolated skull table that currently represents the only specimen certainly referable to this taxon.
