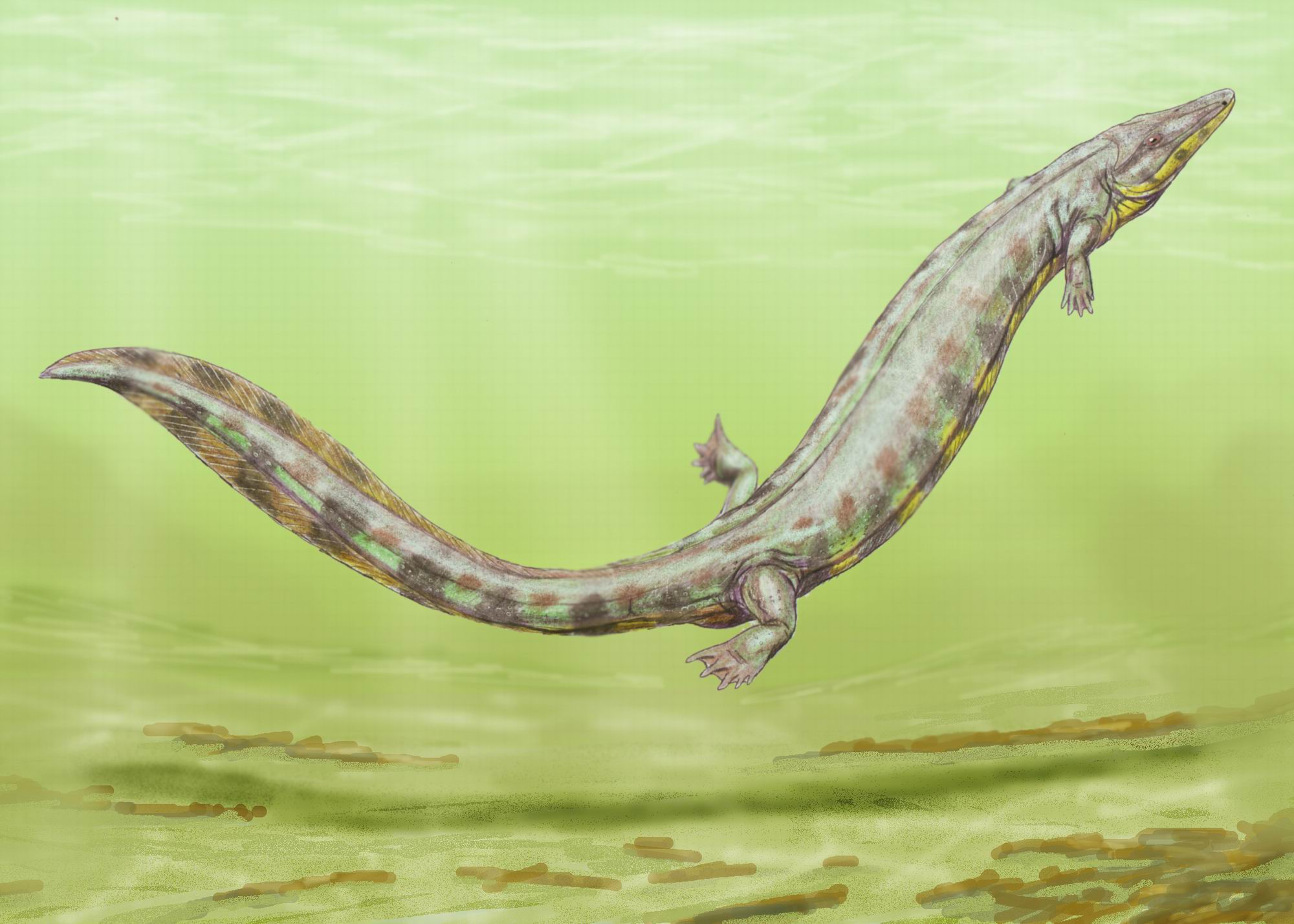
- Life restoration by Dmitry Bogdanov

Scientific classification
- Kingdom: Animalia
- Phylum: Chordata
- Order: †Embolomeri
- Family: †Archeriidae
- Genus: †Archeria; Case, 1918

Type species
- †Archeria crassidica Case, 1918

Species
- A. crassidisca; A. robinsoni; A. victori Stovall, 1948

= Archeria (animal) =

Archeria Temporal range: Early Permian

Extinct genus of tetrapodomorphs

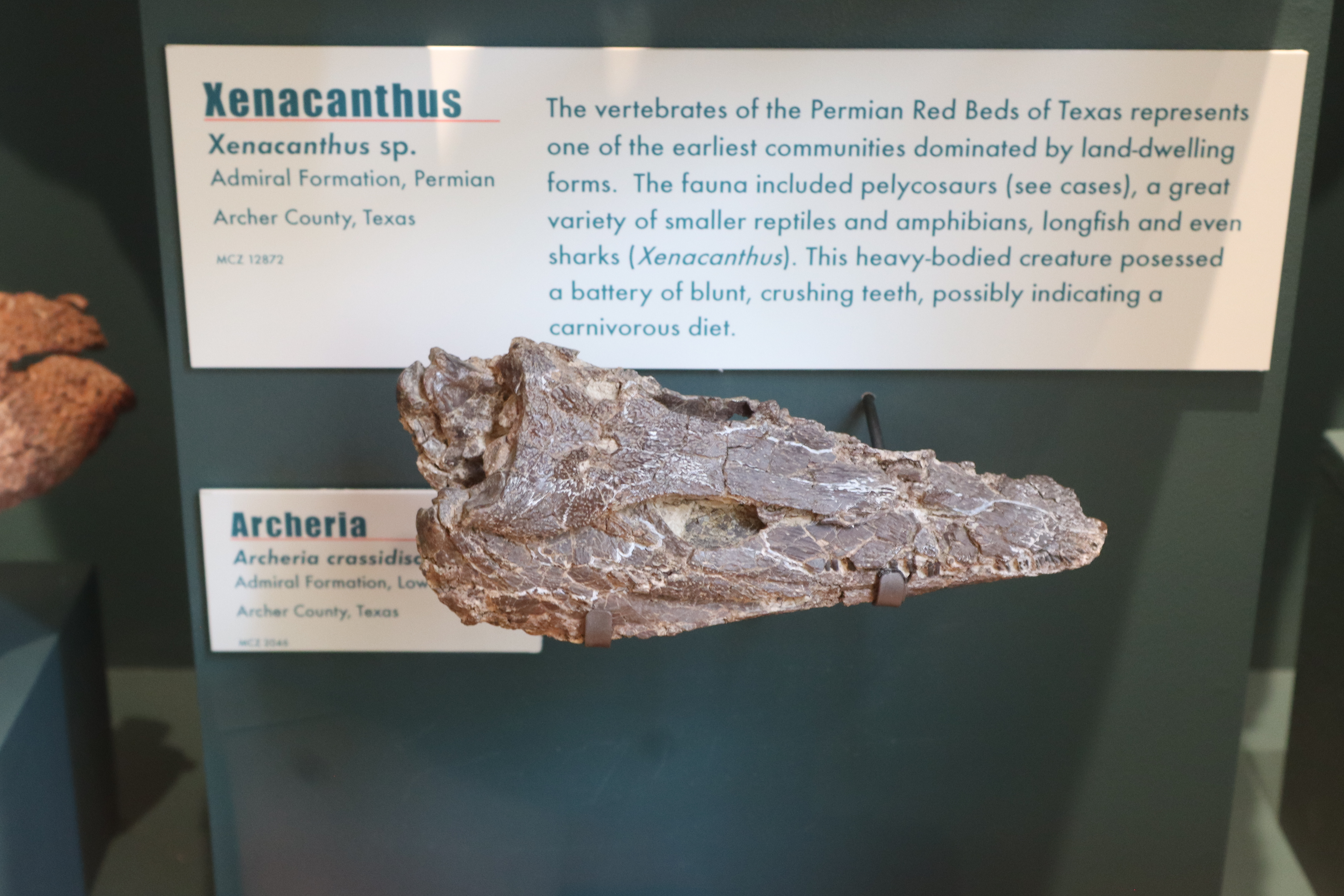
Skull of A. crassidisca, Harvard Museum of Natural History

Archeria is a genus of embolomere which lived in the Early Permian of Texas and Oklahoma. It was a medium-sized aquatic predator, with an elongated body and tail. The limbs were proportionally small but well-developed, connected to robust limb girdles. The skull was moderately long and low, up to 30 cm (12 inches) in length. Unlike most embolomeres, Archeria had many small chisel-shaped teeth instead of large fangs.

The anatomy of Archeria is well known compared to most embolomeres, as it is known from multiple complete skeletons discovered in 1939 by A.S. Romer. These specimens hail from the Geraldine bonebed, a deposit of the coastal Nocona Formation (formerly Admiral Formation) in Archer County, Texas. Other remains of the genus were previously referred to Cricotus, a North American embolomere of dubious validity.
