= Palatinichthys =

Palatinichthys Temporal range: Early Permian Autunian 300–287.5 Ma

Scientific classification
- Kingdom: Animalia
- Phylum: Chordata
- Clade: †Megalichthyiformes
- Family: †Megalichthyidae
- Genus: †Palatinichthys; Witzmann and Schoch, 2012

Type species
- Palatinichthys laticeps Witzmann and Schoch, 2012

Extinct genus of fishes

Palatinichthys is an extinct genus of megalichthyid lobe-fined fish from the early Permian of southwestern Germany. The holotype and only known specimen of the fish was found in sediment belonging to the upper Meisenheim Formation. Though it was first found in 1982 and placed in multiple genera throughout the 1990's and 2000's, the specimen would not be fully described until 2012 when it was assigned to its own genus. Based on the specimen, Palatinichthys was a medium-sized fish with the mostly complete fossil measuring 38 centimetres (15 in). The general anatomy of the fish is similar to its close relatives though features such as the abnormally-placed intertemporal and sensory pores on the mandible set it apart from other lobe-finned fish. The exact placement of Palatinichthys within Megalichthyidae largely place it as an early branching member of the family. Palatinichthys is believed to have lived in an environment dominated by deltas and large lakes, with the fish living in the deltas. The banks of these deltas would have been covered by a dense assemblage of plants with more arid environments being located further away. This entire area was effected by ashfalls that were a result of a large amount of explosive volcanic activity taking place in the region during this time. Other than Palatinichthys, a diverse assemblage of temnospondyls along with a few fish have been found at the formation.

== History and classification ==
The holotype and only known specimen of Palatinichthys (PW 1989/207-LS) was first discovered by Ingo and Rüdiger Meyer in 1982. The specimen, a largely complete fish, was found in sediments belonging to the upper Meisenheim Formation at the "Heinzköpfchen" locality which is located near Jeckenbach, Rhineland-Palatinate, southwestern Germany. After being collected, the specimen was then stored in the Museum für Naturgeschichte in Mainz in Germany. Six years after it was first discovered, the holotype was prepared by the two individuals who found it. In 1989, Rüdiger Meyer referred to the material as belonging to Megalichthys sp. in an unpublished diploma thesis. It would again be referenced the next year by Baumbauer who called it a crossopterygian and referenced its importance due to its close relation to tetrapods, though he did not describe or illustrated in the paper. In 1993, Schultze and Heidtke referred the specimen to the genus Ectosteorhachis, though did not give an explanation to this assignment. Later authors followed this assignment when referencing the specimen throughout the early 2000's. In 2012, Florian Witzmann and Rainer R. Schoch gave a full description of the specimen, assigning it to the new genus Palatinichthys.

The generic name of Palatinichthys is in derived from Palatinatus, which is the Latin word for the region of Germany where the specimen was found. The specific name "laticeps" is derived from Latin and translates to "wide head", referencing the broad skull of the fish.

=== Classification ===
In the 2012 description of the genus, Palatinichthys was placed as the sister genus to Ectosteorhachis, which in turn came out to be a sister group of the other members of Megalichthyidae. This is due to the length ratio between the parietal and postparietal bones being 0.7 or more. This is in contrast to the longer postorbital region seen in other members of the family like Cladarosymblema. The clades formed in this original phylogeny suggested the long and short faced groups within Megalichthyidae already split by the Late Devonian. A later 2021 paper by Alice M. Clement and coauthors contrasted this placement within the family, instead suggesting that Palatinichthys was the outgroup to the rest of Megalichthyidae. This outgroup position is due to the lack of a anterolateral process of the supratemporal, which all other members of the family possess. The phylogenies from both of these publications can be found below:

Witzmann & Scloch (2012)

- - - Gooloogongia
    - Barameda
  - - - - Gogonasus
        - Osteolepis
      - - Koharalepis
        - - - Koharalepis
            - Carbonichtys
          - - Panderichthys
            - Acanthostega
    - - Megalichthyidae
        - - Ectosteorhachis
          - Palatinichthys
        - - Cladarosymblema
          - - Sengoerichthys
            - Megalichthys

Clement et al. (2021)

- - Kenichthys
  - - Tungsenia
    - - Rhizodontida
      - - - 'Osteolepididae'
          - - Megalichthyidae
              - Palatinichthys
              - - Megalichthys hibberti
                - - Ectosteorhachis
                  - - Megalichthys laticeps
                    - Megalichthys mullisoni
                    - Cladarosymblema
                    - Sengoerichthys
                    - - Mahalalepis
                      - Askerichthys
            - - Canowindridae
        - - 'Tristichopteridae'
          - - 'Elpistostegalids'
            - - Tetrapoda

== Description ==
The holotype and only known specimen of Palatinichthys is made up of a single, largely complete individual that preserves portions of the body between the front of the snout and the pelvic fins. It was a medium-sized fish with the preserved portion of the skeleton measuring 38 centimetres (15 in).

=== Skull ===
Compared to other members of Megalichthyidae, the skull of Palatinichthys is relatively shorter and broader with this being reflected throughout its anatomy. Most bones in the anterior portion of the skull make up the parieto-ethmoidal shield. The front of the shield is made up of the paired naso-rostro-premaxillae which are roughly rectangular in shape. Directly posterior to these bones is the postrostral and nasal series. The former is a large, unpaired bone that is located at the midline of the skull. Unlike this bone, the nasal series is paired though it is unknown how many nasal bones make up the series due to the presence of a cosmine cover on the bones. Lateral to these bones are the supraorbitals which are represented by two pairs of bones, being the anterior and posterior supraorbitals. Both of these bones are short, causing them to only be present within the anteromedial region of the orbit. The short length of these bones result in the distance between the orbit and the naris being shorter than what is seen in other member of the family. Even with this more derived feature of the genus, the small orbits and thin naris are similar to what is seen in Megalichthys. The posterior half of the orbits is made up of the parietal bone which is much longer than the bones anterior to it. Posterolateral to the parietal is the a bone interpreted to be the intertemporal bone that, unlike the usual condition seen in tetrapodomorphs, both is in contact with the squamosal and makes up the posterior portion of the orbit. Due to the abnormal traits of the bone, the authors also suggest that it could be either a portion of or the full postorbital bone, though there is no evidence of fusion between the intertemporal and parietal bones so this is unlikely.

Behind the parieto-ethmoidal shield is the postparietal shield which makes up the rest of the skull roof of Palatinichthys. The postparietal bone is much longer than the parietal, due to the short length of the skull. It is rectangular in shape, being much longer than it is wide, and is the median-most bone of the shield. Both the supratemporal and tabular bones are in contact laterally with the postparietal. These bones are much smaller than the postparietal with the more anterior bone, the supratemporal, being larger than the tabular. Due to the shortness of the latter, it is much more broad than the supratemporal. Laterally contacting the tabular is a much smaller bone, the extratemporal. The back of the postparietal shield is made up of three extrascapulars with the posterior-most extrascapular being placed under and between the more anterior two.

Similar to what is seen in other lobe-finned fish, most bones of the skull not included in the parieto-ethmoidal and postparietal shields are included within the cheek unit. This includes the rest of the bones than make up the orbit including the lacrimal, jugal and postorbital along with the upper jaw. Unlike most other tetrapodomorphs, the maxilla possesses a number of pores located near the front and one the posterodorsal lamina. These are suggested to have originated from branches of the infraorbital canal that are found in the lacrimal and jugal bones. Sensory pores on the maxilla of Palatinichthys is also a feature seen in its close relative, Megalichthys. The largest bone in both the unit and the skull as a whole is the squamosal which is rectangular in shape. The posterior-most bone in the unit is the preoperculum, which is much taller than it is wider and is in contact with both the squamosal and quadratojugal. Behind it is the operculo-gular series which is largely made up of the operculum, the largest bone of the series. Towards the bottom of the bone, it overlaps suboperculum one. On the underside of the posterior section of the skull, the second suboperculum along with a two of the three pairs of submandibulars are preserved. The anterior-most portion of the series is made up of the smaller median gular and the much larger pair of lateral gulars found behind it.

=== Postcranium ===
Though generally similar to other members of the family with preserved postcranium, such as Ectosteorhachis and Megalichthys, features of the pectoral girdle do set it a part of its close relatives. The median portion of the girdle is made up of a small interclavicle placed between a pair of much larger, triangular clavicles. The cleithrum is similarly very large and is unornamented unlike what is seen in taxa like Ectosteorhachis. Even though it lacks ornamentation, the surface of the bone is still rough. The lobes of the pectoral fins make up around half the length of the fin, with this portion being entirely covered by scales along with a much larger scute located near the fin's base. After the lobe, the segmented fin rays on these fins become much longer and thinner distally. The pelvic fins are much smaller than the pectorals and also have a basal scute. The only unpaired fins preserved on the specimen are a few rays from the first dorsal fin along with the anterior-most portion of the second dorsal fin. Both of these are found on either side of the pelvic fins, similar to what is seen in other members of the family. Throughout the body of Palatinichthys, the scale morphology is largely uniform with all scales ranging from rectangular to rhombic in shape. One trait not seen in all of them however, is the presence of a small outgrowth at the back margin of the scale. Scale rows are structured uniformly in having a row of wider median scales on the dorsal side of the body. A row of smaller scales then extends posterolateral from these medial scales.

== Paleoenvironment ==
The Meisenheim Formation, as a whole, represents a freshwater system made up from river deltas that exited into lakes. The flora from this environment along with Palatinichthys most likely did not live in the lakes they were deposited in, instead living within and around the deltas. Based on the floral remains, the edges of the river were most likely filled with a dense and diverse array of plants with Calamites being the most dominant plant. The exact placement of these floral communities are unknown though they most likely made up a number of microhabitats in the region. The presence of more arid adapted plants also potentially show other floral communities (referred to as hinterland floras) that were much further away, with the plants being carried to the main delta through tributaries. Volcanic activity was present through the entire deposition of the formation, as shown by the many layers of tuff found throughout it. Based on the lack of volcanic activity in the basin itself, it is suggested that the volcano depositing this ash was located near where the Central Alps are today which is 350–400 kilometres (220–250 mi) from the basin containing the Meisenheim Formation. Ashfalls caused by highly explosive activity found throughout this region are thought to have been happening at a similar time at they were at Meisenheim. This activity is not only suggested to have caused the tuff layers of the formation but also the presence of charcoal with these coming from the more arid, hinterland floras found further away from the depositional environment. The lakes represented within the Meisenheim Formation were deep and large, with estimates placing their surface area as over 10 square kilometres (3.9 sq mi). The largest group of animals found within these lengths are temnospondyls. These include Glanochthon, multiple species of Sclerocephalus, Apateon, Leptorophus, and Archegosaurus with another large predator found at the formation being the xenacanth Lebachacanthus. Between smaller species and juvenile individuals, temnospondyls were present throughout the levels of the food chain. Outside of these larger predators, a number of groups of smaller fish have been found throughout the formation like those in Paramblypteridae have also been found.
