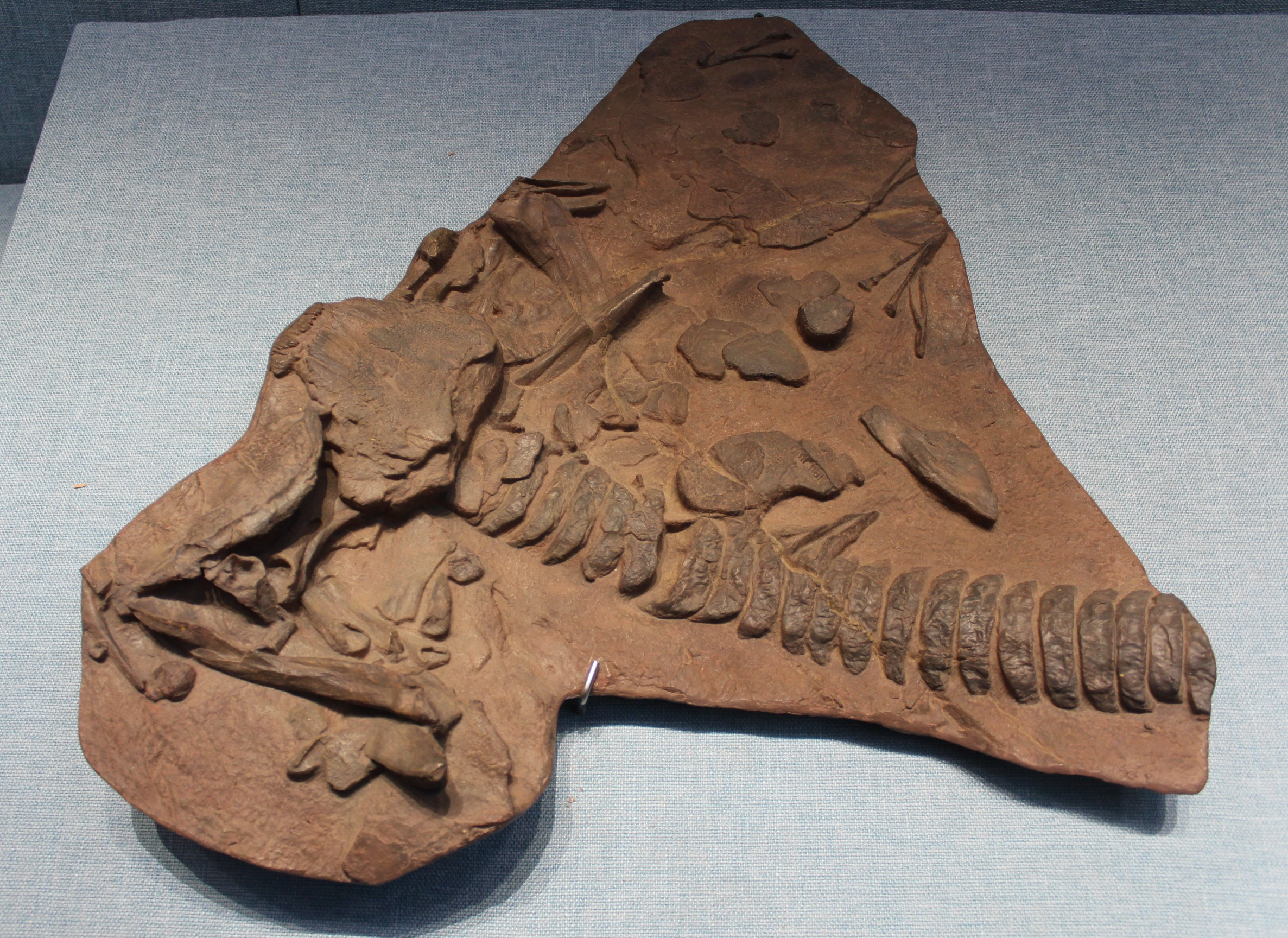
- Fossil specimen at the Baoding Natural History Museum

Scientific classification
- Kingdom: Animalia
- Phylum: Chordata
- Class: †Rhizodontida
- Genus: †Hongyu; Zhu et al., 2017
- Species: †H. chowi

Binomial name
- †Hongyu chowi Zhu et al., 2017

= Hongyu =

Hongyu Temporal range: Famennian 370–360 Ma

Extinct genus of tetrapodomorphs

Hongyu is an extinct genus of rhizodont tetrapodomorph from the late Devonian Zhongning Formation of China. The holotype of the fish is made up of the back of the skull, the first twenty-two centra of the vertebral column, and the shoulder girdle. The skull and shoulder girdle of the fish show features seen in other tetrapodamorphs like elpistostegids, causing the phylogenic placement of the genus to be unknown early on. Currently, however, a number of more recent phylogenic placements including Hongyu place it as the basal most rhizodont. The aberrant anatomy of the fish is suggested to have been due to a more benthic lifestyle than its close relatives. Hongyu lived in a freshwater environment made up of meandering streams surrounded by a woodland. Only one species has been placed within the genus: H. chowi.

== History and naming ==
The holotype of Hongyu (IVPP V17681) was first collected from a quarry in Qingtongxia, China by Per E. Ahlberg and Min Zhu in 2002. After being collected, the material was then put in the collections of the Institute Vertebrate Paleontology and Paleoanthropology in China. The holotype and only known specimen is made up of the back of the skull, an anterior portion of the vertebral column, and the shoulder girdle. The missing parts of the skull have been suggested to be missing due to the quarrying process. This material was later described by Min Zhu and coauthors in 2017 with them noting the mosaic of features usually found in both rhizodonts and later tetrapodomorphs like elpistostegids.

The generic name of Hongyu derives from Chinese and translates to "large fish". The specific name of the taxon is named in honor of Min-Chen Chow.

== Description ==
Hongyu was a large fish, similar to other members of Rhizodonta, with an estimated body length of 1.5 metres (4.9 ft). This is based on the proportions seen in Gooloogongia, a much more complete member of the group.

The skull of the fish is very incomplete, though some more anterior bones of the skull are preserved such as a fragmentary premaxilla, squamosal, and the back of the palatoquadrate. This material is where a majority of the rhizodont features can be seen. Similar to other members of the group, there is contact between the extratemporal and supratemporal bones. Along with this, the tall lamina on the premaxilla, a characteristic mainly seen in rhizodonts, is seen in the material. Based on the shape of the squamosal, the jugal and quadratojugal bones were most likely in contact with one another as is seen in Screbinodus. Unlike other rhizodonts however, Hongyu has a lower jaw that is robust though is very shallow at the back. The hyomandibula also ends at the back of the opercular process and lacks a distal ramus.

The holotype of Hongyu preserves a total of twenty-two vertebrae which all have slender neural arches and ring-shaped centra. The first centrum of the column articulates with the occiput using a pair of processes located at the top of the centrum. However, the most well preserved and notable feature of the fish is the shoulder girdle. Similar to other rhizodonts, the large, robust shoulder girdle of Hongyu has a large clavicular spine. In contrast to this morphology more similar to other rhizodonts, the cleithrum does not cover the scapulocoracoid with a large lamina. This causes the scapulocoracoid to be visible in lateral view, something not usually seen in members of the group. Most of the pectoral fins are not preserved in the specimen but there are two lepidotrichia and a few radial elements which most likely represent the right fin.

== Classification ==
In the original description of the Hongyu, the phylogenic placement of the animal within tetrapodomorphs was questioned due to the mix of anatomical traits. The phylogenies in this paper had two conclusions with the first one placing the genus in a trichotomy which both rhizodonts and elpistostegids–tetrapods. The other analysis placed the genus as an outgroup to rhizodonts, with this second result being closer to our current understanding of the genus. Since the original description, a few phylogenic analyses have included Hongyu such as the 2023 paper Brian Choo and coauthors which placed the genus as the basal-most member of Rhizodontida rather than directly outside of it. Below are both cladograms from the original description paper and 2023 paper by Choo and coauthors:

Zhu et al. (2017)

- - - - Youngolepis
      - Diabolepis
    - - - Powichthys
        - - Porolepis
          - Glyptolepis
      - - Medoevia
        - - - Osteolepis
            - Gogonasus
        - - Cladarosymblema
          - Ectosteorhachis
          - Megalichthys
        - - - Beelarongia
            - - Canowindra
              - Koharalepis
        - - Gyroptychius
        - - Tristichopteridae
      - - Rhizodontida
        - Hongyu
        - - Panderichthys
          - - Elpistostege
            - Tiktaalik
            - - Acanthostega
              - Ichthyostega

Zhu et al. (2017)

- - - Youngolepis
    - Diabolepis
    - - - Powichthys
        - - Porolepis
          - Glyptolepis
      - - Tungsenia
        - Kenichthys
        - - - Rhizodontida
            - Hongyu
          - - - Medoevia
              - - - Osteolepis
                  - Gogonasus
              - - Cladarosymblema
                - Ectosteorhachis
                - Megalichthys
            - - - Beelarongia
                - - Canowindra
                  - Koharalepis
              - - Tristichopteridae
                - - Panderichthys
                  - - Elpistostege
                    - Tiktaalik
                    - - Acanthostega
                      - Ichthyostega

Choo et al. (2023)

- - Tungsenia paradoxa
  - - Kenichthys campbelli
    - - - Honyu chowi
        - - Gooloogongia loomesi
          - - Barameda spp.
            - - Sauripterus taylori
              - - Rhizodus spp.
                - Strepsodus sauriodes
              - Letognathus hardingi
      - - - Harajicadectes zhumini
          - - Gyroptychius agassizi
            - Osteolepis macrolepidotus
            - - Medoevia lata
              - - - Cladarosymblema narrienense
                  - Ectosteorhachis nitidus
                  - Megalichthys hibberti
                - - Beelarongia patrichae
                  - - Canowindra grossi
                    - Koharalepis jarviki
        - Mardenichthys longioccipitus
        - - Spodichthys buetleri
          - - Tristichopterus alatus
            - - Eusthenopteron foordi
              - - Jarvikina wenjukowi
                - - Carbonichthys burnsi
                  - - Platycephalichthys spp.
                    - - Manadgeria fairfaxi
                      - Eusthenodon wangsjoi
                  - - Tinirau clackae
                    - - Bruehnopteron murphyi
                      - - Panderichthys rhombolepis
                        - - Elpistostege watsoni
                          - - Tiktaalik roseae
                            - - Ventastega curonica
                              - - Acanthostega gunnari
                                - - Ichthyostega stensioei
                                  - Tulerpeton curtum

== Paleobiology ==
The strange anatomy seen in the skull and shoulder girdle of Hongyu has been suggested to be the result of a more benthic lifestyle than other rhizodonts. The original description by Zhu and coauthors puts forward that the fish could have used a mix of moving the head upwards and rapidly opening the mouth to catch fish as have been suggested for the temnospondyl Gerrothorax.

=== Paleoenvironment ===
The strata of the Zhongning Formation represent what was once a freshwater ecosystem made up of meandering streams, like a number of other Middle to Late Devonian red beds. The progymnosperm tree Archaeopteris macilenta made up woodlands that surrounded the bodies of water. Based on the plant material found, these trees have been estimated to reach a maximum height of 7.2 metres (24 ft). Outside of these woodlands, there is also evidence of wetlands and more arid desert shrublands. These more forested areas would have had a subhumid climate with annual precipitation ranging between 504–896 millimetres (19.8–35.3 in) depending on the palaeosol used. These streams would have also been home to a number of antiarch placoderms and Sinostega, a much smaller tetrapodamorph.
