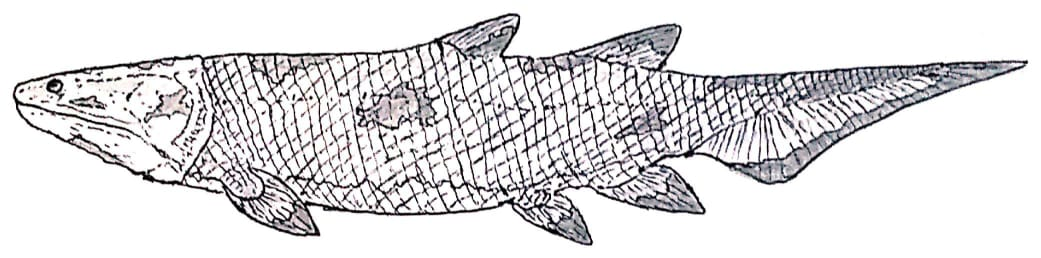
- Tungsenia paradoxa

Scientific classification
- Kingdom: Animalia
- Phylum: Chordata
- Clade: Tetrapodomorpha
- Genus: †Tungsenia; Lu et al., 2012

Type species
- †Tungsenia paradoxa Lu et al., 2012

= Tungsenia =

Tungsenia Temporal range: Early Devonian, 409 Ma

Extinct genus of tetrapodomorphs

Tungsenia is an extinct genus of lobe-finned fish known from the early Devonian Posongchong Formation of Yunnan, South China. It is the earliest and most basal tetrapodomorph known, having a mixture of traits of tetrapodomorphs and basal dipnomorphs. This not only is present in the skull itself but also in the brain which has features much more similar to dipnomorphs than to other early tetrapodomorphs. Due to this, along with a more derived mandible, it is likely that the jaw of tetrapodomorphs evolved earlier than other parts of the head. There is only one species of the genus known; T. paradoxa.

== History and naming ==
The holotype of Tungsenia (IVPP V10687), along with four referred specimens, was discovered in yellow sandstone layer of the Posongchong Formation in northeastern Yunnan, South China. The description of the genus was not the first time that the material was referenced in the literature. In 1996, Janqing Wang and coauthors described what would later become the holotype along with the lower jaws as a indeterminate member of the family Osteolepidae. This original collection of five specimens were described in 2012 by Jing Lu and coauthors with it being placed as the earliest stem tetrapod in the fossil record. The age of the fossils have been brought up to push the tetrapod fossil record closer to estimated age in which tetrapods and lungfish split off from one another. More material assigned to the genus was later found during fieldwork from the same locality as the previously between the years 2011-2015, with this yielding the postparietal shield of the animal. This new specimen was later described by Jing Lu and coauthors in 2019.

The generic name, Tungsenia, is in honor of the paleoichthyologist Liu Tungsen. The species name "paradoxa" is in reference to the unexpected nature of the animal.

== Description ==
Due to its more basal position among tetrapodamorphs, the anatomy of Tungsenia has similarities to not only other members of the clade but also to basal dipnomorphs. The snout of the fish is slightly upturned similar to dipnomorphs like Youngolepis. Also similar to the early member of both of these groups, infraorbital sensory canal runs along the regions of the premaxillary would have been sutured to other bones. The parasphenoid of the fish is both long and wide paired internasal pits resemble early dipnomorphs more than other stem-tetrapods. Towards the back of the snout, the fish possesses a well-developed basipterygoid. Similar to a couple of other stem-tetrapods, Tungsenia has a recess positioned anterodorsal to the optic foramen which is believed to be correlated to eye muscles. Along with these muscles, the eyes of the fish are generally large with the orbital notch making up around 40% of the total length of the parietal shield. Though it has a number of features more similar to dipnomorphs, the fish also possessed features exclusive to stem-tetrapods including fangs on the parasymphysial plate. These fangs, however are mainly seen in stem-tetrapods with limbs rather than those with fins, showing that they evolved multiple times. The cheek bone of Tungsenia is made up the preopercular, quadratojugal, and squamosal bones which have been fused together. This is a feature not only seen in some other stem tetrapods but also Youngolepis. The back of the skull is also has features seen in both groups, similar to the snout. While the fish has a median dorsal aorta with a lateral dorsal aortae coming out of it like tetrapodomorphs, the otoccipital anatomy is more similar to what is seen in Youngolepis. One feature that differentiates it from both basal dipnomorphs and more derived tetrapodomorphs is its large, stout basicranial fenestra. The lower jaw of the fish was deep and short.

Similar to the skull, the brain of Tungsenia also shows a strange combination of features. While the cerebral cavity has been expanded similar to what is seen in other stem tetrapods, a majority of the other notable features of the brain more closely resemble basal dipnomorphs. Like in this other group of fish, the parapineal and pineal organs are placed adjacent to one another. Along with this, the anatomy of and around the hypophysial fossa much more closely resemble taxa such as Powichthys and Glyptolepis.

== Classification ==
Since the initial description of the fish, Tungsenia has been placed as the basal-most and earliest known stem tetrapod in the fossil record. This is not only supported by features of the mandible and basipterygoid process but also features of endocranium that bridges the gap between those seen in lungfish and tetrapods. These features also show that changes in the mandible of the earliest stem-tetrapods happened faster than in the endocranium. This position held stable with the description of the new material in 2019 with Tungsenia being the outgroup to all other tetrapodomorpha. Papers not focused on the genus, such as the 2023 publication by Brian Choo and coauthors, also place the fish the outgroup to the rest of the clade. Below are the phylogenic trees from the publications mentioned:

Lu et al. (2012)

- - Tungsenia
  - - Kenichthys
    - - - Gooloogongia
        - Barameda
      - - - Gogonasus
          - Osteolepis
          - - Gyroptychius
          - - - Medoevia
              - - Megalichthys
                - Cladarosymblema
        - - - Canowindra
            - Koharalepis
            - Beelarongia
          - - Marsdenichthys
            - - Spodichthys
              - - Eusthenopteron
                - - Tristichopterus
                  - - Panderichthys
                    - - Tiktaalik
                      - - Ichthyostega
                        - Acanthostega
                        - Tetrapoda

Lu et al. (2019)

- - Tungsenia
  - - Kenichthys
    - - - Osteolepis
        - - - Gyroptchius
            - - - Gogonasus
                - Medoevia
              - - - Cladarosymblema
                  - Megalichthys
          - - - Beelarongia
              - - Koharalepis
                - Canowindra
            - - Marsdenichthys
              - - - Spodichthys
                  - - Tristichopterus
                    - Eusthenopteron
                - - Panderichthys
                  - - Tiktaalik
                    - - Acanthostega
                      - Ichthyostega
      - - Gooloogongia
        - Barameda

Choo et al. (2023)

- - Tungsenia paradoxa
  - - Kenichthys campbelli
    - - - Hongyu chowi
        - - Gooloogongia loomesi
          - - Barameda spp.
            - - Sauripterus taylori
              - - Rhizodus spp.
                - Strepsodus sauriodes
              - Letognathus hardingi
      - - - Harajicadectes zhumini
          - - Gyroptychius agassizi
            - Osteolepis macrolepidotus
            - - Medoevia lata
              - - - Cladarosymblema narrienense
                  - Ectosteorhachis nitidus
                  - Megalichthys hibberti
                - - Beelarongia patrichae
                  - - Canowindra grossi
                    - Koharalepis jarviki
        - Mardenichthys longioccipitus
        - - Spodichthys buetleri
          - - Tristichopterus alatus
            - - Eusthenopteron foordi
              - - Jarvikina wenjukowi
                - - Carbonichthys burnsi
                  - - Platycephalichthys spp.
                    - - Manadgeria fairfaxi
                      - Eusthenodon wangsjoi
                  - - Tinirau clackae
                    - - Bruehnopteron murphyi
                      - - Panderichthys rhombolepis
                        - - Elpistostege watsoni
                          - - Tiktaalik roseae
                            - - Ventastega curonica
                              - - Acanthostega gunnari
                                - - Ichthyostega stensioei
                                  - Tulerpeton curtum

== Paleoenvironment ==
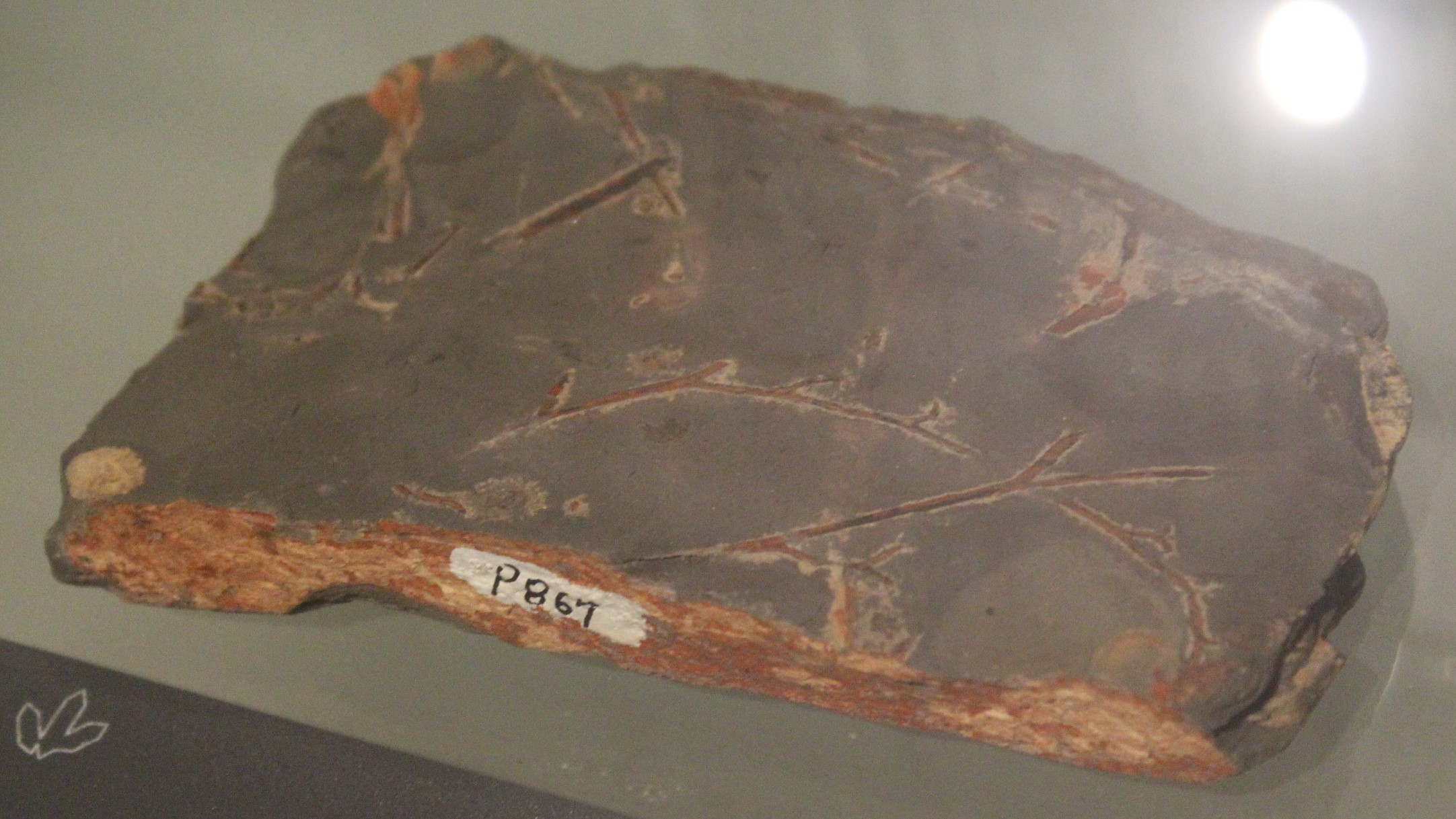
Eophyllophyton, one of the many plants known from the formation.

The paleoenvironment of the Posongchong Formation has been well studied due to the presence of a very diverse assemblage of early plants. Overall, the ecosystem preserved in the sediments is coastal with channel deposits showing some sort of fluvial bodies of water were in the region. A number of plant species such as Eophyllophyton and Oricilla would have grown on the edges of these channels, most likely being transported into the marine environments by floods. These coasts would have most likely on an estuary, with some of the plants also being suggested to have come from marsh communities further inland. The neighboring more aquatic ecosystem would have been in shallow, brackish waters with a similar faunal composition to other early Devonian biotas in China. This being a high diversity in the jawless fish group Galeaspida along with early Placoderms along with lobe-finned fish.
