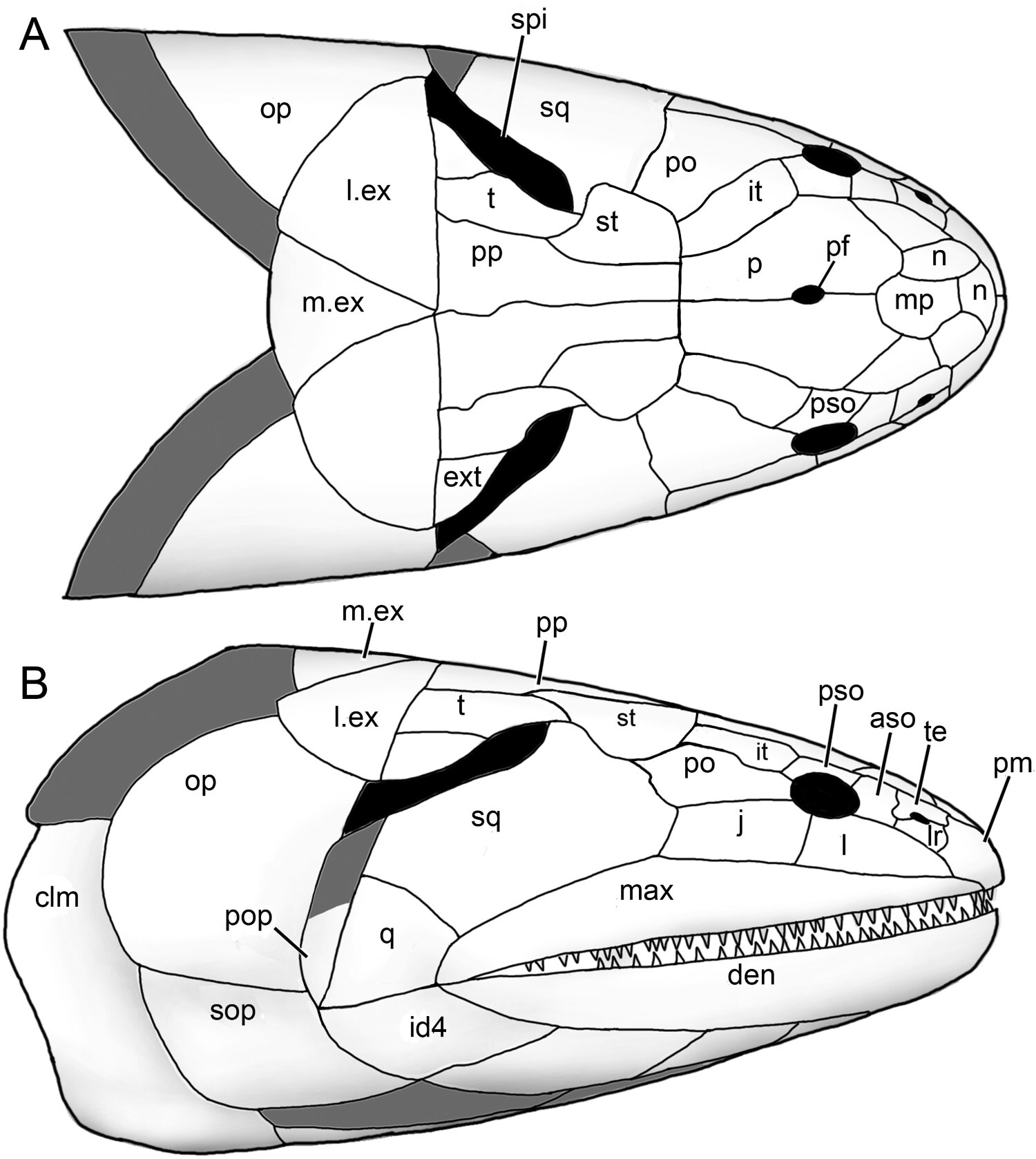
- Reconstructed skull and pectoral girdle of Harajicadectes zhumini

Scientific classification
- Kingdom: Animalia
- Phylum: Chordata
- Clade: Sarcopterygii
- Clade: Rhipidistia
- Clade: Tetrapodomorpha
- Genus: †Harajicadectes; Choo et al., 2024
- Species: †H. zhumini

Binomial name
- †Harajicadectes zhumini Choo et al., 2024

= Harajicadectes =

Harajicadectes Temporal range: Givetian to Frasnian, 387.7–372.2 Ma

Genus of stem-tetrapod from the Middle–Late Devonian

Harajicadectes (/ˌhærəˌdʒiːkəˈdɛktiːz/, meaning "Harajica biter") is a genus of stem-tetrapod from the Givetian to Frasnian Amadeus Basin in Northern Territory, Australia. The type and only species is Harajicadectes zhumini, known from 13 specimens of various preservation quality.

== Etymology ==
The generic name, Harajicadectes, is derived from the geologic member the specimens were found in, the Harajica Sandstone Member, and the Greek 'dēktēs', which translates to 'biter'. The specific name, zhumini, honours Prof. Min Zhu of the Institute of Vertebrate Paleontology and Paleoanthropology, Beijing, China, for his numerous contributions to early vertebrate paleontology.

== Description ==
Choo et al. (2024) assigned a holotype and paratype to Harajicadectes, NTM P6410 and CPC 39948, respectively. The holotype consists of a partial skull and much of the body outline in dorsal view with squamation preserved. The paratype consists of a partial skull, the right post-temporal, and the right lower jaw.

== Classification ==
Choo et al. (2024) recovered Harajicadectes as a stem-tetrapod in their phylogenetic analyses. They reconstructed two trees collated from 336 most parsimonious trees. The first tree is a strict consensus tree, the numbers represent Bremer support values. The second tree is a 50% majority-rule consensus tree, the numbers are node support bootstrap values. Their results are reproduced below:

Topology A: strict consensus tree

- Tetrapodomorpha
  - Tungsenia paradoxa
  - - Kenichthys campbelli
    - - Rhizodontida
      - - Gyroptychius agassizi
        - Osteolepis macrolepidotus
        - Gogonasus andrewsae
        - - Cladarosymblema narienense
          - Ectosteorhachis nitidus
          - Megalichthys hibberti
        - Medoevia lata
        - - Beelarongia patrichae
          - - Canowindra grossi
            - Koharalepis jarviki
        - Harajicadectes zhumini
        - Marsdenichthys longioccipitus
        - Eotetrapodiformes

Topology B: 50% majority-rule consensus tree

- Tetrapodomorpha
  - Tungsenia paradoxa
  - - Kenichthys campbelli
    - - Rhizodontida
      - - "Osteolepididae"
          - Harajicadectes zhumini
          - - Gyroptychius agassizi
            - Osteolepis macrolepidotus
            - - Medoevia lata
              - - Gogonasus andrewsae
                - - Cladarosymblema narienense
                  - Ectosteorhachis nitidus
                  - Megalichthys hibberti
                - - Beelarongia patrichae
                  - Canowindra grossi
                  - Koharalepis jarviki
        - Marsdenichthys longioccipitus
        - Eotetrapodiformes
