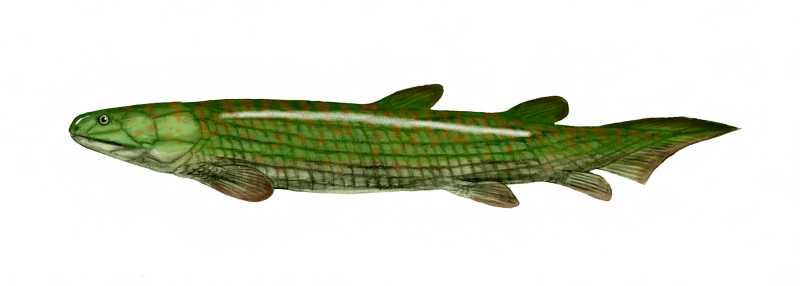
- Osteolepis

Scientific classification
- Kingdom: Animalia
- Phylum: Chordata
- Clade: Rhipidistia
- Clade: Tetrapodomorpha
- Class: †Osteolepidida
- Order: †Osteolepiformes; Berg, 1937

Groups included
- See text

Cladistically included but traditionally excluded taxa
- Elpistostegalia

= Osteolepiformes =

Osteolepiformes Temporal range: 396–299 Ma Middle Devonian to Late Carboniferous

Paraphyletic group of tetrapodomorphs

Osteolepiformes, also known as Osteolepidida, is a group of prehistoric lobe-finned fishes which first appeared during the Devonian period. The order contains the families Canowindridae, Megalichthyidae, Osteolepididae and Tristichopteridae, in addition to several monotypic families. The order is generally considered to be paraphyletic because the characters that define it are mainly attributes of stem tetrapodomorphs.

The following taxonomy is based on Borgen & Nakrem, 2016:

- Order †Osteolepiformes
  - Suborder †Osteolepidoidei
    - Family †Osteolepididae
    - Family †Thursiidae
    - Family †Megalichthyidae
  - Suborder †Cyclolepidoidei
    - Superfamily †Eopodoidea
      - Family †Chrysolepididae
      - Family †Gyroptychiidae
      - Family Panderichthyidae (incl. Elpistostegalia)
      - Family †Tristichopteridae
    - Superfamily †Parapodoidea
      - Family †Canowindridae
      - Family †Medoevididae
    - Superfamily †Rhizodontoidea

Below is a cladogram showing the paraphyly of Osteolepiformes compiled and modified from Ahlberg and Johanson (1998). See also Swartz (2012). Osteolepiformes is marked by the green bracket.

- Tetrapodomorpha
  - Kenichthys
  - - Rhizodontida
      - Barameda
      - Gooloogongia
    - - - Gogonasus
        - Osteolepis
      - - - - Megalichthys
            - Cladarosymblema
          - Ectosteorhachis
        - - Medoevia
          - - - - Koharalepis
                - Canowindra
              - Beelarongia
            - - Gyroptychius
              - - Tristichopteridae
                  - - - - - Eusthenodon
                          - Mandageria
                        - Cabonnichthys
                      - Platycephalichthys
                    - Jarvikina
                  - Eusthenopteron
                  - Tristichopterus
                - - Panderichthys
                  - Tetrapoda
                    - Acanthostega
                    - Ichthyostega
