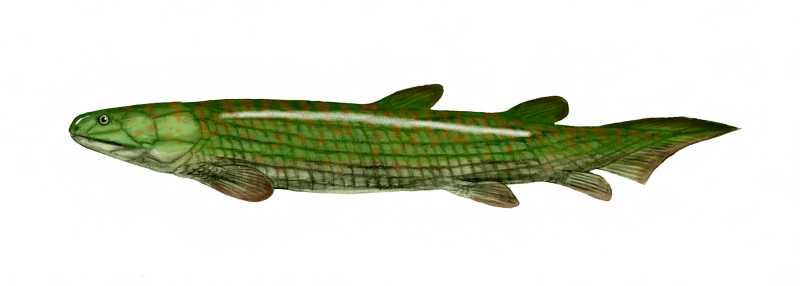
- Life restoration of Osteolepis

Scientific classification
- Kingdom: Animalia
- Phylum: Chordata
- Class: †Osteolepidida
- Order: †Osteolepiformes
- Family: †Osteolepididae; Cope, 1889

Genera
- See text

= Osteolepididae =

Osteolepididae Temporal range: Devonian

Paraphyletic family of tetrapodomorphs

Osteolepididae is a family of primitive, fish-like tetrapodomorphs (the clade that contains modern tetrapods and their extinct relatives) that lived during the Devonian period. The family is generally thought to be paraphyletic, with the traits that characterise the family being widely distributed among basal tetrapodomorphs and other osteichthyans. Some of the genera historically placed in Osteolepididae have more recently been assigned to the family Megalichthyidae, which appears to be a monophyletic group.

== Genera ==
Below is a list of genera regarded as osteolepidids at some point:

- †Chrysolepis (Reassigned to the monotypic family Chrysolepididae)
- †Ectosteorhachis (Reassigned to the family Megalichthyidae)
- †Geptolepis
- †Glyptopomus
- †Gogonasus
- †Greiserolepis
- †Gyroptychius
- †"Diplopterus" (Junior homonym; reassigned to the family Tristichopteridae and renamed to Heddleichthys)
- †Kenichthys
- †Latvius
- †Medoevia (Reassigned to the monotypic family Medoevididae)
- †Megalichthys (Reassigned to the family Megalichthyidae)
- †Megapomus
- †Megistolepis
- †Muranjilepis
- †Osteolepis
- †Peregrina
- †Shirolepis
- †Thursius (Reassigned to the monotypic family Thursiidae)
