= Latvius =

Latvius Temporal range: Late Devonian (Frasnian)

Scientific classification
- Kingdom: Animalia
- Phylum: Chordata
- Class: †Osteolepidida
- Order: †Osteolepiformes
- Family: †Osteolepididae
- Genus: †Latvius; Jarvik, 1948

Type species
- †Osteolepis grewingki Gross, 1933

Species
- L. deckerti Jessen, 1966; L. grewingki (Gross, 1933); ?L. niger Jessen, 1973

Extinct genus of fishes

Latvius is an extinct genus of prehistoric marine osteolepid lobe-finned fish known from the Late Devonian of Europe.

The following species are known:

- L. deckerti Jessen, 1966 - Frasnian of Germany (Bergisch Gladbach Formation)
- L. grewingki (Gross, 1933) (type species) - Frasnian of Latvia (Kokenhusen Marl of Snetnaya Formation) (=Osteolepis grewingki Gross, 1933)
- L. niger Jessen, 1973 - Frasnian of Germany (Bergisch Gladbach Formation) (potentially conspecific with L. deckerti)

The species L. porosus Greiner, 1977 was described from the Albert Formation of New Brunswick, Canada, but later studies have found it to potentially be a megalichthyid lobe-finned fish instead, and thus deserving of a new genus name. Another species described from Leningrad Oblast, Russia, L. obrutus Vorobyeva, 1977 has been found to not represent a osteolepid, but rather a primitive tetrapod, although later studies have found it to be a lungfish.

It appears to be closely related to Gogonasus, a osteolepid from the Devonian of Australia.

== See also ==
- Sarcopterygii
- List of sarcopterygians
- List of prehistoric bony fish
