= Litoptychus =

Litoptychus Temporal range: Late Devonian (Frasnian)

Scientific classification
- Kingdom: Animalia
- Phylum: Chordata
- Clade: Tetrapodomorpha
- Clade: †Megalichthyiformes
- Genus: †Litoptychus; Denison, 1951
- Species: †L. bryanti

Binomial name
- †Litoptychus bryanti Denison, 1951

Extinct genus of tetrapodomorphs

Litoptychus is an extinct genus of prehistoric marine tetrapodomorph lobe-finned fish from the Late Devonian of North America. It contains a single species, L. bryanti from the Frasnian-aged Elbert Formation of Colorado, US, where it is known from several partial skull remains and scales. Some rounded scales previously assigned to this genus are now thought to belong to lungfish instead.

Originally described in the Osteolepididae, later studies have identified it as an early-diverging member of a clade containing the Megalichthyidae and Osteolepididae, which was described as the Megalichthyiformes. Specifically, Litoptychus was identified as sister to a clade containing the Megalichthyidae and the tetrapodomorph Rhizodopsis.
