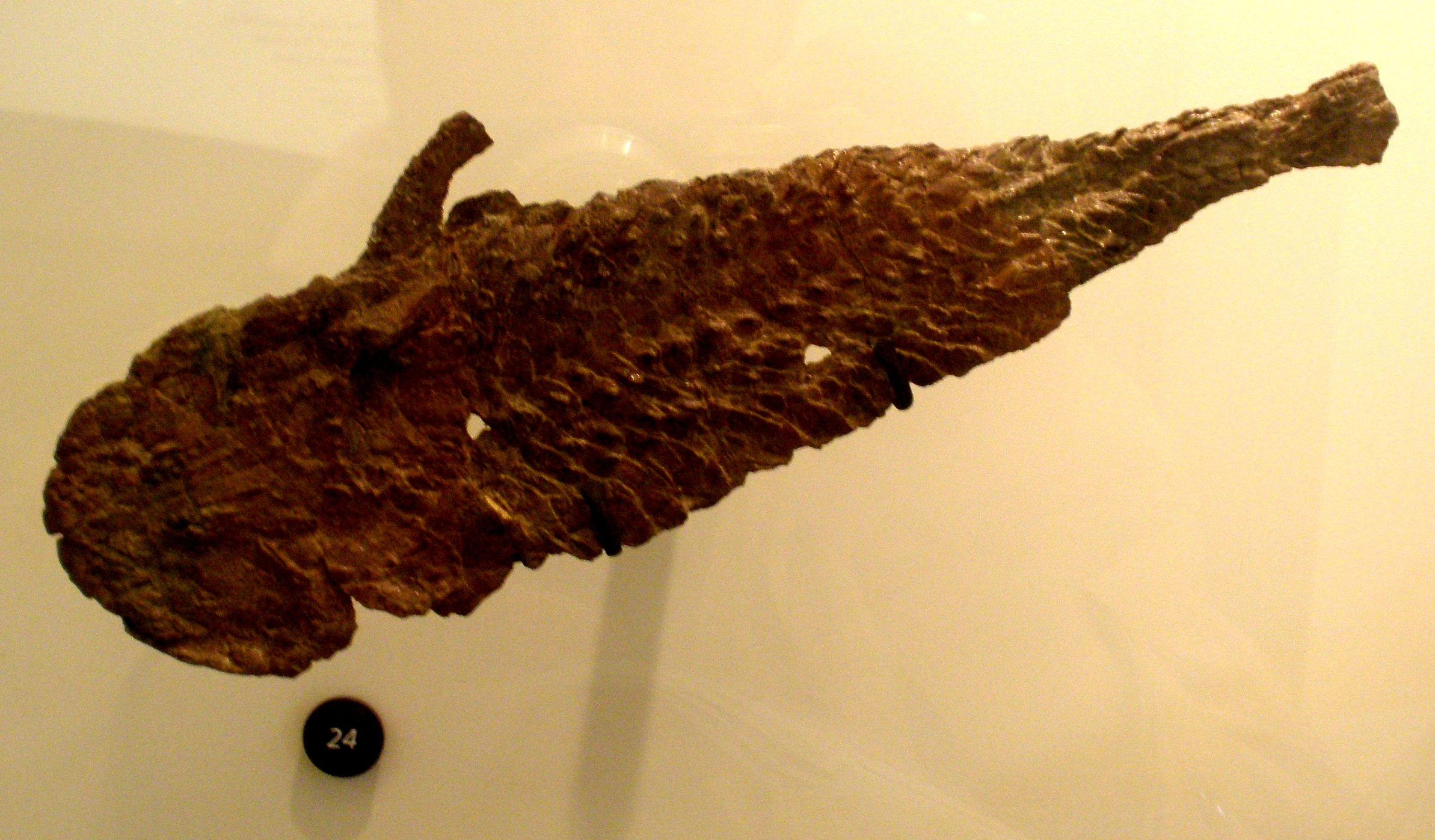
- Fossil of Ectosteorhachis

Scientific classification
- Kingdom: Animalia
- Phylum: Chordata
- Clade: †Megalichthyiformes
- Family: †Megalichthyidae; Hay, 1902

Genera
- †Askerichthys Borgen & Nakrem, 2016; †Cladarosymblema Fox et al., 1995; †Cryptolepis? Vorobyeva, 1975; †Ectosteorhachis Cope, 1880; †Lohsania? Thomson & Vaughn, 1968; †Mahalalepis? Young et al., 1992; †Megalichthys Agassiz, 1835 (Type); †Megapomus? Vorobyeva, 1977; †Megistolepis? Vorobyeva, 1977; †Palatinichthys Witzmann & Schoch, 2012; †Rhizodopsis? Young, 1866; †Sengoerichthys Janvier et al., 2007; †Sterropterygion? Thomson, 1972

= Megalichthyidae =

Megalichthyidae Temporal range: Late Devonian–Early Permian Possible Middle Devonian record

Extinct family of tetrapodomorphs

Megalichthyidae is an extinct family of tetrapodomorphs which lived from the Middle–Late Devonian to the Early Permian. They are known primarily from freshwater deposits, mostly in the Northern Hemisphere (Europe, the Middle East, North Africa and North America), but one genus (Cladarosymblema) is known from Australia, and the possible megalichthyid Mahalalepis is from Antarctica.

== Description ==
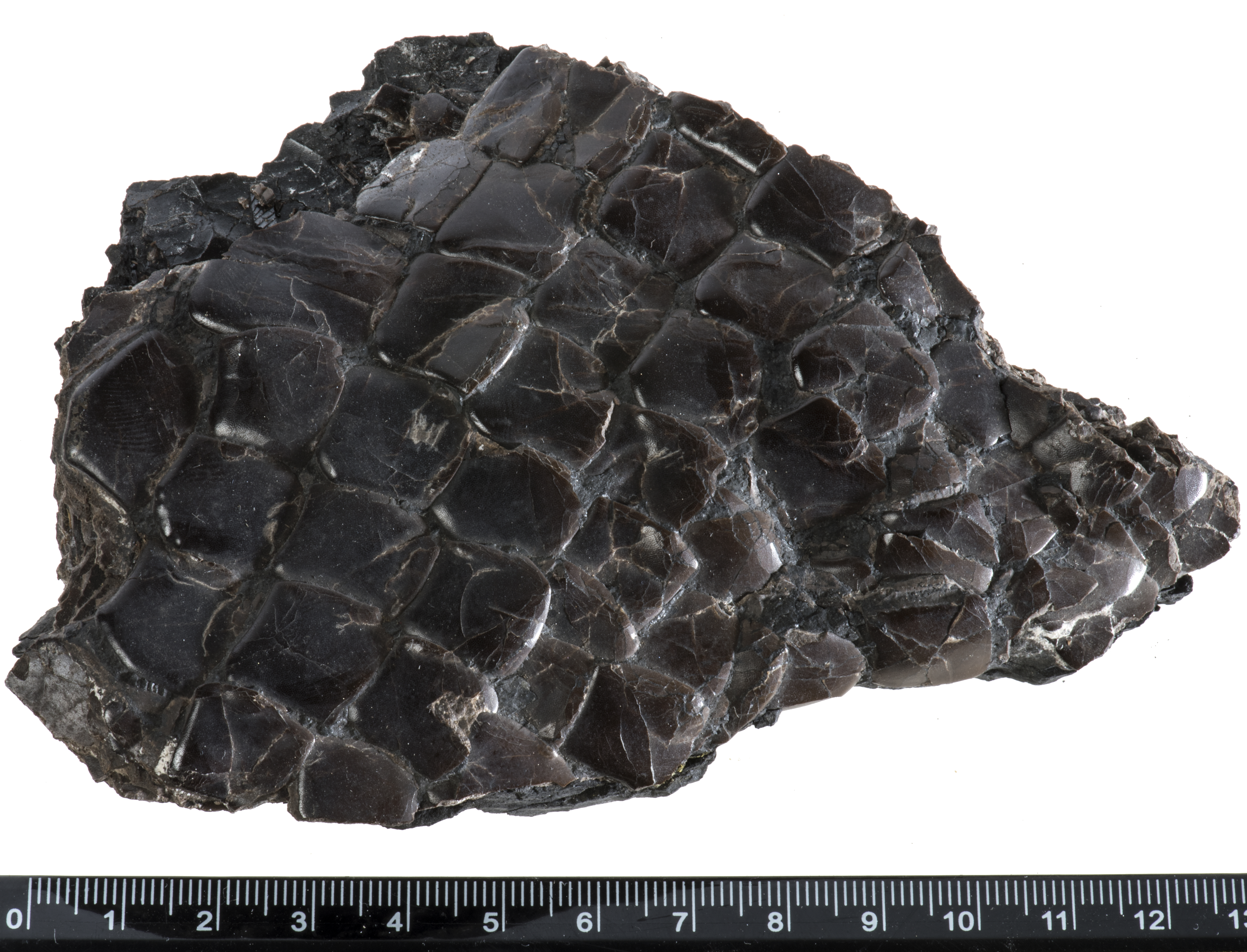
Fossilised scales of Megalichthys hibberti

Megalichthyids were fairly primitive tetrapodomorphs, retaining a largely fish-like appearance. Like some other primitive sarcopterygians, their bodies were covered in rhomboid scales that possessed a layer of cosmine (a porous, mineralised tissue). The scales however lacked the peg-and-socket articulations found in some other groups.

The skulls of megalichthyids had a rather low and broad shape. Like the scales, the dermal bones of the skull bore a layer of cosmine. The nostrils were somewhat elongated, slit-like holes that were bordered in the front by the lateral rostral bone and in the back by the posterior tectal bone. The premaxilla (one of the bones of the upper jaw) had a well-developed posterior process, and bore a large tusk that either interrupted the main tooth row or was located further inside the mouth, depending on the species. The maxilla (another bone of the upper jaw, located behind the premaxilla) was rather tall, especially towards the rear end. The vomers (a pair of bones in the palate) were short and broad, with a well-developed mesial process in some cases. The lacrimal bone had a prominent notch. The front end of the parietal bone had a concave shape where it contacted the posterior nasal bone. The pineal foramen (a hole located at the top of the skull in some vertebrates, containing the parietal eye) was absent. The supratemporal bone had a forwards-pointing process that lacked a covering of cosmine. The squamosal bone was nearly equal in height and width. The preopercular was a fairly short, vertically aligned bone. The opercular series (a set of bones protecting the gills) consisted of three bones, the opercular and two suboperculars. The opercular was large and almost square-shaped. The suboperculars were in contact with the last or second-last of the submandibular bones (a group of bones lying beneath the dentary bone of the lower jaw). The pectoral fins were large and had a fan-like shape.

== Classification ==
Megalichthys, the type genus of Megalichthyidae, was historically grouped together with various other primitive tetrapodomorphs into the family Osteolepididae, starting with an 1891 article by the English palaeontologist Arthur Smith Woodward. Osteolepididae is nowadays thought to be paraphyletic, being diagnosed mainly by features that are widely distributed among tetrapodomorphs and other osteichthyans.

The family Megalichthyidae was erected in 1902 by the American palaeontologist Oliver Perry Hay. Within the family, he included the genera Coelosteus, Eusthenopteron, Megalichthys, Rabdiolepis, Rhizodopsis, Sauripteris and Strepsodus, most of which are no longer regarded as megalichthyids. The family thereafter went into disuse for a long time, but was treated as a subfamily of Osteolepididae (as Megalichthyinae) by Vorobyeva (1977). Megalichthyidae was resurrected as a separate family in a 1992 article by Young et al., who assigned Megalichthys, Ectosteorhachis, Megistolepis and the newly described Mahalalepis to the group. Later studies have disagreed about which genera should be included, but it is widely agreed that at least Megalichthys, Ectosteorhachis and Cladarosymblema belong to Megalichthyidae.

A few genera of "osteolepidids" (e.g. Osteolepis and Gogonasus) have often been recovered in a clade with the megalichthyids. This larger clade was given the name Megalichthyiformes in a 2010 article, and is defined as "including all tetrapodomorph sarcopterygians more closely related to Megalichthys than Eusthenopteron".

Below is a cladogram adapted from a phylogenetic analysis by Clement et al. (2021). Here, the family Canowindridae was found to be the sister group of Megalichthyidae, while four "osteolepidid" genera form a basal grade leading to both groups.

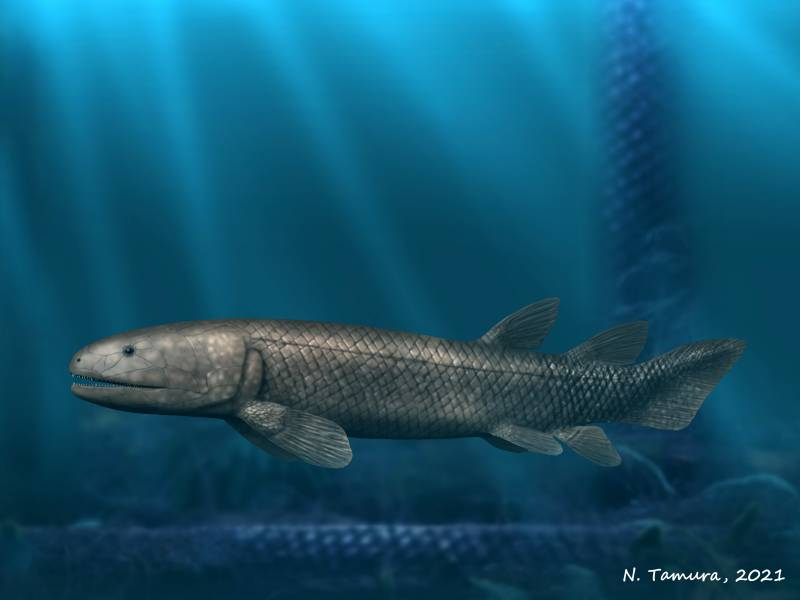
Life restoration of Megalichthys hibberti

- - Gyroptychius
  - Osteolepis
  - - Gogonasus
    - Medoevia
    - - Canowindridae
        - Beelarongia
        - - Canowindra
          - Koharalepis
      - Megalichthyidae
        - Palatinichthys
        - - Megalichthys hibberti
          - - Ectosteorhachis
            - - Cladarosymblema
              - Megalichthys laticeps
              - Megalichthys mullisoni
              - Sengoerichthys
              - - Askerichthys
                - Mahalalepis

== Distribution ==
Fossils attributed to megalichthyids have been found mainly in freshwater deposits, dating to between the Middle–Late Devonian and the Early Permian. North American representatives of the family include Ectosteorhachis, Megalichthys, and the possible megalichthyids Lohsania, Rhizodopsis and Sterropterygion. European megalichthyids include Askerichthys, Megalichthys, Palatinichthys, and the possible members Cryptolepis, Megistolepis, Megapomus and Rhizodopsis. Megalichthyids are also known from Morocco (Megalichthys), Turkey (Sengoerichthys), Australia (Cladarosymblema) and Antarctica (Mahalalepis).
