= Glyptopomus =

Glyptopomus Temporal range: Famennian

Scientific classification
- Kingdom: Animalia
- Phylum: Chordata
- Class: †Osteolepidida
- Order: †Osteolepiformes
- Family: †Osteolepididae
- Subfamily: †Glyptopominae
- Genus: †Glyptopomus; Agassiz, 1844

Type species
- †Glyptopomus minor Agassiz, 1844

Species
- See text

Extinct genus of tetrapodomorphs

Glyptopomus is an extinct genus of prehistoric freshwater sarcopterygian or lobe-finned fish, known from the Late Devonian of Europe and potentially eastern North America. It is considered an early tetrapodomorph in the Osteolepiformes.

The following species are known:

- †G. bystrowi (Gross, 1941) - Famennian of Latvia (Ketleri Formation) and Oryol Oblast, Russia (=Panderichthys bystrowi Gross, 1941)
- †G. elginensis Jarvik, 1950 - Famennian of Scotland (Rosebrae Beds of the Old Red Sandstone)
- †G. kinnairdi (Huxley, 1859) - Famennian of Scotland (Old Red Sandstone)
- †G. minor Agassiz, 1844 (type species) - Famennian of Scotland (Old Red Sandstone)
- †G. sayrei Newberry, 1878 - Famennian of Pennsylvania, US (Catskill Formation)
