= Mahalalepis =

Mahalalepis Temporal range: Devonian

Scientific classification
- Kingdom: Animalia
- Phylum: Chordata
- Clade: †Megalichthyiformes
- Family: †Megalichthyidae
- Genus: †Mahalalepis; Young et al., 1992
- Species: †M. resima

Binomial name
- †Mahalalepis resima Young et al., 1992

Extinct genus of tetrapodomorphs

Mahalalepis is an extinct genus of megalichthyid tetrapodomorphs which lived during the Devonian period.
