= Cryptolepis =

Cryptolepis may refer to:

- Cryptolepis (fish), an extinct fish genus from the Devonian
- Cryptolepis (plant), a plant genus
