= Chrysolepis orlensis =

Chrysolepis Temporal range: Middle Famennian

Scientific classification
- Domain: Eukaryota
- Kingdom: Animalia
- Phylum: Chordata
- Clade: Sarcopterygii
- Clade: Tetrapodomorpha
- Order: †Osteolepiformes
- Family: †Chrysolepididae; Borgen & Nakrem, 2016
- Genus: †Chrysolepis; Lebedev, 1983
- Species: †C. orlensis

Binomial name
- †Chrysolepis orlensis Lebedev, 1983

Extinct genus of tetrapodomorphs

Chrysolepis is a genus of prehistoric marine lobe-finned fish that lived during the Late Devonian period. It contains a single species, C. orlensis, known from the middle Famennian of Oryol Oblast, Russia. It is the only member of the family Chrysolepididae, erected due to its highly distinct morphology unseen among other osteolepiforms. It may be the sister taxon to the eusthenopterids.
