= Cryptolepis grossi =

Cryptolepis grossi Temporal range: Middle to Late Famennian

Scientific classification
- Kingdom: Animalia
- Phylum: Chordata
- Class: †Osteolepidida
- Order: †Osteolepiformes
- Genus: †Cryptolepis; Vorobyeva, 1975
- Species: †C. grossi

Binomial name
- †Cryptolepis grossi Vorobyeva, 1975

Extinct genus of tetrapodomorphs

Cryptolepis is an extinct genus of prehistoric marine lobe-finned fish known from the Late Devonian of what is now eastern Europe. It contains a single species, C. grossi from the middle to late Famennian of Oryol, Russia and Latvia. Scales of this species are particularly common in Devonian localities of Latvia. It was named after paleontologist Walter R. Gross.

It was previously placed in the family Megalichthyidae, but is presently considered an indeterminate "osteolepiform".
