= Megistolepis =

Megistolepis Temporal range: Carboniferous

Scientific classification
- Domain: Eukaryota
- Kingdom: Animalia
- Phylum: Chordata
- Clade: Sarcopterygii
- Clade: Tetrapodomorpha
- Family: †Megalichthyidae
- Genus: †Megistolepis; Obruchev, 1955

Extinct genus of fishes

Megistolepis is a genus of prehistoric lobe-finned fish which lived during the Carboniferous period.
