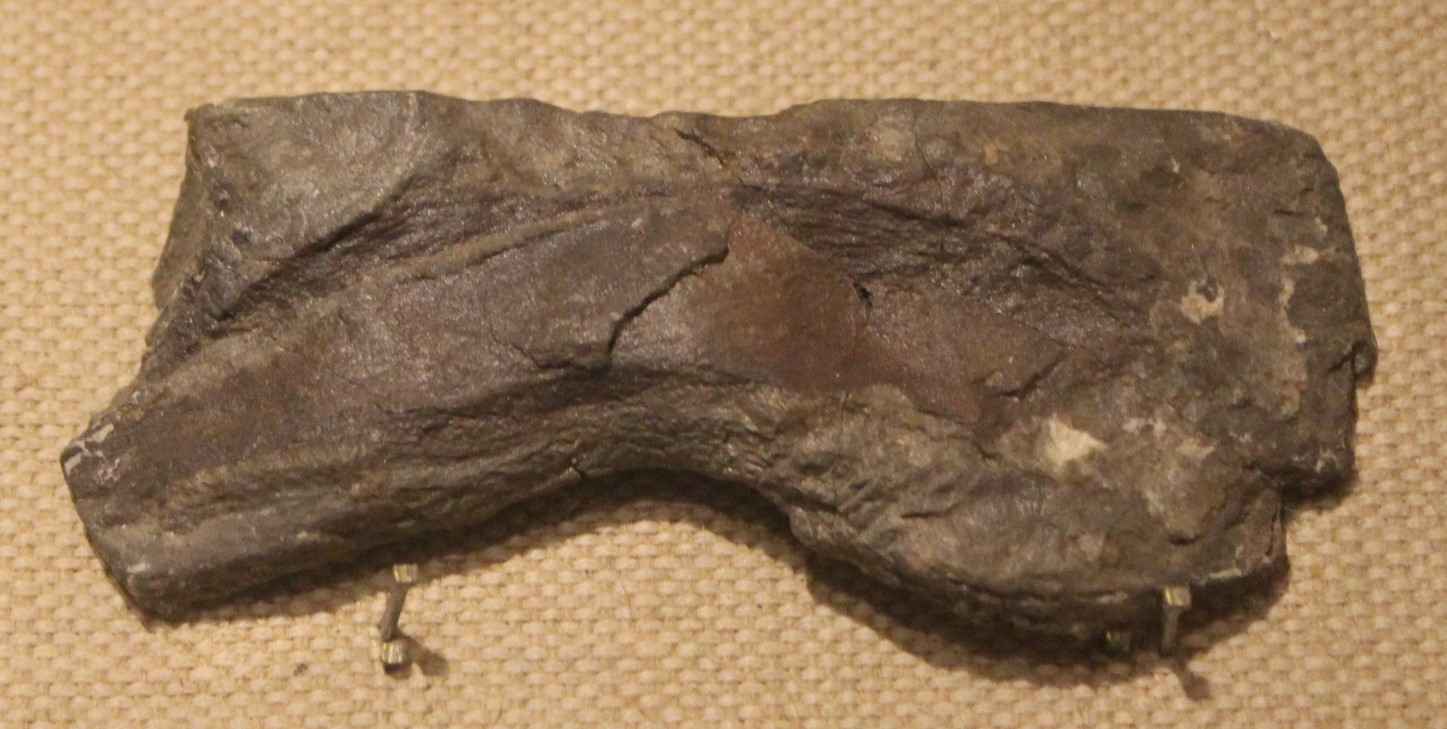
- Holotype jaw of S. pani, Paleozoological Museum of China

Scientific classification
- Domain: Eukaryota
- Kingdom: Animalia
- Phylum: Chordata
- Clade: Sarcopterygii
- Clade: Tetrapodomorpha
- Clade: Stegocephali
- Genus: Sinostega; Zhu et al., 2002

Type species
- S. pani Zhu et al., 2002

= Sinostega =

Sinostega Temporal range: Late Devonian

Extinct genus of tetrapodomorphs

Sinostega ("Chinese roof") is an extinct genus of early "tetrapod" from the Late Devonian of China.

The fossil was discovered in the Ningxia Hui Autonomous Region, northwest China, and consist of a fragmentary lower jawbone measuring 7 cm in length. It is the first Devonian tetrapod to be found in Asia.
