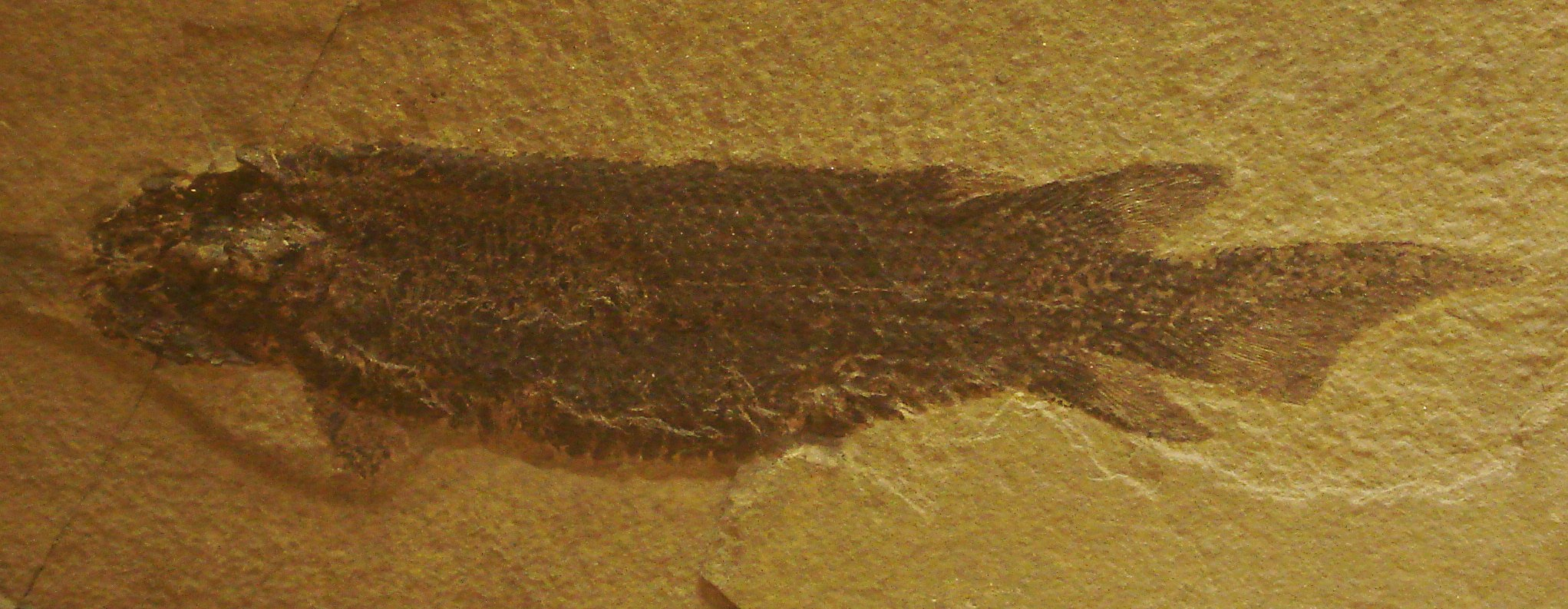

Scientific classification
- Kingdom: Animalia
- Phylum: Chordata
- Class: †Osteolepidida
- Order: †Osteolepiformes
- Family: †Osteolepididae
- Genus: †Thursius; Traquair, 1888

Type species
- †Thursius pholidotus Traquair, 1888

= Thursius =

Extinct genus of fishes

Thursius is a genus of prehistoric lobe-finned fish.
