= Muranjilepis =

Muranjilepis Temporal range: Emsian

Scientific classification
- Kingdom: Animalia
- Phylum: Chordata
- Clade: Sarcopterygii
- Clade: Rhipidistia
- Clade: Tetrapodomorpha
- Genus: †Muranjilepis; Young & Schultze, 2005
- Species: †M. winterensis

Binomial name
- †Muranjilepis winterensis Young & Schultze, 2005

Extinct genus of tetrapodomorphs

Muranjilepis is an extinct genus of tetrapodomorphs from the Early Devonian of Australia.
