= Supratemporal bone =

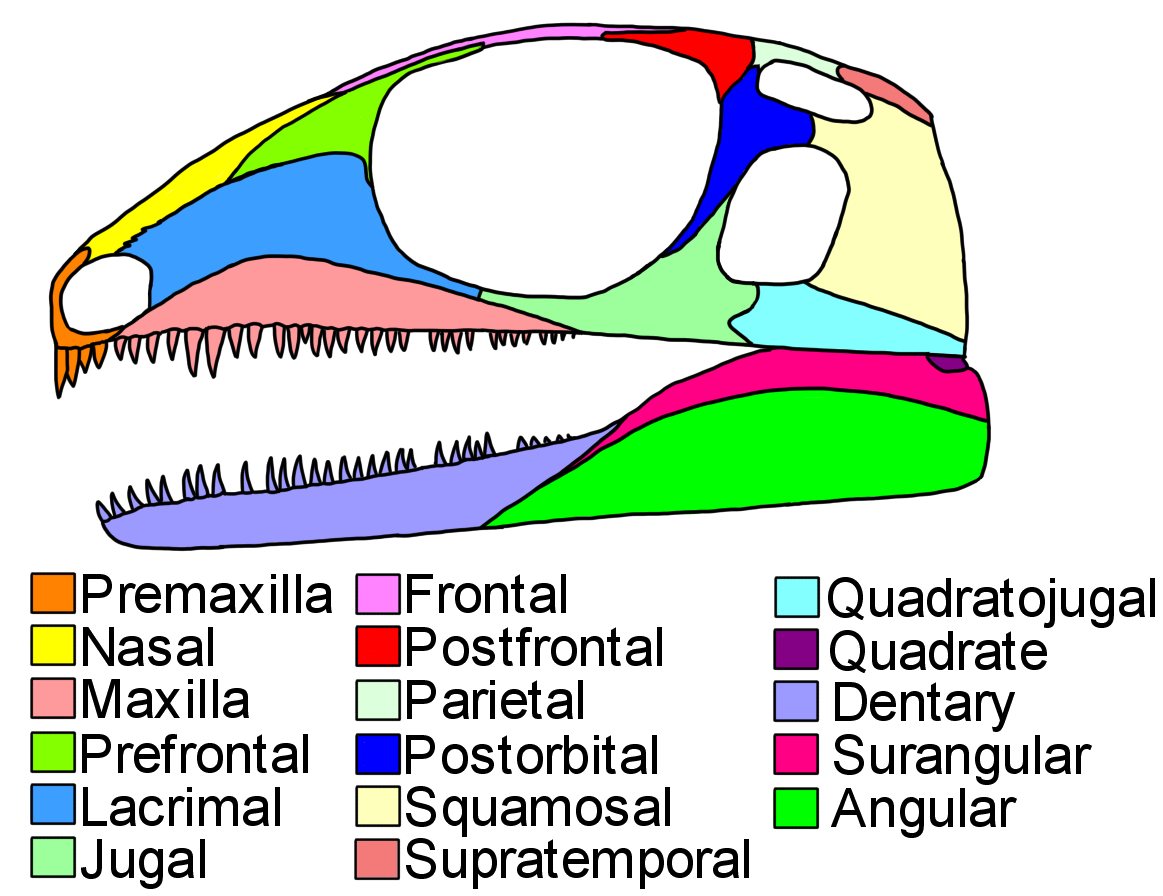
Skull of Petrolacosaurus, showing supratemporal on upper right

The supratemporal bone is a paired cranial bone present in many tetrapods and tetrapodomorph fish. It is part of the temporal region (the portion of the skull roof behind the eyes), usually lying medial (inwards) relative to the squamosal and lateral (outwards) relative to the parietal and/or postparietal. It may also contact the postorbital or intertemporal (which lie forwards), or tabular (which lies backwards), when those bones are present.

The supratemporal is a common component of the skull in many extinct amphibians, though it is apparently absent in the lightweight skulls of living lissamphibians (frogs and salamanders). Embryological studies of salamanders suggests that the supratemporal fuses with the squamosal in early development. A separate supratemporal was retained by early synapsids and reptiles, but was strongly reduced in many groups. Squamates (lizards and snakes) still possess a small supratemporal, though archosaurs (crocodilians and birds) and mammals lack it. Some extinct turtle relatives (like Proganochelys) have a prominent supratemporal, but it is absent or fused to adjacent bones in modern turtles.
