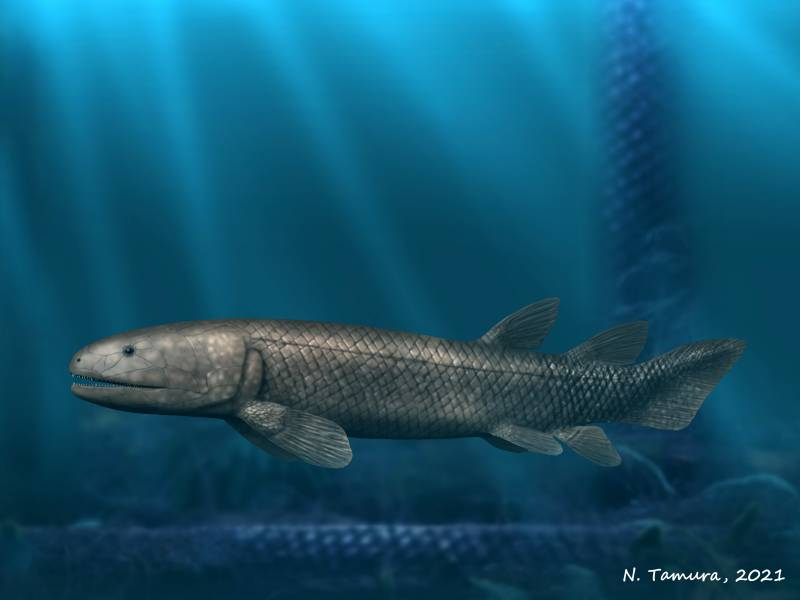
- Life restoration of Megalichthys hibberti

Scientific classification
- Kingdom: Animalia
- Phylum: Chordata
- Clade: Tetrapodomorpha
- Clade: †Megalichthyiformes; Coates & Friedman, 2010

Subgroups
- †Gogonasus; †Gyroptychius; †Litoptychus; †Medoevia; †Osteolepis; †Megalichthyidae

= Megalichthyiformes =

Megalichthyiformes Temporal range: 396–273 Ma Middle Devonian to early Permian

Extinct clade of tetrapodomorphs

Megalichthyiformes is an extinct clade of basal tetrapodomorphs which first appeared during the Devonian period. It was named in 2010 by Michael I. Coates and Matt Friedman, who defined it as a stem-based taxon containing all tetrapodomorphs closer to Megalichthys than to Eusthenopteron.

Below is a cladogram showing Megalichthyiformes modified from Swartz (2012).

- Megalichthyiformes
  - †Gogonasus
  - - †Gyroptychius
    - - †Osteolepis
      - - †Medoevia
        - †Megalichthyidae
