= Spodichthys =

Spodichthys Temporal range: Late Devonian

Scientific classification
- Kingdom: Animalia
- Phylum: Chordata
- Family: †Tristichopteridae
- Genus: †Spodichthys; Jarvik, 1985
- Species: †S. buetleri

Binomial name
- †Spodichthys buetleri Jarvik, 1985

Extinct monospecific genus of tetrapodomorphs

Spodichthys is an extinct monospecific genus of fish that lived in what is now Greenland during the Late Devonian. The type and only species is Spodichthys buetleri.

It was placed into the family Tristichopteridae by U. J. Borgen and H. A. Nakrem in 2016.
