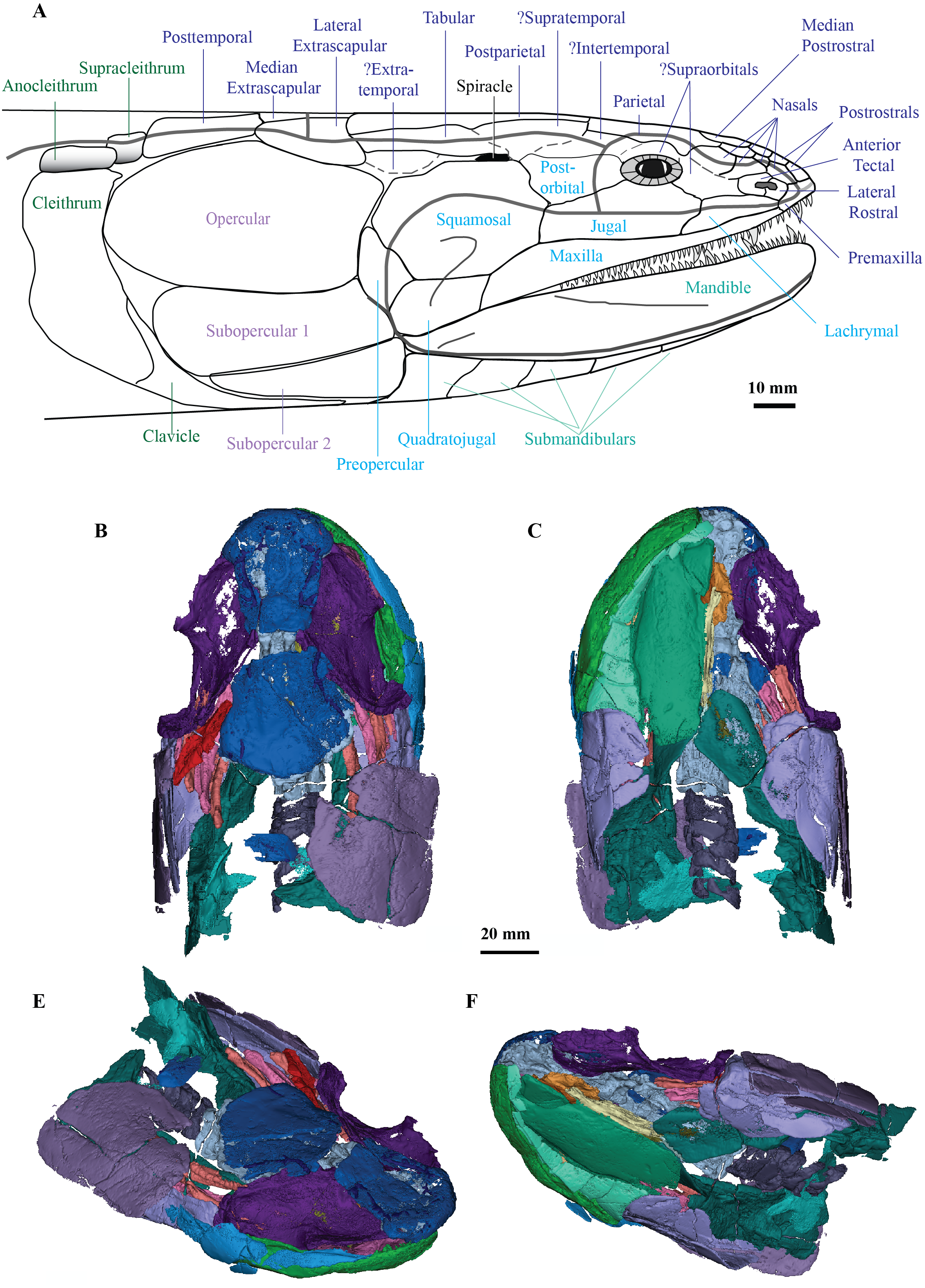
- Skull and pectoral girdle

Scientific classification
- Kingdom: Animalia
- Phylum: Chordata
- Clade: †Megalichthyiformes
- Family: †Megalichthyidae
- Genus: †Cladarosymblema; Fox et al., 1995
- Species: †C. narrienense

Binomial name
- †Cladarosymblema narrienense Fox et al., 1995

= Cladarosymblema =

Cladarosymblema Temporal range: Early Carboniferous (Viséan)

Extinct genus of tetrapodomorphs

Cladarosymblema is an extinct genus of megalichthyid tetrapodomorphs which lived in Australia during the Viséan age of the Early Carboniferous. It was described from the Raymond Formation, Drummond Basin in Queensland, Australia. The animal is known from two well-preserved 3D specimens, were scanned using micro-CT and synchrotron tomography which allowed for new anatomical details to be studied.
