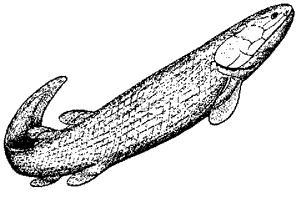
- Life restoration

Scientific classification
- Kingdom: Animalia
- Phylum: Chordata
- Clade: †Megalichthyiformes
- Family: †Megalichthyidae
- Subfamily: †Ectosteorhachinae; Borgen & Nakrem, 2016
- Genus: †Ectosteorhachis; Cope, 1880
- Species: †E. nitidus

Binomial name
- †Ectosteorhachis nitidus Cope, 1880

= Ectosteorhachis =

Ectosteorhachis Temporal range: Asselian to Kungurian

Extinct genus of tetrapodomorphs

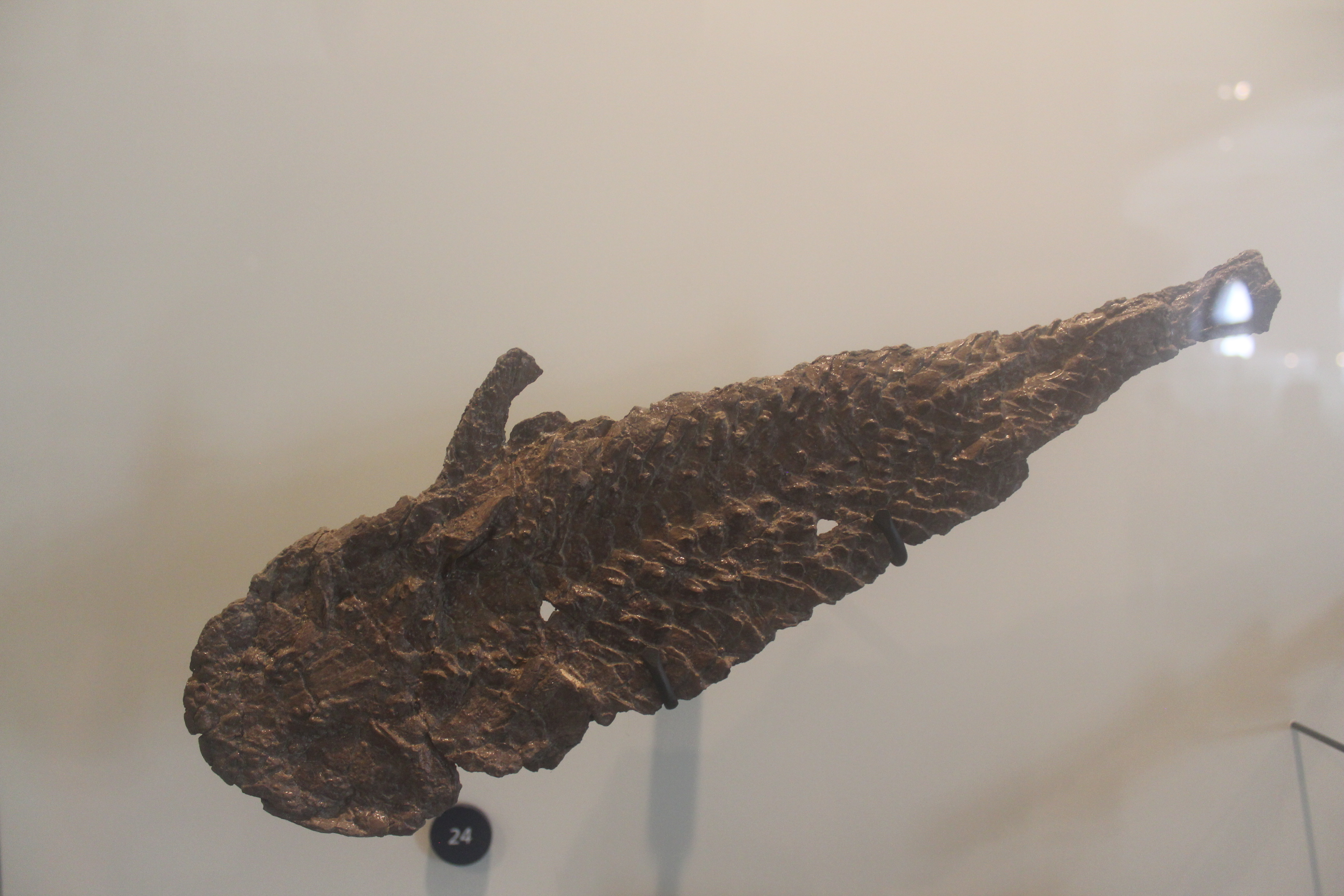
Ectosteorhachis fossil at the AMNH

Ectosteorhachis is an extinct genus of freshwater megalichthyid tetrapodomorphs that inhabited what is now North America during the Permian period (Cisuralian epoch, about 299 to 272 million years ago). It is the only known member of the subfamily Ectosteorhachinae. Fossil remains are known from the United States.

It contains a single species, E. nitidus from the Asselian/Sakmarian to Kungurian of Oklahoma and Utah (Hennesey and Cutler Formations). A second species, E. ciceronius Cope, 1883 from the Garber Formation of Oklahoma has no type specimen and is thus invalid. Remains tentatively assigned to Ectosteorhachis are known from the Washington Formation of Ohio.
