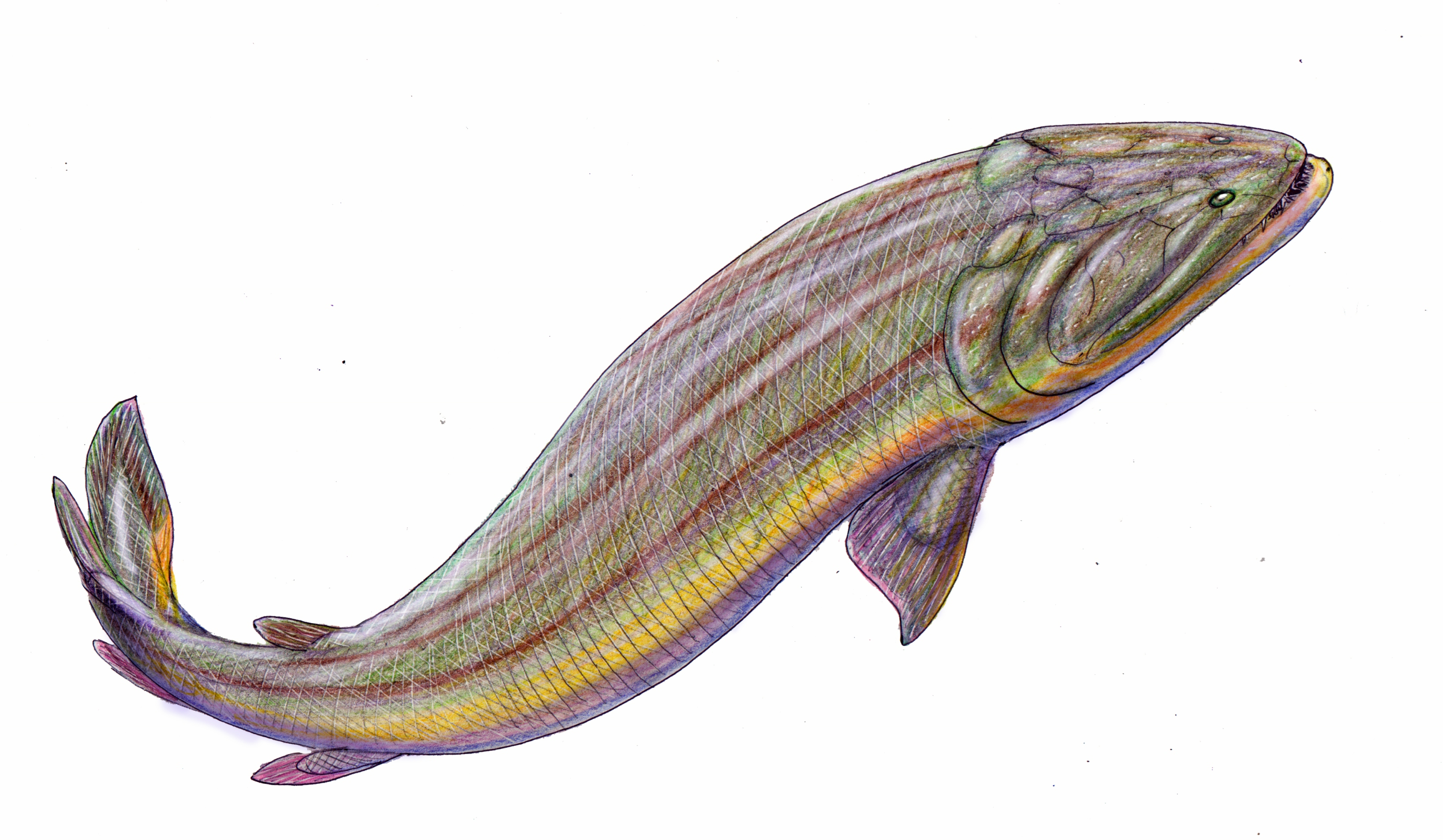
- Life reconstruction of Gooloogongia loomesi

Scientific classification
- Kingdom: Animalia
- Phylum: Chordata
- Clade: Tetrapodomorpha
- Class: †Rhizodontida
- Genus: †Gooloogongia; Johanson & Ahlberg, 1998
- Species: †G. loomesi

Binomial name
- †Gooloogongia loomesi Johanson & Ahlberg, 1998

= Gooloogongia =

Gooloogongia Temporal range: Devonian 360 Ma

Extinct genus of tetrapodomorphs

Gooloogongia (/ˌɡʊlʊˈɡɒŋɡiə/ GUU-luu-GONG-gee-ə) is an extinct monospecific genus of lobe-finned fish which belonged to the group of rhizodont fish. Gooloogongia lived during the Late Devonian period (Famennian stage, around 360 million years ago). Fossils have been found in the Canowindra site, (Australia). It was named by Zerina Johanson and Per Ahlberg in 1998. In general size and shape Gooloogongia is similar to the modern saratoga which lives in the tropical rivers of northern Australia.

Gooloogongia loomesi ("Loomes' Gooloogong") named after Bruce Loomes, the foreman of the 1993 excavation of the Canowindra site, and the town of Gooloogong, NSW. Gooloogongia is based on Gooloogong, variant of Goolagong, meaning 'deep water hole'.

== Description ==
Gooloogongia was large in size (about 90 cm). Like other lobe-finned fishes, Gooloogongia had two rows of teeth in the jaw, the outer row being small teeth, and the inner row being larger fangs. The fangs of Gooloogongia are sharp and needle-like, but they were probably not strong enough to penetrate the armor plating of small placoderms.
