= Canowindridae =

Canowindridae Temporal range: 374–359 Ma Late Devonian

Scientific classification
- Kingdom: Animalia
- Phylum: Chordata
- Clade: Tetrapodomorpha
- Family: †Canowindridae

Genera
- †Beelarongia Long 1987; †Canowindra Thomson 1973; †Koharalepis Young, Long & Ritchie 1992; †Marsdenichthys Long 1985; †Owensia

Extinct family of tetrapodomorphs

The Canowindridae are a family of prehistoric tetrapodomorphs which lived during the Devonian period (Famennian stage, about 374 to 359 million years ago). Fossils belonging to this family have been found in Australia, Antarctica, and Europe.

== Phylogeny ==
Below is a cladogram from Swartz, 2012.

- - ?†Owensia chooi Holland 2009
  - †Marsdenichthys longioccipitus Long 1985
  - - †Canowindra grossi Thomson 1973
    - - †Beelarongia patrichae Long 1987
      - †Koharalepis jarviki Young, Long & Ritchie 1992
