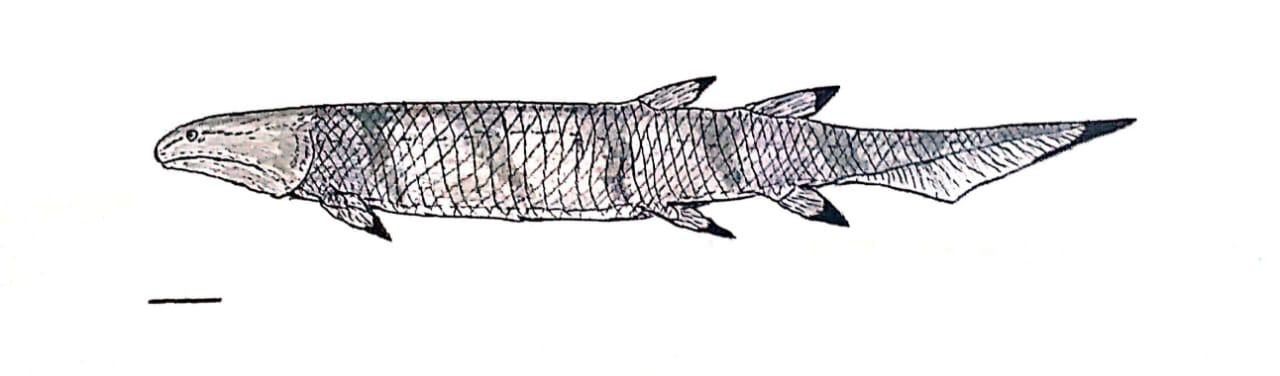
- Kenichthys campbelli

Scientific classification
- Kingdom: Animalia
- Phylum: Chordata
- Clade: Sarcopterygii
- Clade: Rhipidistia
- Clade: Tetrapodomorpha
- Genus: †Kenichthys; Chang and Zhu, 1993

Type species
- †Kenichthys campbelli Chang and Zhu, 1993

= Kenichthys =

Kenichthys Temporal range: 393–382 Ma Early Devonian

Extinct genus of tetrapodomorphs

Kenichthys is a genus of sarcopterygian fish from the Devonian period, and a member of the clade Tetrapodomorpha. The only known species of the genus is Kenichthys campbelli (named for the Australian palaeontologist Ken Campbell), the first remains of which were found in China in 1993. The genus is important to the study of the evolution of tetrapods due to the unique nature of its nostrils, which provide vital evidence regarding the evolutionary transition of fish-like nostrils to the tetrapod choanae.

== Description ==
Kenichthys was a small tetrapodomorph, with a skull about 2 centimetres (0.79 in) long. While only areas of the front of the body are known, it seems likely that Kenichthys would have been similar in general body form to other basal sarcopterygians, with two dorsal fins, paired pectoral and pelvic fins and an anal fin.

An important way in which Kenichthys differed from other tetropodomorphs however is in the positioning of its posterior nostril. Whilst in other tetrapodomorphs this nostril is positioned in the roof of the mouth (the palate), in Kenichthys it is found at the jaw margin, between the premaxilla and maxilla.

== Fossils ==
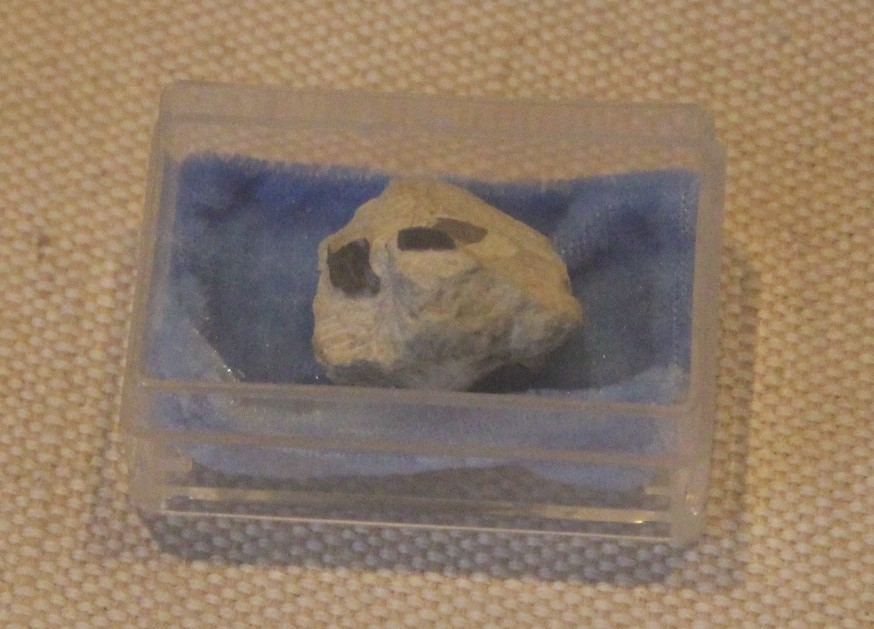
Holotype (IVPP V10493.1), Paleozoological Museum of China

The original fossil material of Kenichthys was first described in 1993, and consists of various parts of the skull roof, lower jaw and pectoral girdle. They were found in Southwestern China, in the Chuandong Formation in Yunnan province, and are now housed in the Institute of Vertebrate Paleontology and Paleoanthropology, Beijing. The fossils date from the early Devonian, specifically from the Emsian period, about 395 million years ago.

Further material from the skull was later found, and described in 2004. It was this material that established the presence of a transitional external nostril in the species' skull.

== Evolutionary significance ==
Kenichthys is important to the study of the evolution of tetrapods due to the nature of its nostrils. Most non-tetrapod vertebrates (e.g. actinopterygians) possess two sets of nostrils, one set at either end of the nasal cavity, and both sets of which are external. These nostrils play no part in respiration, instead serving an olfactory role. However, in all crown group tetrapods and many stem tetrapods one set of nostrils is found exteriorly, and another interiorly, in the roof of the palate. This arrangement means that the nasal passage leads from the outside of the body into the mouth. The 'inner set' of nostrils are known as choanae, and allow tetrapods to breathe through their nose.

Prior to the description of Kenichthys' nasal passages, exactly how the transition between these two forms had taken place was a source of debate. Various suggestions had been put forward including that the choana was homologous to either the posterior or anterior nostril of non-tetrapods, that it had 'budded off' from one of these passages, or that it was an entirely novel form, unrelated to either of the other nostrils. The debate was further complicated by the fact that lungfishes, another group of sarcopterygian fish, also possess a choana with a different form to that of tetrapodomorphs.

The character state of the nostrils of Kenichthys demonstrates that the vertebrate choana did in fact evolve by migration of the posterior external nostril around the jaw and up onto the roof of the mouth. Kenichthys suggests that this migration took place on the route between the premaxilla and the maxilla.

This evolutionary transition appears to have left its mark on tetrapod development. A cleft palate may form in humans (and other tetrapods) where the tissues that will become the premaxilla and the maxilla fail to join during development. This condition is similar to the situation found in Kenichthys.

== Systematics ==
Kenichthys has consistently been seen as one of the most basal tetrapodomorphs since its discovery. Below is a recent cladogram modified from Swartz, 2012:

- Tetrapodomorpha
  - Kenichthys
  - - Rhizodontidae
    - - Canowindridae
      - - Megalichthyiformes
        - Eotetrapodiformes
          - Tristichopteridae
          - - Tinirau
            - - Platycephalichthys
              - Elpistostegalia

== See also ==
- Choana
- Sarcopterygians
- Tetrapodomorphs
