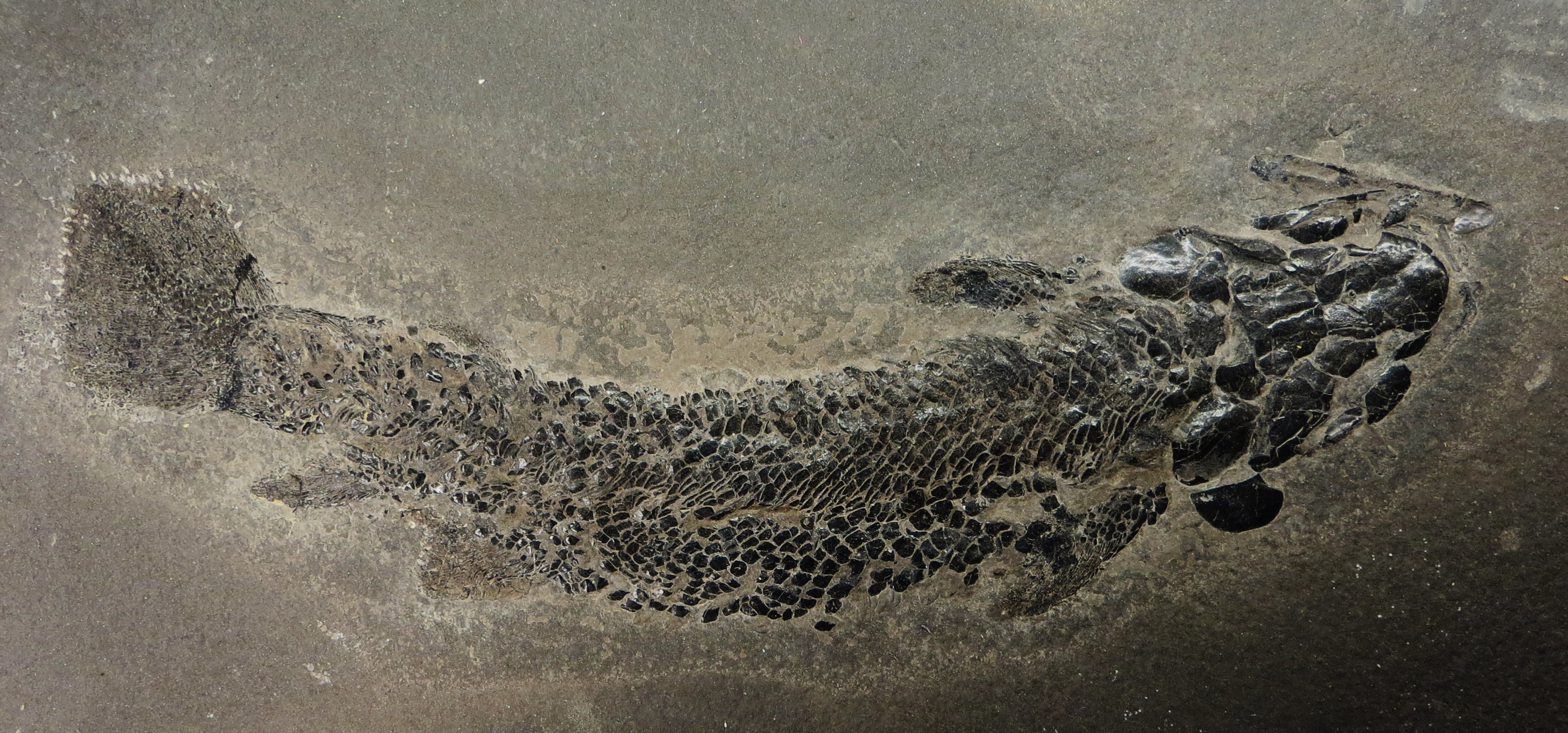
- Specimen of G. agassizi, Naturalis Biodiversity Center

Scientific classification
- Kingdom: Animalia
- Phylum: Chordata
- Class: †Osteolepidida
- Order: †Osteolepiformes
- Family: †Gyroptychiidae; Berg, 1958
- Genus: †Gyroptychius; McCoy, 1848

Type species
- †Diplopterus agassizi Traill, 1841

Species
- See text

Synonyms
- Diplopterus Agassiz, 1835

= Gyroptychius =

Gyroptychius Temporal range: mid-late Devonian (Eifelian to Givetian)

Extinct genus of tetrapodomorphs

Gyroptychius is an extinct genus of freshwater osteolepiform tetrapodomorphs from the middle to late Devonian period. It is the only known member of the family Gyroptychiidae. They were found throughout much of what is now northern Europe and Greenland, with more dubious records from Canada, Australia & Antarctica.

The following species are known:

- †G. agassizi (Traill, 1841) (type species) - Eifelian to Givetian of Scotland, including the Orkney Isles (Stromness Flagstone and Caithness Flagstone) (=Glyptolepis microlepidotus Agassiz, 1844)
- †G. dolichotatus Jarvik, 1985 - Eifelian of Greenland (Nathorst Fjord Formation)
- †G. elgae Vorobyeva, 1977 - Givetian of Estonia (Burtnieki Formation)
- †G. groenlandicus Jarvik, 1950 - Givetian of Greenland (Nathorst Fjord Formation)
- †G. milleri Jarvik, 1948 - Givetian of Scotland (Caithness Flagstone) & Estonia (=Gyroptychius pauli Vorobyeva, 1977)

The following, more dubious species are also known: G.? kiaeri Jarvik, 1949 (Devonian of Norway), G.? taylori Jessen, 1968 (Devonian of Canada), G.? australis Young & Gorter, 1981 (Early Devonian of Australia), and G.? antarcticus (Woodward, 1921) (Famennian-aged Aztec Siltstone of Antarctica). Of these, G.? australis may potentially be referable to the East Asian genus Kenichthys, while G. antarcticus is a nomen nudum.

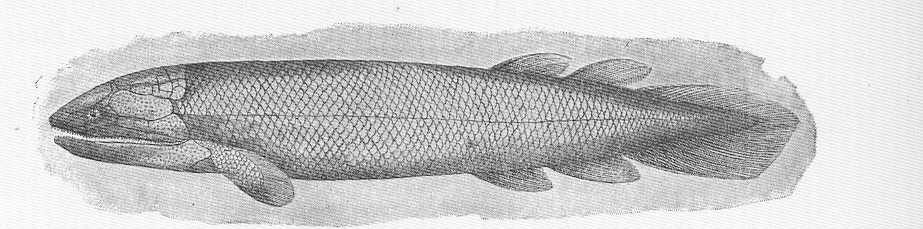
Life restoration of G. agassizi

Gyroptychius was a fast riverine predator with an elongated body about 30 centimetres (12 in) long. As its eyes were relatively small, it is presumed to have hunted by smell rather than sight. Gyroptychius had short jaws which gave it a powerful bite. All its fins except the pectorals were moved to the back to the body, increasing the power of the tail while swimming.
