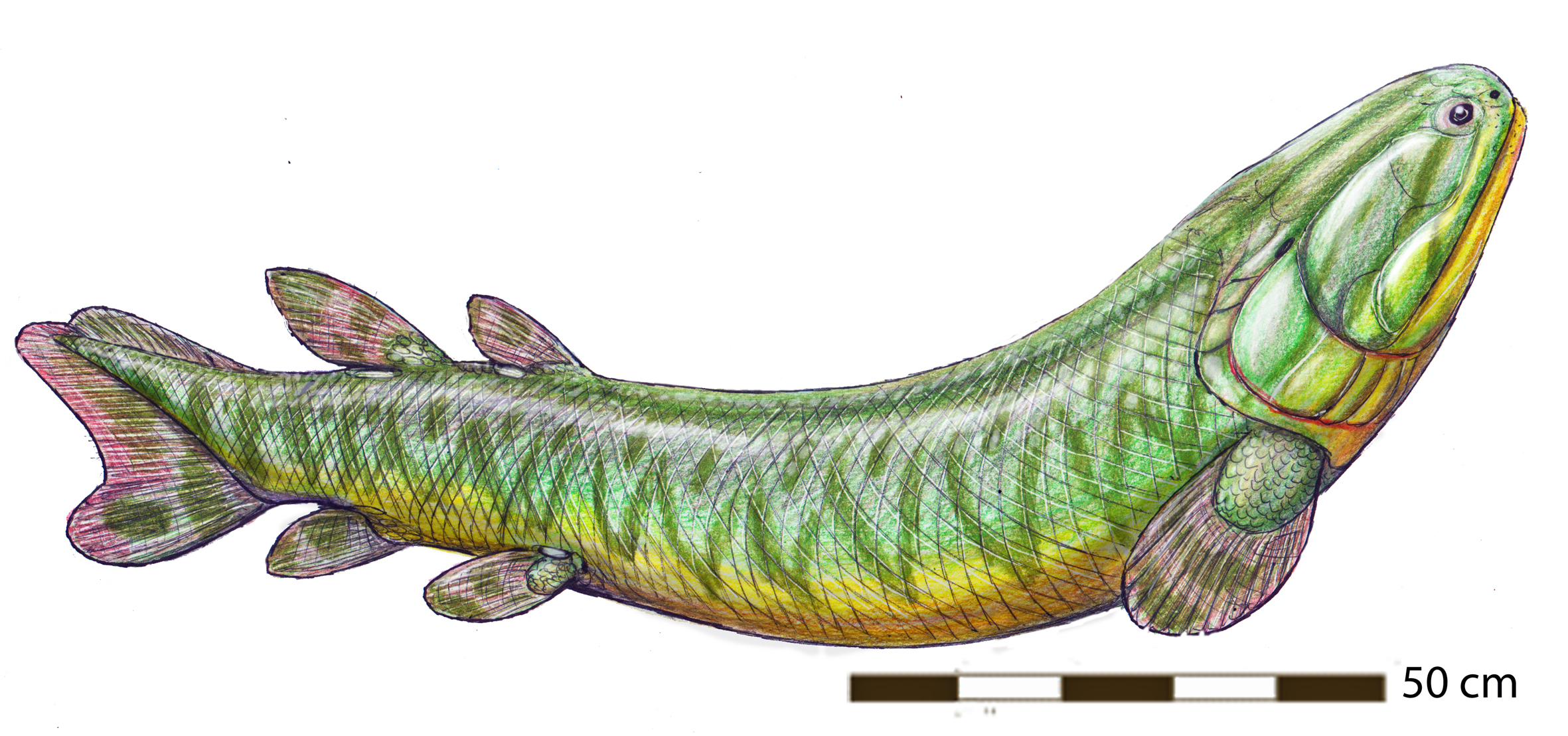
- Restoration of M. hibberti

Scientific classification
- Kingdom: Animalia
- Phylum: Chordata
- Clade: †Megalichthyiformes
- Family: †Megalichthyidae
- Genus: †Megalichthys; Agassiz, 1839

Type species
- Megalichthys hibberti Agassiz, 1839

Species
- M. hibberti Agassiz, 1839; M. pygmaeus Traquair, 1879; M. laticeps Traquair, 1884; M. syndentolaminaris Borgen and Nakrem, 2016; M. mullisoni Downs and Daeschler, 2020

= Megalichthys =

Megalichthys Temporal range: 365.0–298.9 Ma Devonian - Carboniferous

Extinct genus of fishes

Megalichthys is a genus of prehistoric lobe-finned fish which lived during the Devonian and Carboniferous periods. It is the type genus of the family Megalichthyidae. The type species is M. hibberti. The species M. mullisoni, named for fossil preparator C Frederick Mullison, is known from the Catskill Formation of Pennsylvania.
