= Koharalepis =

Koharalepis Temporal range: Middle Devonian

Scientific classification
- Domain: Eukaryota
- Kingdom: Animalia
- Phylum: Chordata
- Clade: Sarcopterygii
- Clade: Tetrapodomorpha
- Family: †Canowindridae
- Genus: †Koharalepis; Young & Ritchie, 1992
- Species: †K. jarviki

Binomial name
- †Koharalepis jarviki Young & Ritchie, 1992

Extinct genus of tetrapodomorphs

Koharalepis is an extinct genus of canowindrid tetrapodomorphs which lived in what is now Antarctica during the Middle Devonian. It contains one species, K. jarviki.
