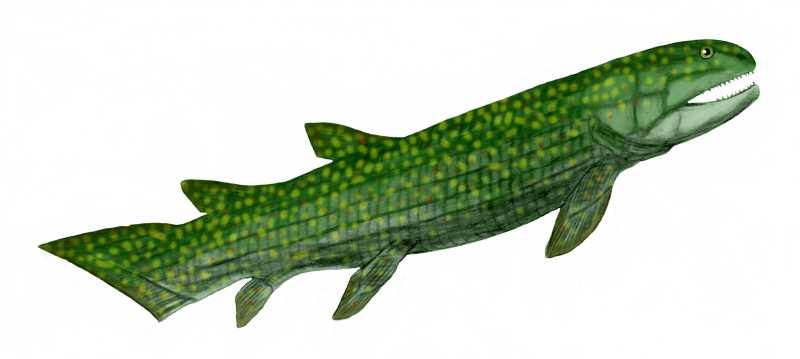
- Life reconstruction of Gogonasus andrewsae
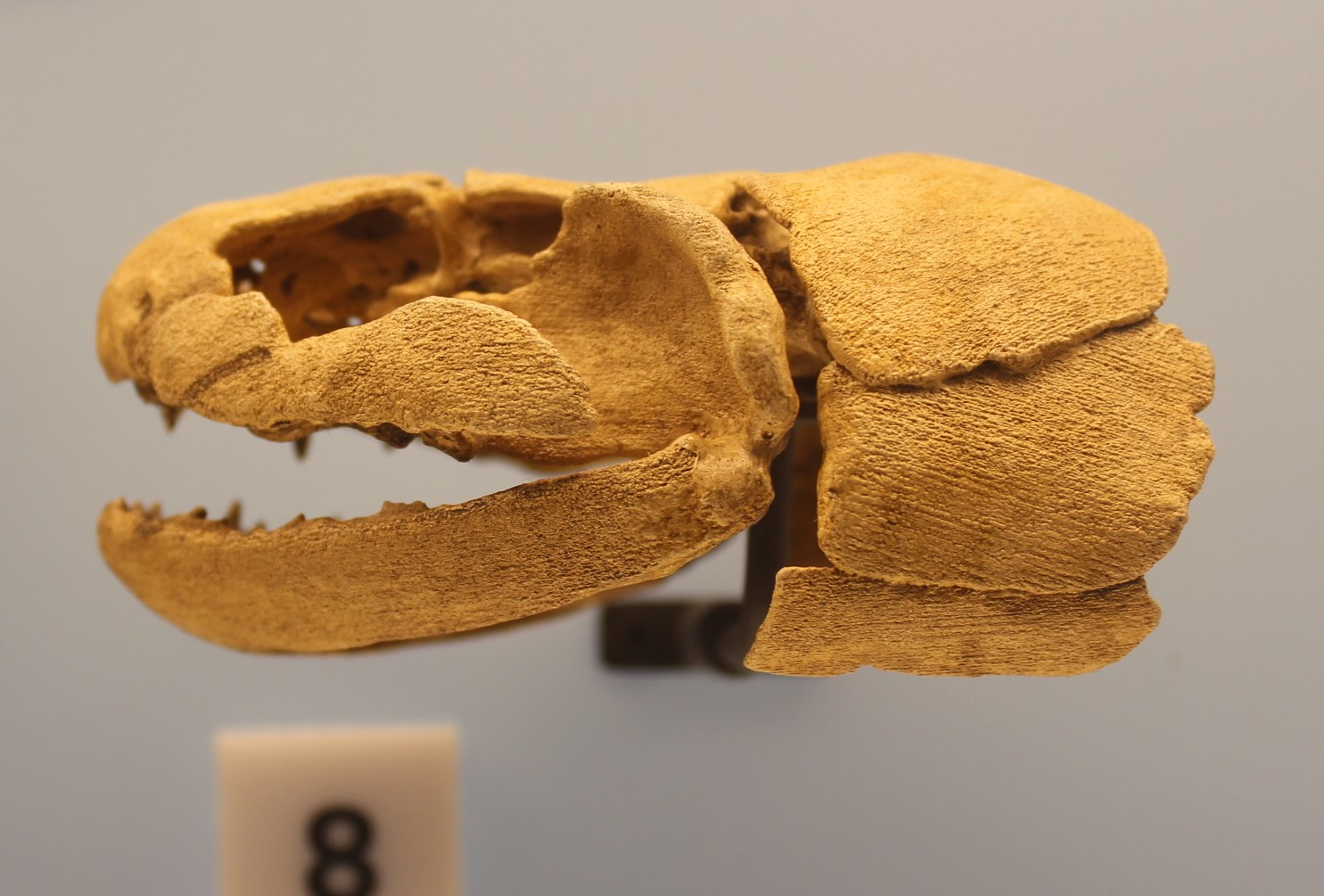
- Skull of Gogonasus andrewsae, National Museum of Natural History

Scientific classification
- Kingdom: Animalia
- Phylum: Chordata
- Class: †Osteolepidida
- Order: †Osteolepiformes
- Family: †Osteolepidae
- Genus: †Gogonasus; Long, 1985
- Species: †G. andrewsae

Binomial name
- †Gogonasus andrewsae Long, 1985

= Gogonasus =

Gogonasus Temporal range: Devonian, 380 Ma

Extinct genus of tetrapodomorphs

Gogonasus (meaning "snout from Gogo") is an extinct monospecific genus of lobe-finned fish known from preserved 380-million-year-old fossils found from the Gogo Formation in Western Australia. It lived in the Late Devonian period, on what was once a 1,400-kilometre-long (870 mi; 760 nmi) coral reef off the Kimberley coast surrounding north-western Australia. Gogonasus was a small fish reaching 30 to 40 centimetres (12 to 16 in) in length.

Its skeleton shows several features that were like those of a four-legged land animal (tetrapod). They included the structure of its middle ear, and its fins show the precursors of the forearm bones, the radius and ulna. Researchers believe it used its forearm-like fins to dart out of the reef to catch prey.

Gogonasus was first described from a single snout (ethmosphenoid) by John Long in 1985. On Long's 1986 expedition to Gogo, the first relatively complete skull of Gogonasus was found by Chris Nelson, and after being prepared by Long, who solved a scientific controversy by showing that the inner large fangs of the coronoid bones did not insert into the choana of the palate (Long 1988) as had been suggested by Rosen et al. (1981) for Eusthenopteron. In 1990, a combined expedition from the Western Australian Museum and the Australian National University yielded another almost complete skull of Gogonasus, this one found by Dr R. E. Barwick. The full description of its cranial anatomy appeared in Long, J. A., Barwick, R. E. & Campbell, K.S.W. (1997), although not all aspects of the skull were clear then even from the three specimens. In 2005 Long led another expedition back to Gogo and on July 11 one of the team members, Dr Tim Senden from the Australian National University, found a very well-preserved skeleton of Gogonasus, containing almost the complete fish down to the tip of the tail. It was Dr Senden's first field trip with the other researchers.

The specimen NMV P221807 is now held at Museum Victoria, after nearly four months of acetic acid preparation by John Long. The new specimen showed some surprising new data not seen in any of the other specimens. Firstly, there were large spiracular openings on top of the skull, with a distinct down-folded cosmine-covered lamina of bone present on the tabular bone. This indicated its spiracles were almost as large as in the elpistostegalian fishes (like Tiktaalik) and early tetrapods (e.g. Acanthostega). Secondly, after preparation of its pectoral fins, the internal limb skeleton showed closer resemblances to that of the elpistostegalians than to other more generalised tetrapodomorph fishes like Eusthenopteron. For almost 100 years, Eusthenopteron had been the well-used role model for demonstrating stages in the evolution of lobe-finned fishes to tetrapods. Gogonasus now replaces Eusthenopteron in being a better preserved representative without any ambiguity in interpreting its anatomy (as had been shown for example by Rosen et al. 1981 when erroneously reconstructing the fit of the lower jaws to the palate). Superficially, Gogonasus appears similar to the generalised tetrapodomorph fish like Osteolepis from Scotland, but in its advanced features shows that even primitive-looking cosmine-covered forms evolved significant specializations towards becoming tetrapod-like.

Gogonasus is just one of the over 45 species of preserved fish from the Gogo Formation deposit. It is the only Devonian site in the world to yield whole complete fish in perfect uncrushed preservation in some specimens.

== See also ==
Other fish found in fossils from the Devonian period:

- Mcnamaraspis, another fish from the Gogo Formation and Western Australia's fossil emblem
- Elpistostege
- Tiktaalik
- Eusthenopteron
- Panderichthys
- Actinistia
- Materpiscis
