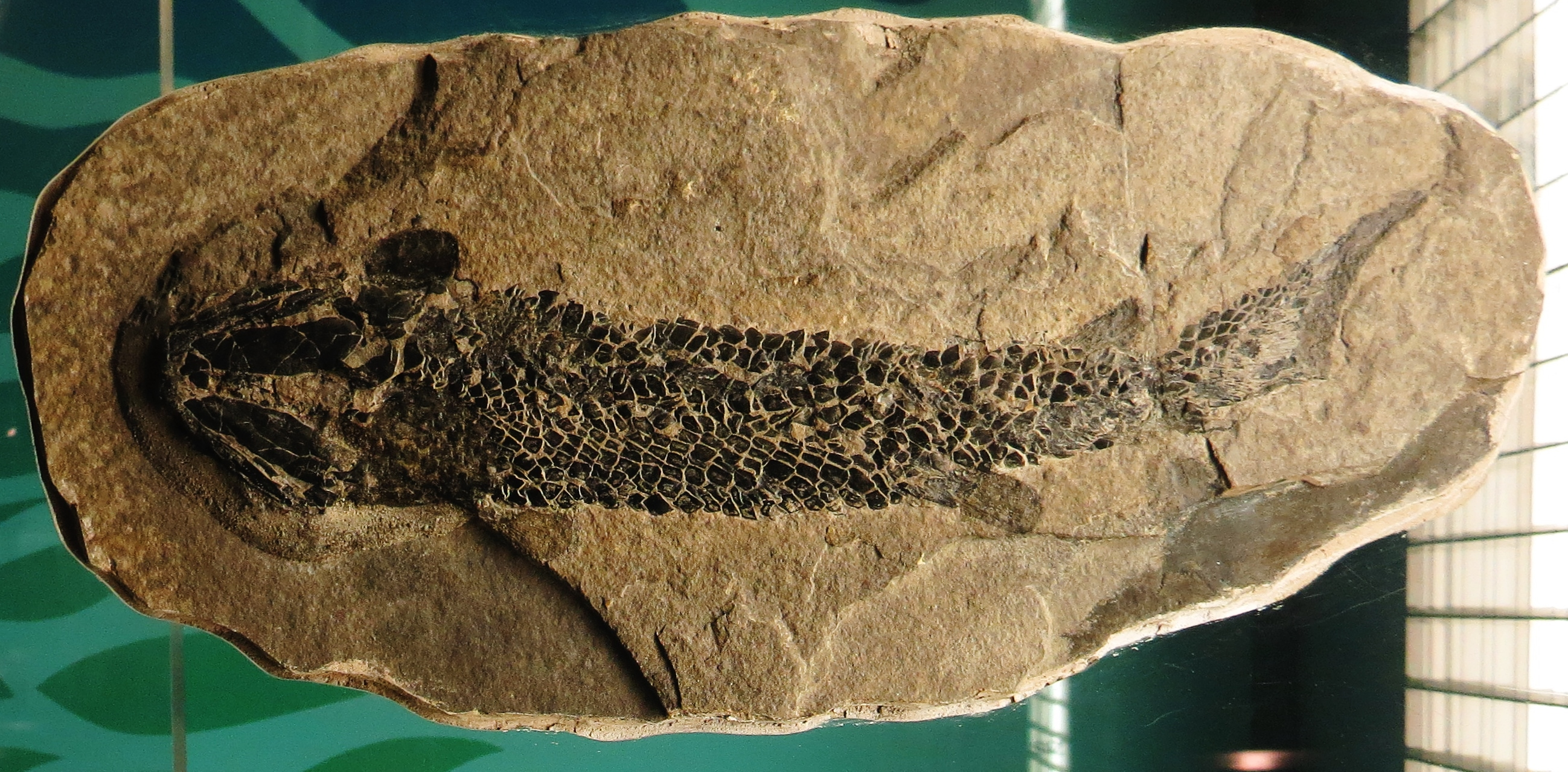
- Fossil of O. macrolepidotus at the Naturmuseum Senckenberg, Frankfurt
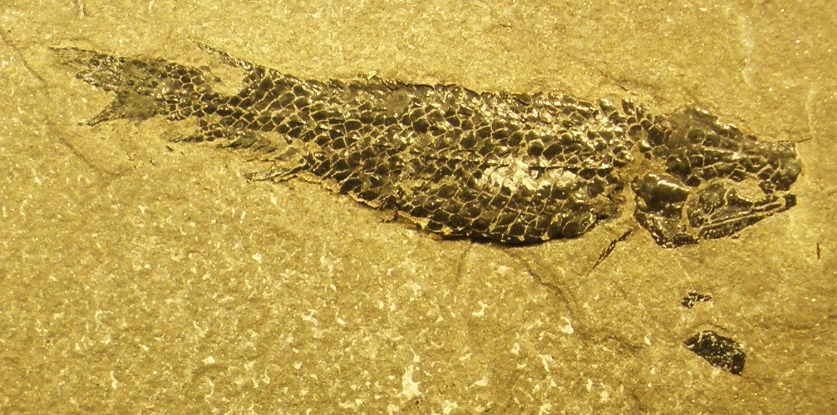
- Fossil of O. panderi at Nederlands Centrum voor Biodiversiteit Naturalis, Leiden

Scientific classification
- Kingdom: Animalia
- Phylum: Chordata
- Class: †Osteolepidida
- Order: †Osteolepiformes
- Family: †Osteolepididae
- Genus: †Osteolepis; Agassiz, 1835

Type species
- Osteolepis macrolepidotus Agassiz, 1835

Other species
- O. panderi Jarvik, 1948

Synonyms
- O. arenatus Agassiz, 1835; O. brevis McCoy, 1848; O. major Agassiz, 1845; O. microlepidotus Agassiz, 1835; Triplopterus pollexfeni McCoy, 1848; Pleiopterus Agassiz, 1835

= Osteolepis =

Osteolepis Temporal range: Middle Devonian

Extinct genus of lobe-finned fish

Osteolepis (from Greek: ὀστέον ostéon 'bone' and Greek: λεπίς lepis 'scale') is an extinct genus of lobe-finned fish from the Devonian period. It lived in Lake Orcadie of northern Scotland.

== Discovery and naming ==
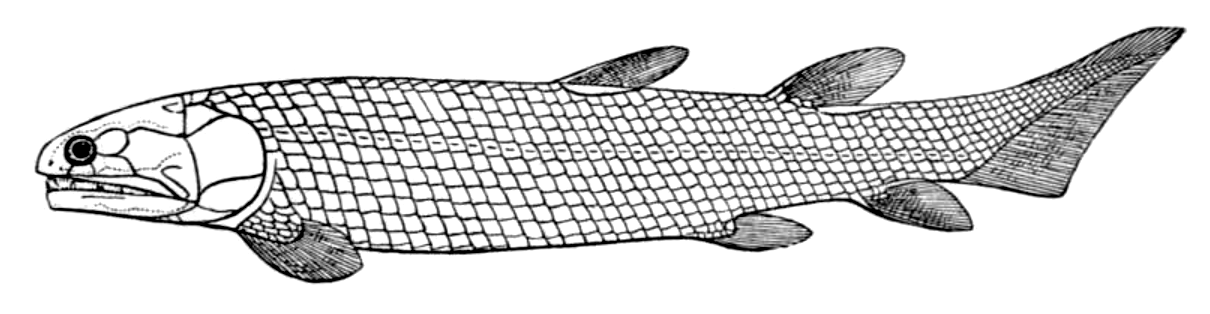
Historic reconstruction of Osteolepis, from 1904

The name Osteolepis was first used in 1829 by authors Sedgwick and Murchison, who assigned two species distinguished by the apparent sizes of their scales: O. macrolepidotus and O. microlepidotus. Their descriptions of both species are considered inadequate to describe a taxon, however, and a detailed description of the genus was not published until 1835 when naturalist Louis Agassiz treated the genus in more detail. Agassiz had previously intended to use the genus name Pleiopterus for the same fossils, but opted instead to use the preexisting genus and species names. In addition to the two species first suggested by Sedgwick and Murchison, Agassiz also named the new species O. arenatus in the same publication. In accordance with Agassiz' description, Osteolepis macrolepidotus is now the type species of the genus.

The species O. arenatus and O. microlepidotus, as well as the species O. major which Agassiz named in 1845, have since been considered identical to the type species O. macrolepidotus. The species O. brevis and the genus and species Triplopterus pollexfeni, both named in 1848 by paleontologist Frederick McCoy, are also considered synonymous with O. macrolepidotus. The features used to distinguish these species were largely the result of taphonomy, rather than actual anatomical distinctions. Specimens identified as O. microlepidotus in 1860 have been found to be distinct from other specimens formerly considered O. microlepidotus, and thus distinct from O. macrolepidotus, and in 1948 paleontologist Erik Jarvik named this species O. panderi. Alongside the type species, O. panderi is the only species still considered valid.

The genus' name is derived from the Greek ὀστέον (ostéon), meaning 'bone' and λεπίς (lepis), meaning 'scale'. The name of the type species, O. macrolepidotus, is derived from the roots μακρός (makrós) and λεπίς (lepis), and translates to 'long-scaled'. The name of the second species, O. panderi, honors Heinz Christian Pander, who first identified its fossils. The name of the now-disused O. arenatus can be translated as 'sandy'.

== Description ==
Osteolepis was about 20 centimetres (7.9 in) long, and covered with large, square scales. The scales and plates on its head were covered in a thin layer of spongy, bony material called cosmine. This layer contained canals that were connected to sensory cells deeper in the skin. These canals ended in pores on the surface and were probably for sensing vibrations in the water.

== Classification ==
Osteolepis was a tetrapodomorph, and was distantly related to tetrapods. It is the name-bearing taxon of the order Osteolepiformes and the family Osteolepidae.

== Paleoecology ==
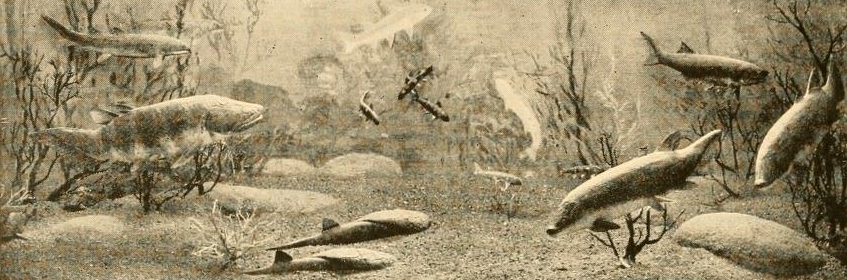
Reconstruction of the Old Red Sandstone paleoenvironment from 1917, featuring Osteolepis in the top left

Osteolepis is known from the Orcadian Basin, which is part of the Old Red Sandstone. This environment was a calm freshwater lake, and was subject to periodic desiccation. During periods where the water was deepest, anoxic (without oxygen) events would result in fish kills, creating the large assemblages of articulated fish fossils that include Osteolepis.

Osteolepis likely fed on small invertebrates such as arthropods and mollusks, and itself may have been prey for larger fish such as Cheirolepis.
