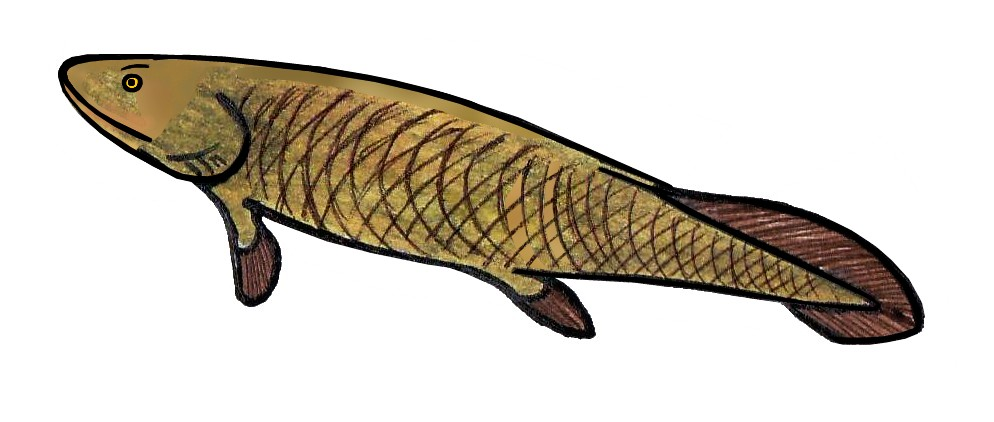
- Life restoration of Panderichthys
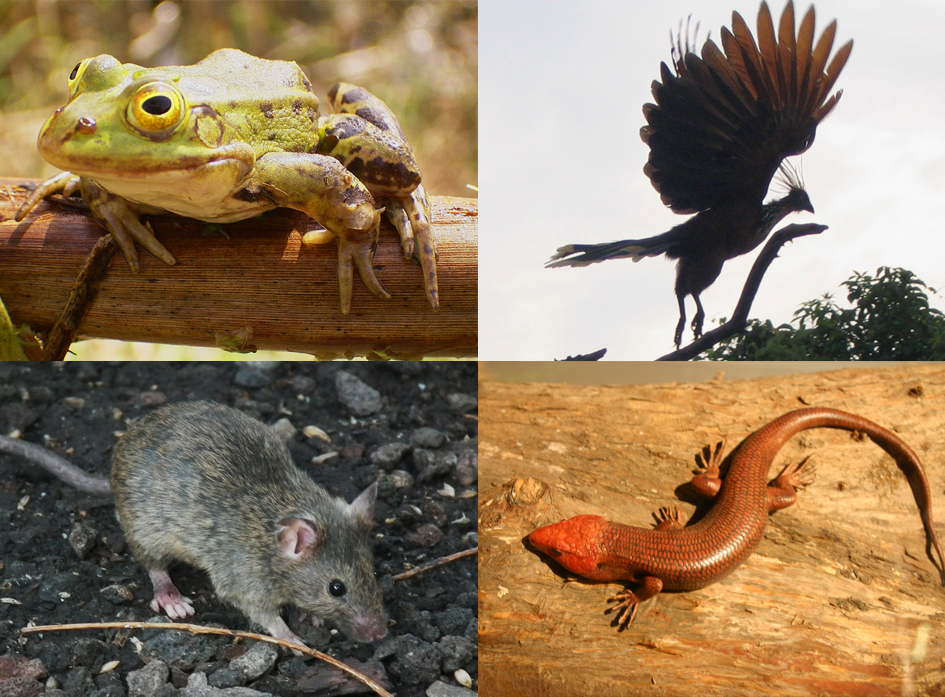
- Modern tetrapods

Scientific classification
- Kingdom: Animalia
- Phylum: Chordata
- Clade: Rhipidistia
- Clade: Tetrapodomorpha; Ahlberg, 1991

Subgroups
- †Kenichthys; †Tungsenia; Choanata; †Rhizodontida; †"Osteolepidida"; †Tristichopteridae; Eotetrapodiformes; Elpistostegalia; Stegocephali; Tetrapoda; See also below.

Synonyms
- Choanata

= Tetrapodomorpha =

Tetrapodomorpha Temporal range: Early Devonian–Present, 409–0 Ma

Clade of vertebrates

Tetrapodomorpha (also known as Choanata) is a clade of vertebrates consisting of tetrapods (four-limbed vertebrates) and their relatives that are more closely related to living tetrapods than to lungfish (clade Dipnomorpha), with whom they form the major sarcopterygian (lobe-finned fish) clade Rhipidistia.

Advanced transitional forms between the fully aquatic lobe-finned fish and the semiaquatic early labyrinthodonts, such as Tiktaalik, have been referred to as "fishapods" by their discoverers, being half-fish, half-tetrapods in external appearance and limb morphology. Apart from the crown group tetrapods (the descendants of the last common ancestor of all amphibians, reptiles, birds and mammals), Tetrapodomorpha contains several basal sister groups collectively known as the osteolepiforms. The paraphyletic group of Tetrapodomorpha minus the crown group Tetrapoda are the stem tetrapods, which encompass the osteolepiforms and the rhizodonts, the latter being a more primitive order with less evolved pelvic fins (which become the hindlimbs in crown-tetrapods).

== Characteristics ==
Among the characteristics defining tetrapodomorphs are modifications to the paired fins — particularly the pectoral fins, which became the forelimbs — notably a humerus with convex head articulating with a more laterally orientated glenoid fossa (the "socket" of the shoulder girdle). The appendicular skeleton became multi-segmented with the formation of elbow, the radius and ulna, and the wrist joint, and the distal dermal lepidotrichia (fin rays) were lost and replaced by increasingly longer phalanges (digit bones). These developments of appendicular skeleton and related skeletal muscles are hypothesized to have allowed better benthic locomotion through underwater vegetation, snags or rock gaps, as well as for burrowing, and later "exapted" for terrestrial locomotion as the tetrapedomorphs became more adapted into the shallow waters of the increasingly expansive Devonian wetlands and opportunistically ventured ashore to forage from the primitive riparian habitats.

Another key trait of the tetrapodomorphs is the choana (internal nostril). Most fish have two pairs of nostrils, one on either side of the head for incoming water (incurrent nostrils) and another pair for outgoing water (excurrent nostrils). In early tetrapodomorphs like Kenichthys, the excurrent nostrils had shifted towards the mouth's perimeter. In later tetrapodomorphs, including tetrapods, the excurrent nostril is positioned inside the mouth, where it is known as the choana. The nearly-equivalent clade Choanata often refers to these later forms specifically.

== History ==
Tetrapodomorph fossils are known from the early Devonian onwards, and include Osteolepis, Panderichthys, Kenichthys and Tungsenia. Tetrapodomorpha evolved from ancient lobe-finned fish (sarcopterygians) around 390 million years ago in the Middle Devonian period.

== Stem tetrapoda ==
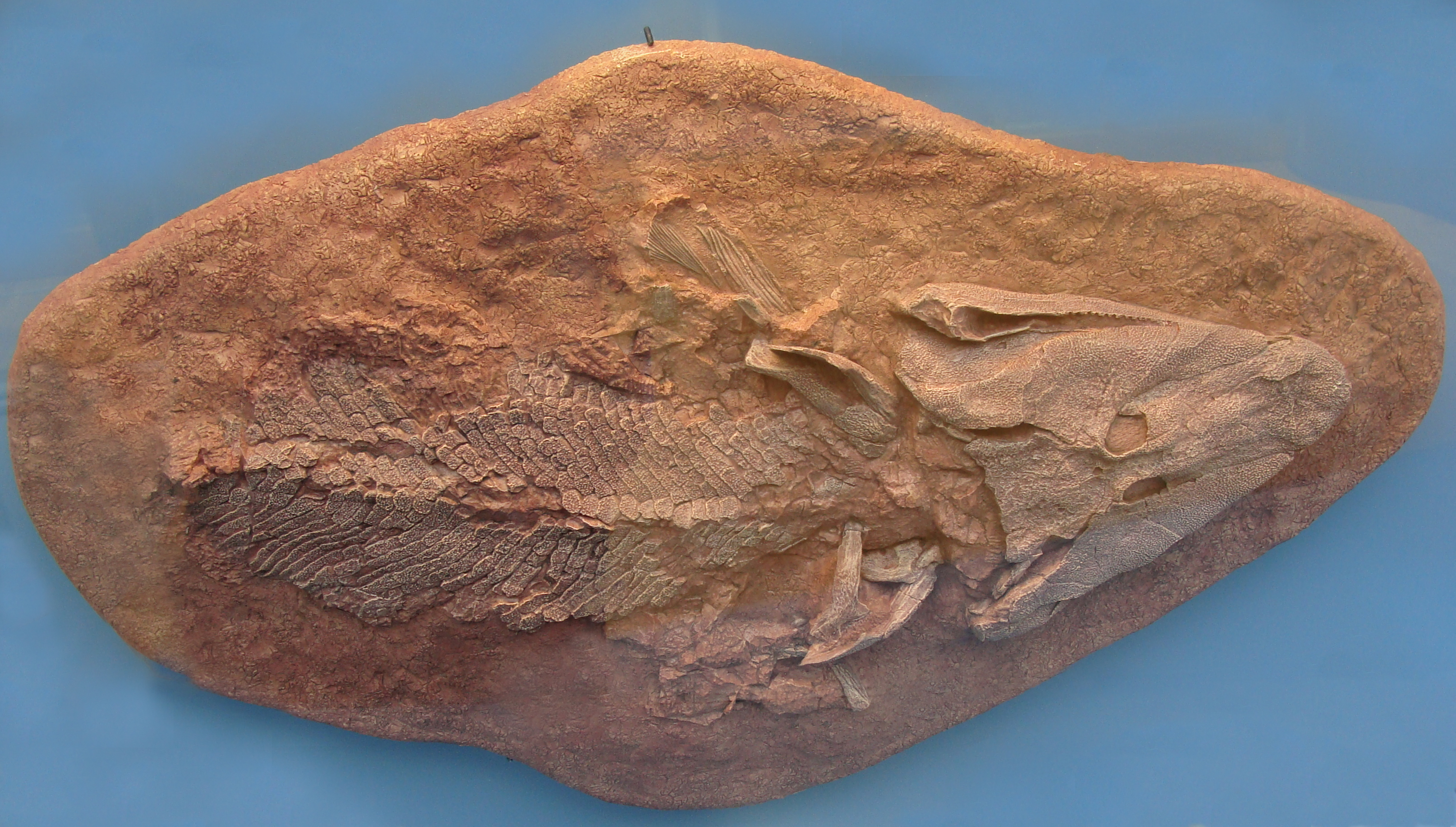
Tiktaalik, a tetrapodomorph with wrists, straddles the fish-tetrapod divide

The stem Tetrapoda are a grade containing all animals more closely related to extant four-legged vertebrates than to their closest extant relatives (the lungfish), but excluding the crown group Tetrapoda themselves (i.e. stem tetrapods are paraphyletic and thus do not form a natural group). Thus, the transition from "fish-like" finned sarcopterygians to tetrapods with fully developed limbs and digits occurred among stem tetrapods.

=== Content of the group ===
Stem tetrapods are members of Tetrapodomorpha, the total group and clade that also includes their descendants, the crown tetrapods:

The stem Tetrapoda encompass three distinct grades successively closer to crown group Tetrapoda:

- Osteolepiformes, a group of lobe-finned fishes that includes the families Tristichopteridae, Canowindridae, Megalichthyidae, and Osteolepidae
- Elpistostegalia, the more advanced lobe-finned fishes (Tristichopteridae) and the "fishapods" (genera such as Panderichthys and Tiktaalik)
- Ichthyostegalia, the primarily aquatic primitive labyrinthodonts such as Acanthostega, Ichthyostega, Tulerpeton, and probably loxommatids.

Both Ichthyostegalia and Labyrinthodontia constitute paraphyletic evolutionary grades rather than clades, with amniotes and modern amphibians branching off at some point from the latter. The stem tetrapods may also include one or both of Temnospondyli and Lepospondyli, depending on author. This is due to the uncertain origin of the modern amphibians, whose position in the phylogenetic tree dictates what lineages go in the crown group Tetrapoda. Neither is there for the moment a consensus of the phylogeny of stem tetrapods, nor how Tetrapoda itself should be defined (i.e. as a crown group, or as an apomorphy-based group, using the limb with digits), making the actual content of the group uncertain.

== Classification ==
In Late Devonian vertebrate speciation, descendants of pelagic lobe-finned fish.

The exact shape of the phylogenetic tree is uncertain, with Zachelmie tetrapod tracks predating most tetrapodomorph fossils

=== Taxonomy ===
After Benton, 2004; and Swartz, 2012.

- Subclass Sarcopterygii

- Infraclass Tetrapodomorpha

- Order †Rhizodontida

- Family †Sauripteridae
- Family †Rhizodontidae

- Superorder †Osteolepidida (or Osteolepiformes)

- Family †Canowindridae
- Family †Thysanolepidae
- Family †Tristichopteridae

- Order †Osteolepiformes (or Megalichthyiformes)

- Family †Osteolepidae
- Family †Megalichthyidae

- Clade Eotetrapodiformes

- Clade Elpistostegalia (or Panderichthyida)

- Clade Stegocephalia

- Family †Elpistostegidae
- Family †Whatcheeriidae
- Family †Colosteidae
- Superfamily †Baphetoidea
- Superclass Tetrapoda

Other clades include the Eotetrapodiformes (Tinirau, Platycephalichthys, the Tristichopteridae and Elpistostegalia). Older taxa which include late stem tetrapods and early tetrapods are the Labyrinthodontia and Ichthyostegalia.

=== Relationships ===
The cladogram is based on a phylogenetic analysis of 46 taxa using 204 characters by B. Swartz in 2012.

- Tetrapodomorpha
  - †Kenichthys
  - - †Rhizodontidae
    - - - †Canowindridae
          - †Marsdenichthys
          - - †Canowindra
            - - †Koharalepis
              - †Beelarongia
      - - †Megalichthyiformes
          - †Gogonasus
          - - †Gyroptychius
            - - †Osteolepis
              - - †Medoevia
                - †Megalichthyidae
        - Eotetrapodiformes
          - †Tristichopteridae
            - †Spodichthys
            - - †Tristichopterus
              - - †Eusthenopteron
                - - †Jarvikina
                  - - †Cabonnichthys
                    - - †Mandageria
                      - †Eusthenodon
          - - †Tinirau
            - - †Platycephalichthys
              - Elpistostegalia
                - †Panderichthys
                - - - †Tiktaalik
                    - †Elpistostege
                  - - †Elginerpeton
                    - - †Ventastega
                      - - †Acanthostega
                        - - †Ichthyostega
                          - - †Whatcheeriidae
                            - - †Colosteidae
                              - - †Crassigyrinus
                                - - †Baphetidae
                                  - Tetrapoda (crown group)

The following cladogram follows the results found by Clement et al. (2021).

- Dipnomorpha
- Tetrapodomorpha
  - Kenichthys
  - - Tungsenia
    - - Rhizodontida
        - Hongyu
        - - Gooloogongia
          - - Sauripterus
            - Barameda
            - - Screbinodus
              - - Rhizodus
                - Strepsodus
      - - Osteolepidida
          - Gyroptychius
          - Osteolepis
          - - Gogonasus
            - Medoevia
            - - Megalichthyidae
              - Canowindridae
                - Beelarongia
                - - Canowindra
                  - Koharalepis
        - - Marsdenichthys
          - - Spodichthys
            - - Tristichopterus
              - - Eusthenopteron
                - - Jarvikina
                  - - - Cabonnichthys
                      - - Platycephalichthys
                        - - Mandageria
                          - Eusthenodon
                    - - Tinirau
                      - - Bruehnopteron
                        - - Panderichthys
                          - - Tiktaalik
                            - - Elpistostege
                              - Tetrapoda
                                - Ventastega
                                - - Acanthostega
                                  - - Ichthyostega
                                    - Tulerpeton
