= Mount Howitt fossil site =

Fossil locality in Victoria, Australia

- Stratigraphic range: Middle Devonian (Givetian) 387.9–382.3 Ma
- Type: Fossil locality
- Unit of: Bindaree Formation
- Thickness: Up to 700 m (2,300 ft) (Bindaree Formation)

Lithology
- Primary: Shale
- Other: Mudstone

Location
- Location: Howitt Plains, Victoria
- Coordinates: 37.182°S 146.649°E
- Region: Victoria
- Country: Australia
- Mount Howitt fossil site (Australia) Mount Howitt fossil site (Victoria)

The Mount Howitt fossil site is a fossil locality, part of the Bindaree Formation of the Avon River Group. It is located in the Alpine National Park in eastern Victoria, Australia. Its fossils date back to the Givetian stage of the Middle Devonian epoch, though it was once considered Frasnian in age. The fauna of Mount Howitt represents a well-preserved and quite diverse Middle Devonian fish assemblage, among the best of any single area in the Southern Hemisphere, and has been an important key for correlating the biostratigraphy of the region.

The site presents remarkable fossil species diversity, and preserves fish fossils across a wide range of life stages from larvae to mature fish. Mount Howitt contributes an important record of the evolution of fish across a freshwater lacustrine environment, and the development of features that allowed vertebrates to depart from the water to colonize terrestrial environments for the first time in Earth's history.

Some of the fossil taxa discovered at Mount Howitt include the canowindrid Beelarongia patrichae, the placoderms Austrophyllolepis ritchiei, three species of Bothriolepis: B. cullodenensis, B. fergusoni and B. gippslandiensis, as well lungfishes such as Barwickia downunda and Howidipterus donnae and the coelacanth Gavinia syntrips. These fossils collectively possess outstanding heritage value for the nation in their place of the evolution of vertebrates during what is known as the 'Age of Fishes'.

== Paleobiota ==
=== Placodermi ===
Placoderms of Mount Howitt
Genus	Species	Clade	Images
Austrophyllolepis	A. ritchiei	Arthrodira, Phyllolepididae	A restoration of Austrophyllolepis ritchiei.
Bothriolepis	B. cullodenensis	Antiarchi, Bothriolepididae	Two Bothriolepis canadensis reconstructions.
Bothriolepis	B. fergusoni	Antiarchi, Bothriolepididae	Two Bothriolepis canadensis reconstructions.
Bothriolepis	B. gippslandiensis	Antiarchi, Bothriolepididae	Two Bothriolepis canadensis reconstructions.
Groenlandaspis	G. howittensis	Arthrodira, Groenlandaspididae	Groenlandaspis howittensis diagram.

=== Sarcopterygii ===
Sarcopterygians of Mount Howitt
Genus	Species	Clade	Images
Barwickia	B. downunda	Dipnoi, Fleurantiidae	
Beelarongia	B. patrichae	Tetrapodomorpha, Canowindridae	
Gavinia	G. syntrips	Coelacanthiformes, Miguashaiidae	G. syntrips skull diagram.
Howidipterus	H. donnae	Dipnoi, Fleurantiidae	
Howittichthys	H. warrenae	?Elpistostegalia incertae sedis	
Marsdenichthys	M. longioccipitus	Tetrapodomorpha incertae sedis	

=== Other ===
Other Fishes of Mount Howitt
Genus	Species	Clade	Images
Culmacanthus	C. stewarti	Diplacanthiformes, Culmacanthidae	
Howittacanthus	H. kentoni	Acanthodiformes, Acanthodidae	
Howqualepis	H. rostridens	Palaeonisciformes (Palaeoniscoidei incertae sedis)	
