= Zachelmie trackways =

Paleontological discovery in Poland

The Zachelmie trackways are a series of Middle Devonian-age trace fossils in Poland, purportedly the oldest evidence of terrestrial vertebrates (tetrapods) in the fossil record. These trackways were discovered in the Wojciechowice Formation, an Eifelian-age carbonate unit exposed in the Zachełmie Quarry of the Świętokrzyskie Mountains (Holy Cross Mountains). The discovery of these tracks has complicated the study of tetrapod evolution. Morphological studies suggest that four-limbed vertebrates ("tetrapods" in the broad sense, also known as stegocephalians) are descended from a specialized type of tetrapodomorph fish, the elpistostegalians. This hypothesis was supported further by the discovery and 2006 description of Tiktaalik, a well-preserved elpistostegalian from the Frasnian of Nunavut. Crucial to this idea is the assumption that tetrapods originated in the Late Devonian, after elpistostegalians appear in the fossil record near the start of the Frasnian. The Zachelmie trackways, however, appear to demonstrate that tetrapods were present prior to the Late Devonian. The implications of this find has led to several different perspectives on the sequence of events involved in tetrapod evolution.

== Discovery ==
Animation showing the gait of the Zachelmie trackmaker based on preserved tracks

In January 2010, a group of paleontologists published a paper which showed that the first tetrapods appeared long before any known fossils of Tiktaalik or other elpistostegids. This paper was accompanied by extensive supplementary material and also discussed in a Nature documentary on the origin of tetrapods. Their conclusions were based on numerous trackways (esp. Muz. PGI 1728.II.16) and individual footprints (esp. Muz. PGI 1728.II.1) discovered at the Zachełmie quarry.

A tetrapod origin of those tracks was suggested based on:

- Distinct digits and limb morphology;
- Trackways reflecting quadrupedal gait and diagonal walk;
- No body or tail drag marks;
- Very wide stride in relation to body length (much beyond that of Tiktaalik or any other fish);
- Various size footprints with some unusually big (up to 26 cm wide) indicating body lengths of over 2.5 m.

Track-bearing layers were assigned to the lower-middle Eifelian based on conodont index fossil samples (costatus Zone) and "previous biostratigraphic data obtained from the underlying and overlying strata" with subsequent studies confirming this dating. The Eifelian stage is the first stage of the Middle Devonian, more than 10 million years older than the Frasnian-age Tiktaalik. It is far older than any known tetrapod fossils, and even older than most fossils of tetrapodomorph fish.

A reanalysis by Martin Qvarnström, Piotr Szrek, Per Ahlberg, and Grzegorz Niedźwiedzki, of the paleoenvironment of the Zachelmie trackways were reinterpreted as "a succession of ephemeral lakes with a restricted and non-marine biota, rather than a marginal marine environment as originally thought". This shows that the purported tetrapods associated with the trackways were likely capable of terrestrial locomotion.

== Implications for tetrapod evolution ==
Zachełmie trackmakers predate not only ichthyostegids and elpistostegids (including Tiktaalik) but also a number of tetrapodomorph fish which until 2010 were unanimously considered ancestors of tetrapods.

Tiktaalik's discoverers were skeptical about the Zachelmie trackways. Daeschler said that trace evidence was not enough for him to modify the theory of tetrapod evolution, while Shubin argued that Tiktaalik could have produced very similar footprints. In a later study Shubin expressed a significantly modified opinion that some of the Zachelmie footprints, those which lacked digits, may have been made by walking fish. However, Ahlberg insisted that those tracks could not have possibly been formed either by natural processes or by transitional species such as Tiktaalik or Panderichthys. Instead, the authors of the publication suggested that "ichthyostegalian"-grade tetrapods were the responsible trackmakers, based on available pes morphology of those animals. However, a paper published in 2015 that undertook a critical review of Devonian tetrapod footprints called into question the designation of the Zachelmie marks and instead suggested an origin as fish nests or feeding traces. A 2012 study on Ichthyostega biomechanics indicated that Zachelmie trackmakers were even more advanced than Ichthyostega in terms of adaptation for quadrupedalism. Grzegorz Niedźwiedzki's reconstruction of one of the trackmakers was identical to that of Tulerpeton.

Narkiewicz, co-author of the article on the Zachelmie trackways, claimed that the Polish "discovery has disproved the theory that elpistostegids were the ancestors of tetrapods", a notion partially shared by Philippe Janvier.

Spencer Lucas questions if the Zachelmie trackways were made by tetrapods due to the inconsistent size of the tracks and morphology of the manus and pes being inconsistent with known tetrapod trackways. The morphology of the trackways and the freshwater environmental setting are suggested to be consistent with fish feeding traces/nests.

Several new hypotheses have been suggested to resolve the origin and phylogenetic position of the elpistostegids (including Tiktaalik) relative to tetrapods:

- Their phylogenetic position remains unchanged and the footprints found in the Holy Cross Mountains are attributed to tetrapods but as a result there are at least six long ghost lineages separating Zachelmie trackmakers from various elpistostegalian and ichthyostegalian species;
- They were "late-surviving relics rather than direct transitional forms";
- They were a result of convergent or parallel evolution. This would indicate that many of the apomorphies (derived traits) and striking anatomical similarities found in both digit-bearing tetrapods and elpistostegalians evolved at least twice, potentially for the same ecological utility. This would indicate that elpisostegids went extinct in the Late Devonian without any descendants, an "evolutionary dead-end" as some have phrased it. Homoplasy (convergent evolution) is considered responsible for several supposedly unique tetrapod features which are also found in non-elpistostegalian Paleozoic fish. The lobe-finned rhizodont Sauripterus has finger-like jointed distal radial bones, while the actinopterygian Tarrasius has a tetrapod-like spinal column with 5 axial regions.

== See also ==
- Tiktaalik
- Evolution of tetrapods
- Elpistostegalia
- Stegocephalia
