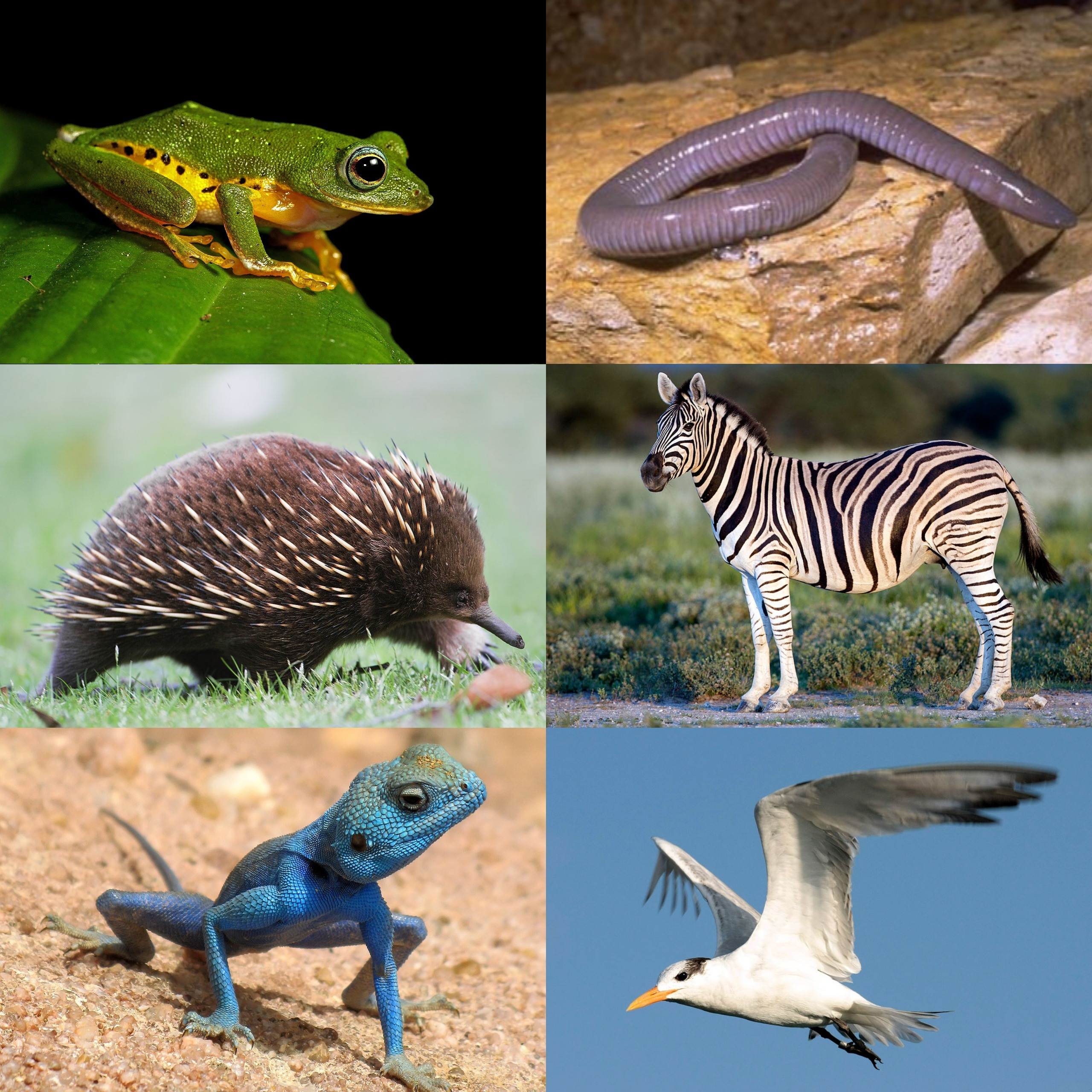
- Clockwise from top left: Mercurana myristicapaulstris, a shrub frog; Dermophis mexicanus, a caecilian (a limbless tetrapod); Equus quagga, a plains zebra; Sterna maxima, a royal tern; Pseudotrapelus sinaitus, a Sinai agama; Tachyglossus aculeatus, a short-beaked echidna

Scientific classification
- Kingdom: Animalia
- Phylum: Chordata
- Clade: Stegocephali
- Clade: Tetrapoda; Hatschek & Cori, 1896 [Laurin]

Subgroups
- †"Ichthyostegalia"?; Batrachomorpha / Amphibia; various †extinct clades; Lissamphibia; Reptiliomorpha / Pan-Amniota; various †extinct clades; Amniota; Synapsida (includes mammals); Sauropsida (includes reptiles and birds)

= Tetrapod =

Tetrapods Temporal range: Famennian–present

Clade of the first four-limbed vertebrates and their descendants

A tetrapod (/ˈtɛtrəˌpɒd/; from Ancient Greek τετρα (tetra) 'four' and πούς (poús) 'foot') is any vertebrate animal of the clade Tetrapoda (/tɛˈtræpədə/). The main diagnostic and defining trait (synapomorphy) of tetrapods is having four limbs, connected to the shoulder- and pelvic girdles, for which the group is named. As a clade, Tetrapoda is defined such that it includes every organism which descended from four-limbed ancestors, including those which have lost some or all of these limbs, e.g. snakes.

Tetrapods include all extant and extinct amphibians and amniotes, with the latter in turn evolving into two major clades, the sauropsids (reptiles, including dinosaurs and therefore birds) and synapsids (extinct "pelycosaurs", therapsids and all extant mammals, including humans). Hox gene mutations have resulted in some tetrapods becoming limbless (snakes, legless lizards, and caecilians) or two-limbed (cetaceans, sirenians, some lizards, kiwis, and the extinct moa and elephant birds). Nevertheless, they still qualify as tetrapods through their ancestry, and some retain a pair of vestigial spurs that are remnants of the hindlimbs.

Tetrapods evolved from a group of semiaquatic animals within the tetrapodomorphs which, in turn, evolved from ancient lobe-finned fish (sarcopterygians) around 390 million years ago in the Middle Devonian period. Early tetrapodomorphs were transitional between lobe-finned fishes and true four-limbed tetrapods, though most still fit the body plan expected of other lobe-finned fishes. The oldest fossils of four-limbed vertebrates (tetrapods in the broad sense of the word) are trackways from the Middle Devonian, and body fossils became common near the end of the Late Devonian, around 370–360 million years ago. These Devonian species all belonged to the tetrapod stem group, meaning that they did not belong to any modern tetrapod group.

Limbs evolved prior to terrestrial locomotion, but by the start of the Carboniferous Period, 360 million years ago, a few stem-tetrapods were experimenting with a semiaquatic lifestyle to exploit food and shelter on land. The first crown-tetrapods (those descended from the last common ancestors of extant tetrapods) appeared by the Tournaisian age of the Early Carboniferous.

The specific aquatic ancestors of the tetrapods and the process by which they colonized Earth's land after emerging from water remains unclear. The transition from a body plan for gill-based aquatic respiration and tail-propelled aquatic locomotion to one that enables the animal to survive out of water and move around on land is one of the most profound evolutionary changes known. Tetrapods have numerous anatomical and physiological features that are distinct from their aquatic fish ancestors. These include distinct head and neck structures for feeding and movements, appendicular skeletons (shoulder and pelvic girdles in particular) for weight bearing and locomotion, more versatile eyes for seeing, middle ears for hearing, and more efficient heart and lungs for oxygen circulation and exchange outside water.

Stem-tetrapods and "fish-a-pods" were primarily aquatic. Modern amphibians are generally semiaquatic; the first stages of their lives are as waterborne eggs and fish-like larvae with gills known as tadpoles, and later undergo metamorphosis to grow limbs and lungs and become partly terrestrial and partly aquatic. However, most tetrapod species today are amniotes, a group of mostly terrestrial tetrapods that evolved early in the Late Carboniferous. The key amniote innovation is the amnion, which enables the eggs to retain their aqueous contents on land. Some tetrapods, such as snakes and caecilians, have lost some or all of their limbs through further speciation and evolution; some only have concealed vestigial bones as a remnant of the limbs of their distant ancestors. Others returned to being amphibious or otherwise living partially or fully aquatic lives, the first during the Carboniferous period, while others, such as whales, as recently as the Cenozoic.

Amniotes diverged into two branches: one, sauropsids, includes the reptiles: lepidosaurs (lizards, snakes, and the tuatara), archosaurs (crocodilians and dinosaurs, of which birds are a subset), turtles, and various other extinct forms. The other branch, synapsids, include mammals and their extinct relatives.

Amniotes include the only animals apart from insects that further evolved powered flight: the extinct pterosaurs and extant birds and bats. In addition, tetrapods are the only terrestrial lineage among animals, excluding the various terrestrial lineages of Protostomia.

== Definitions ==
The precise definition of "tetrapod" is a subject of strong debate among paleontologists who work with the earliest members of the group.

=== Apomorphy-based definitions ===
A majority of paleontologists use the term "tetrapod" to refer to all vertebrates with four limbs and distinct digits (fingers and toes), as well as legless vertebrates with limbed ancestors. Limbs and digits are major apomorphies (newly evolved traits) which define tetrapods, though they are far from the only skeletal or biological innovations inherent to the group. The first vertebrates with limbs and digits evolved in the Devonian, including the Late Devonian-age Ichthyostega and Acanthostega, as well as the trackmakers of the Middle Devonian-age Zachelmie trackways.

Defining tetrapods based on one or two apomorphies can present a problem if these apomorphies were acquired by more than one lineage through convergent evolution. To resolve this potential concern, the apomorphy-based definition is often supported by an equivalent cladistic definition. Cladistics is a modern branch of taxonomy which classifies organisms through evolutionary relationships, as reconstructed by phylogenetic analyses. A cladistic definition would define a group based on how closely related its constituents are. Tetrapoda is widely considered a monophyletic clade, a group with all of its component taxa sharing a single common ancestor. In this sense, Tetrapoda can also be defined as the "clade of limbed vertebrates", including all vertebrates descended from the first limbed vertebrates.

=== Crown group tetrapods ===
A simplified cladogram demonstrating differing definitions of Tetrapoda: * Under the apomorphy-based definition used by many paleontologists, tetrapods originate at the orange star ("First vertebrates with tetrapod limb") * When restricted to the crown group, tetrapods originate at the "last common ancestor of recent tetrapods"

A portion of tetrapod scientists, led by French paleontologist Michel Laurin, prefer to restrict the definition of tetrapod to the crown group. A crown group is a subset of a category of animal defined by the most recent common ancestor of living representatives. This cladistic approach defines "tetrapods" as the nearest common ancestor of all living amphibians (the lissamphibians) and all living amniotes (reptiles, birds, and mammals), along with all of the descendants of that ancestor. In effect, "tetrapod" is a name reserved solely for animals which lie among living tetrapods, so-called crown tetrapods. This is a node-based clade, a group with a common ancestry descended from a single "node" (the node being the nearest common ancestor of living species).

Defining tetrapods based on the crown group would exclude many four-limbed vertebrates which would otherwise be defined as tetrapods. Devonian "tetrapods", such as Ichthyostega and Acanthostega, certainly evolved prior to the split between lissamphibians and amniotes, and thus lie outside the crown group. They would instead lie along the stem group, a subset of animals related to, but not within, the crown group. The stem and crown group together are combined into the total group, given the name Tetrapodomorpha, which refers to all animals closer to living tetrapods than to Dipnoi (lungfishes), the next closest group of living animals. Many early tetrapodomorphs are clearly fish in ecology and anatomy, but later tetrapodomorphs are much more similar to tetrapods in many regards, such as the presence of limbs and digits.

Laurin's approach to the definition of tetrapods is rooted in the belief that the term has more relevance for neontologists (an informal term used for biologists specializing in living organisms) than paleontologists (who primarily use the apomorphy-based definition). In 1998, he re-established the defunct historical term Stegocephali to replace the apomorphy-based definition of tetrapod used by many authors. Other paleontologists use the term stem-tetrapod to refer to those tetrapod-like vertebrates that are not members of the crown group, including both early limbed "tetrapods" and tetrapodomorph fishes. The term "fishapod" was popularized after the discovery and 2006 publication of Tiktaalik, an advanced tetrapodomorph fish which was closely related to limbed vertebrates and showed many apparently transitional traits.

The two subclades of crown tetrapods are Batrachomorpha and Reptiliomorpha. Batrachomorphs are all animals sharing a more recent common ancestry with living amphibians than with living amniotes (reptiles, birds, and mammals). Reptiliomorphs are all animals sharing a more recent common ancestry with living amniotes than with living amphibians. Gaffney (1979) provided the name Neotetrapoda to the crown group of tetrapods, though few subsequent authors followed this proposal.

The earliest fossils attributed to crown-group tetrapods are clawed footprints from the earliest Carboniferous (Tournaisian) Snowy Plains Formation of Australia, which were claimed to belong to early amniotes or potentially even sauropsids. However, their identification as amniote prints entirely relies on the presence of claws, which these authors argued was distinctive to amniotes. However, the presence of claws in Westlothiana (once hailed as the earliest reptile, but now considered a stem-tetrapod less closely related to amniotes than modern amphibians are) suggests that claws cannot be considered a distinctive characteristic of amniotes, and thus their presence in the footprints cannot be used to date the timing of amniote or crown-tetrapod origin. Prior to the discovery of these prints, the earliest evidence of crown-group tetrapods were temnospondyl footprints from slightly later in the Tournaisian, with the earliest body fossils being of the temnospondyl Balanerpeton from the Viséan.

== Biodiversity ==
Tetrapoda includes the four traditional living classes: amphibians, reptiles, birds and mammals. Overall, the biodiversity of lissamphibians, as well as of tetrapods generally, has grown exponentially over time; the more than 30,000 species living today are descended from a single amphibian group in the Early to Middle Devonian. However, that diversification process was interrupted at least a few times by major biological crises, such as the Permian–Triassic extinction event, which at least affected amniotes.

The overall composition of biodiversity was driven primarily by amphibians in the Palaeozoic, dominated by reptiles in the Mesozoic and expanded by the explosive growth of birds and mammals in the Cenozoic. As biodiversity has grown, so has the number of species and the number of niches that tetrapods have occupied. The first tetrapods were aquatic and fed primarily on fish. Today, the Earth supports a great diversity of tetrapods that live in many habitats and subsist on a variety of diets. The following table shows summary estimates for each tetrapod class from the IUCN Red List of Threatened Species, 2014.3, for the number of extant species that have been described in the literature, as well as the number of threatened species.

IUCN global summary estimates for extant tetrapod species as of 2023
Tetrapod group	Image	Class	Estimated number of described species (Note: The estimates for amphibians, reptiles, birds and mammals were respectively taken from Amphibian Species of the World: An Online Reference (version 6.2, 1 December 2023), the Reptile Database (accessed: 0 December 2023), Handbook of the Birds of the World and BirdLife International digital checklist of the birds of the world (version 8; accessed: 11 December 2023) and the Mammal Diversity Database (version 1.11, released 15 April 2023; accessed 01 December 2023).)	Number of species evaluated for Red List	Share of described species evaluated for Red List	Threatened species in Red List	Best estimate of percent of threatened species
Anamniotes lay eggs in water		Amphibians	8,707	8,020	92%	2,876	41%
Amniotes adapted to lay eggs on land		Reptiles	12,060	10,254	85%	1,848	21%
Amniotes adapted to lay eggs on land		Birds	11,197	11,197	100%	1,354	12%
Amniotes adapted to lay eggs on land		Mammal	6,631	5,980	90%	1,339	26%
Overall			38,595	35,451	92%	7,417	

== Classification ==
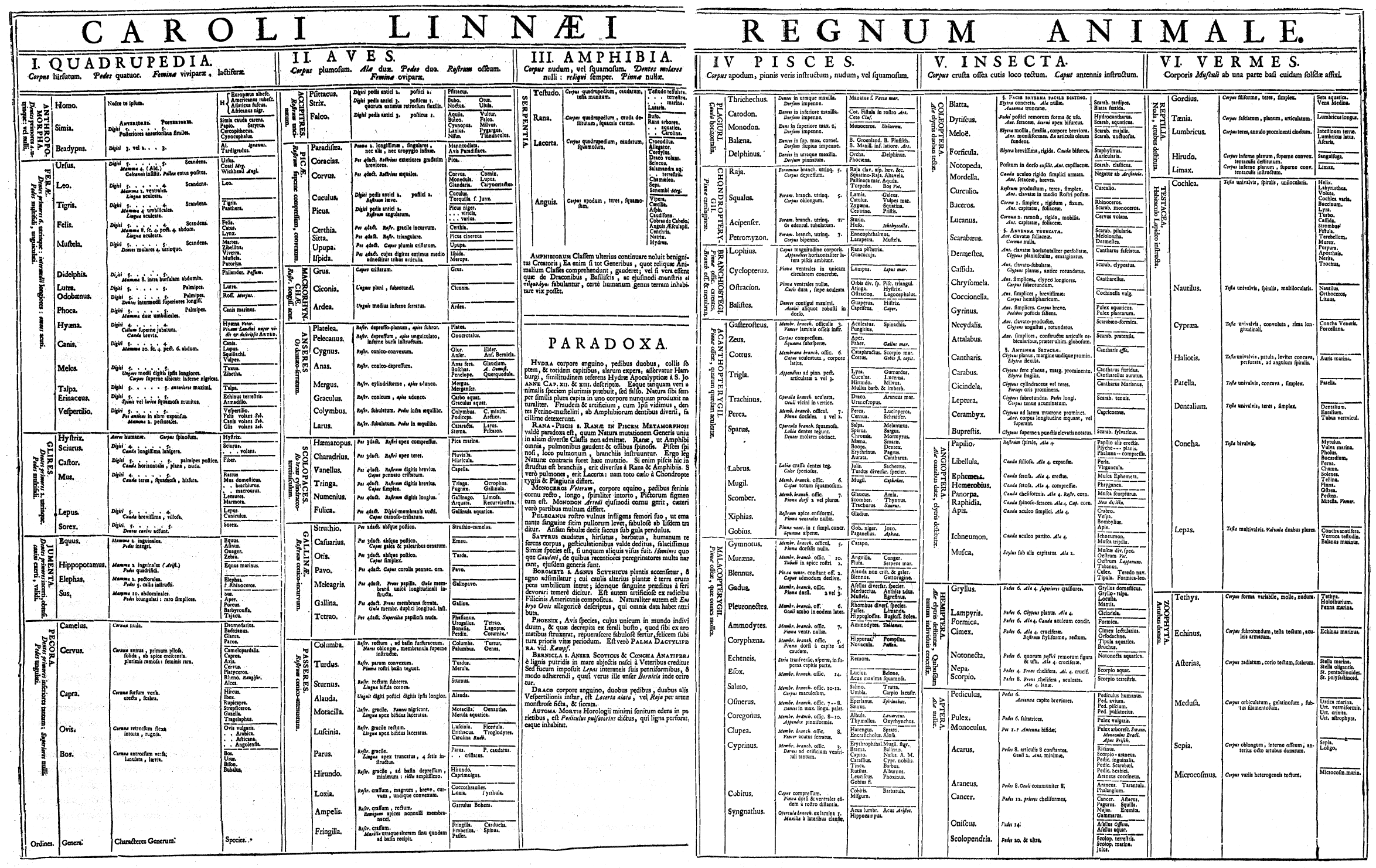
Carl Linnaeus's 1735 classification of animals, with tetrapods occupying the first three classes

The classification of tetrapods has a long history. Traditionally, tetrapods are divided into four classes based on gross anatomical and physiological traits. Snakes and other legless reptiles are considered tetrapods because they are sufficiently like other reptiles that have a full complement of limbs. Similar considerations apply to caecilians and aquatic mammals. Newer taxonomy is frequently based on cladistics instead, giving a variable number of major "branches" (clades) of the tetrapod family tree.

As is the case throughout evolutionary biology today, there is debate over how to properly classify the groups within Tetrapoda. Traditional biological classification sometimes fails to recognize evolutionary transitions between older groups and descendant groups with markedly different characteristics. For example, the birds, which evolved from the dinosaurs, are defined as a separate group from them, because they represent a distinct new type of physical form and functionality. In phylogenetic nomenclature, in contrast, the newer group is always included in the old. For this school of taxonomy, dinosaurs and birds are not groups in contrast to each other, but rather birds are a sub-type of dinosaurs.

=== History of classification ===
The tetrapods, including all large- and medium-sized land animals, have been among the best understood animals since earliest times. By Aristotle's time, the basic division between mammals, birds and egg-laying tetrapods (the "herptiles") was well known, and the inclusion of the legless snakes into this group was likewise recognized. With the birth of modern biological classification in the 18th century, Linnaeus used the same division, with the tetrapods occupying the first three of his six classes of animals. While reptiles and amphibians can be quite similar externally, the French zoologist Pierre André Latreille recognized the large physiological differences at the beginning of the 19th century and split the herptiles into two classes, giving the four familiar classes of tetrapods: amphibians, reptiles, birds and mammals.

=== Classical classification ===
With the basic classification of tetrapods settled, a half a century followed where the classification of living and fossil groups was predominantly done by experts working within classes. In the early 1930s, American vertebrate palaeontologist Alfred Romer (1894–1973) produced an overview, drawing together taxonomic work from the various subfields to create an orderly taxonomy in his Vertebrate Paleontology. This classical scheme with minor variations is still used in works where systematic overview is essential, e.g. Benton (1998) and Knobill and Neill (2006). While mostly seen in general works, it is also still used in some specialist works like Fortuny et al. (2011). The taxonomy down to subclass level shown here is from Hildebrand and Goslow (2001):

- Superclass Tetrapoda – four-limbed vertebrates
  - Class Amphibia – amphibians
    - Subclass Ichthyostegalia – early fish-like amphibians (paraphyletic group outside leading to the crown-clade Neotetrapoda)
    - Subclass Anthracosauria – reptile-like amphibians (often thought to be the ancestors of the amniotes)
    - Subclass Temnospondyli – large-headed Paleozoic and Mesozoic amphibians
    - Subclass Lissamphibia – modern amphibians
  - Class Reptilia – reptiles
    - Subclass Diapsida – diapsids, including crocodiles, dinosaurs, birds, lizards, snakes and turtles
    - Subclass Euryapsida – euryapsids
    - Subclass Synapsida – synapsids, including mammal-like reptiles-now a separate group (often thought to be the ancestors of mammals)
    - Subclass Anapsida – anapsids
  - Class Mammalia – mammals
    - Subclass Prototheria – egg-laying mammals, including monotremes
    - Subclass Allotheria – multituberculates
    - Subclass Theria – live-bearing mammals, including marsupials and placentals

This classification is the one most commonly encountered in school textbooks and popular works. While orderly and easy to use, it has come under critique from cladistics. The earliest tetrapods are grouped under class Amphibia, although several of the groups are more closely related to amniotes than to modern day amphibians. Traditionally, birds are not considered a type of reptile, but crocodiles are more closely related to birds than they are to other reptiles, such as lizards. Birds themselves are thought to be descendants of theropod dinosaurs. Basal non-mammalian synapsids ("mammal-like reptiles") traditionally also sort under class Reptilia as a separate subclass, but they are more closely related to mammals than to living reptiles. Considerations like these have led some authors to argue for a new classification based purely on phylogeny, disregarding the anatomy and physiology.

== Evolution ==
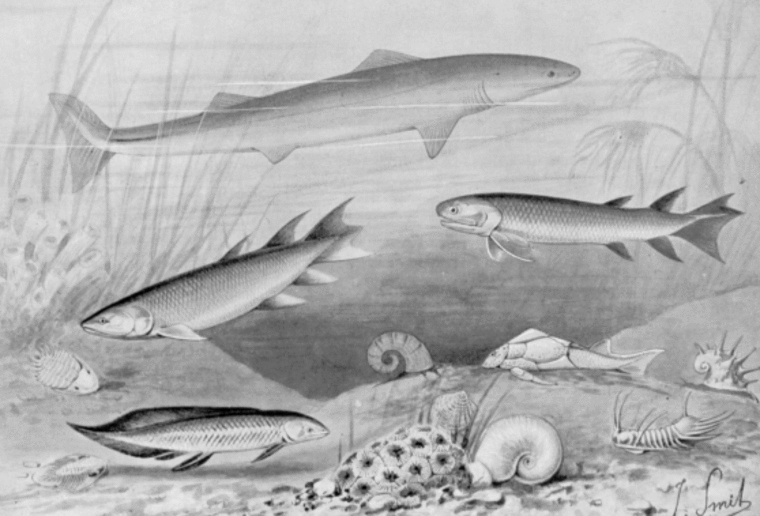
Devonian fishes, including an early shark Cladoselache, Eusthenopteron and other lobe-finned fishes, and the placoderm Bothriolepis (Joseph Smit, 1905).

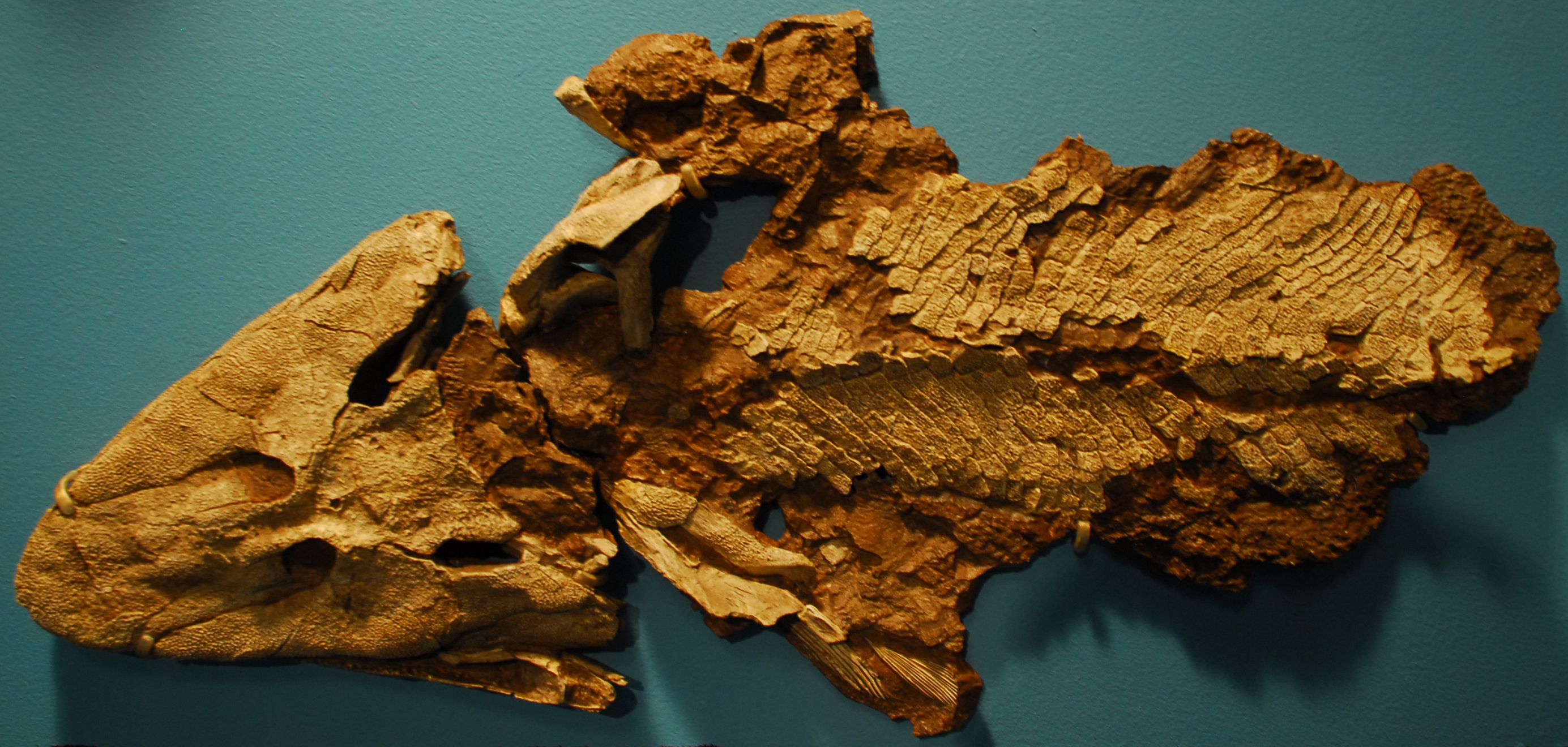
Fossil of Tiktaalik

Tetrapods evolved from early bony fishes (Osteichthyes), specifically from the tetrapodomorph branch of lobe-finned fishes (Sarcopterygii), living in the early to middle Devonian period.

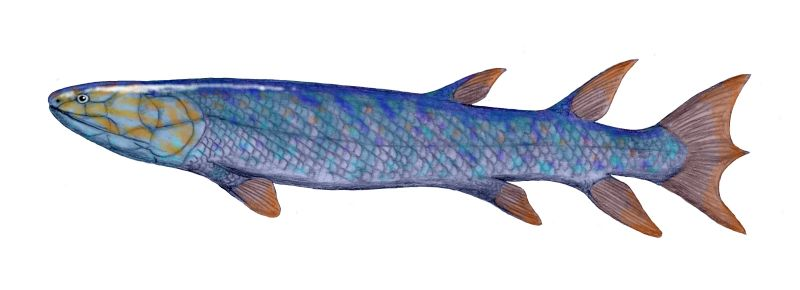
Eusthenopteron, ≈385 Ma

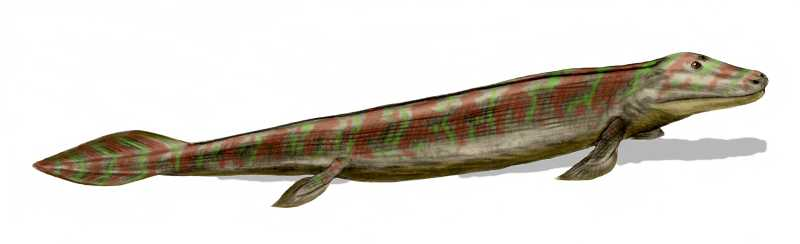
Tiktaalik, ≈375 Ma

Acanthostega, ≈365 Ma

The first tetrapods probably evolved in the Emsian stage of the Early Devonian from Tetrapodomorph fish living in shallow water environments. The very earliest tetrapods would have been animals similar to Acanthostega, with legs and lungs as well as gills, but still primarily aquatic and unsuited to life on land.

The earliest tetrapods inhabited saltwater, brackish-water, and freshwater environments, as well as environments of highly variable salinity. These traits were shared with many early lobed-finned fishes. As early tetrapods are found on two Devonian continents, Laurasia and Gondwana, as well as the island of North China, it is widely supposed that early tetrapods were capable of swimming across the shallow (and relatively narrow) continental-shelf seas that separated these landmasses.

Since the early 20th century, several families of tetrapodomorph fishes have been proposed as the nearest relatives of tetrapods, among them the rhizodonts (notably Sauripterus), the osteolepidids, the tristichopterids (notably Eusthenopteron), and more recently the elpistostegalians (also known as Panderichthyida) notably the genus Tiktaalik.

A notable feature of Tiktaalik is the absence of bones covering the gills. These bones would otherwise connect the shoulder girdle with skull, making the shoulder girdle part of the skull. With the loss of the gill-covering bones, the shoulder girdle is separated from the skull, connected to the torso by muscle and other soft-tissue connections. The result is the appearance of the neck. This feature appears only in tetrapods and Tiktaalik, not other tetrapodomorph fishes. Tiktaalik also had a pattern of bones in the skull roof (upper half of the skull) that is similar to the end-Devonian tetrapod Ichthyostega. The two also shared a semi-rigid ribcage of overlapping ribs, which may have substituted for a rigid spine. In conjunction with robust forelimbs and shoulder girdle, both Tiktaalik and Ichthyostega may have had the ability to locomote on land in the manner of a seal, with the forward portion of the torso elevated, the hind part dragging behind. Finally, Tiktaalik fin bones are somewhat similar to the limb bones of tetrapods.

However, there are issues with positing Tiktaalik as a tetrapod ancestor. For example, it had a long spine with far more vertebrae than any known tetrapod or other tetrapodomorph fish. Also the oldest tetrapod trace fossils (tracks and trackways) predate it by a considerable margin. Several hypotheses have been proposed to explain this date discrepancy: 1) The nearest common ancestor of tetrapods and Tiktaalik dates to the Early Devonian. By this hypothesis, the lineage is the closest to tetrapods, but Tiktaalik itself was a late-surviving relic. 2) Tiktaalik represents a case of parallel evolution. 3) Tetrapods evolved more than once.

- Euteleostomi / Osteichthyes (bony vertebrates)
  - Actinopterygii (ray‑finned fishes)
  - Sarcopterygii (fleshy‑limbed vertebrates)
    - Actinistia
      Coelacanthiformes (coelacanths)
    - Rhipidistia
      - Dipnomorpha
        Dipnoi (lungfish)
      - Tetrapodomorpha
        - †Tetrapodomorph fishes
        - Tetrapoda

== History ==
=== Palaeozoic ===
==== Devonian stem-tetrapods ====
The oldest evidence for the existence of tetrapods comes from trace fossils: tracks (footprints) and trackways found in Zachełmie, Poland, dated to the Eifelian stage of the Middle Devonian, 390 million years ago, although these traces have also been interpreted as the ichnogenus Piscichnus (fish nests/feeding traces). The adult tetrapods had an estimated length of 2.5 m (8 feet), and lived in a lagoon with an average depth of 1–2 m, although it is not known at what depth the underwater tracks were made. The lagoon was inhabited by a variety of marine organisms and was apparently salt water. The average water temperature was 30 degrees C (86 F). The second oldest evidence for tetrapods, also tracks and trackways, date from ca. 385 Mya (Valentia Island, Ireland).

The oldest partial fossils of tetrapods date from the Frasnian beginning ≈380 mya. These include Elginerpeton and Obruchevichthys. Some paleontologists dispute their status as true (digit-bearing) tetrapods.

All known forms of Frasnian tetrapods became extinct in the Late Devonian extinction, also known as the end-Frasnian extinction. This marked the beginning of a gap in the tetrapod fossil record known as the Famennian gap, occupying roughly the first half of the Famennian stage.

The oldest near-complete tetrapod fossils, Acanthostega and Ichthyostega, date from the second half of the Fammennian. Although both were essentially four-footed fish, Ichthyostega is the earliest known tetrapod that may have had the ability to pull itself onto land and drag itself forward with its forelimbs. There is no evidence that it did so, only that it may have been anatomically capable of doing so.

The publication in 2018 of Tutusius umlambo and Umzantsia amazana from high latitude Gondwana setting indicate that the tetrapods enjoyed a global distribution by the end of the Devonian and even extended into the high latitudes.

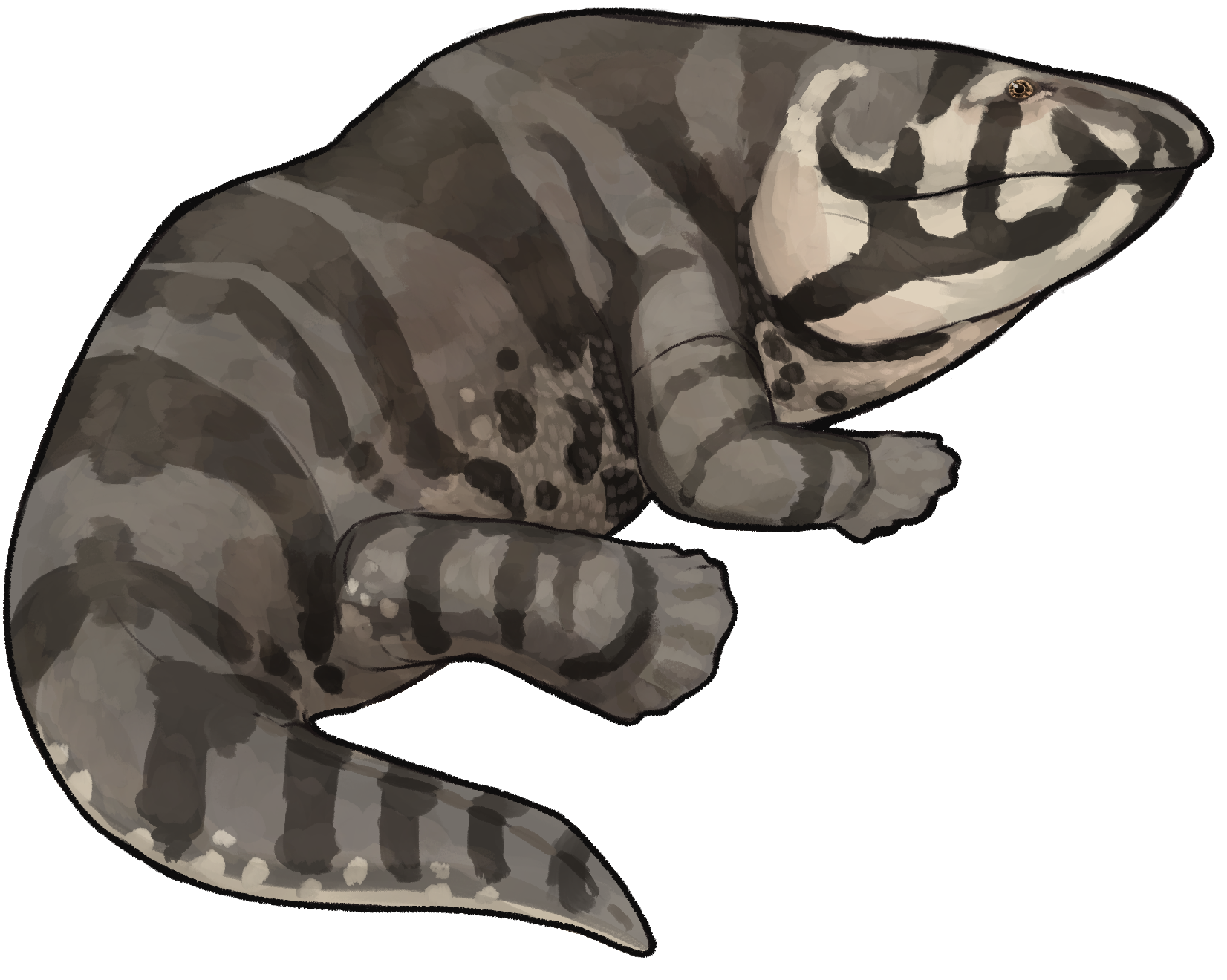
Ichthyostega (a four-limbed stem-tetrapod, Late Devonian)

The end-Fammenian marked another extinction, known as the end-Fammenian extinction or the Hangenberg event, which is followed by another gap in the tetrapod fossil record, Romer's gap, also known as the Tournaisian gap. This gap, which was initially 30 million years, but has been gradually reduced over time, currently occupies much of the 13.9-million year Tournaisian, the first stage of the Carboniferous period. Tetrapod-like vertebrates first appeared in the Early Devonian period, and species with limbs and digits were around by the Late Devonian. These early "stem-tetrapods" included animals such as Ichthyostega, with legs and lungs as well as gills, but still primarily aquatic and poorly adapted for life on land. The Devonian stem-tetrapods went through two major population bottlenecks during the Late Devonian extinctions, also known as the end-Frasnian and end-Fammenian extinctions. These extinction events led to the disappearance of stem-tetrapods with fish-like features. When stem-tetrapods reappear in the fossil record in early Carboniferous deposits, some 10 million years later, the adult forms of some are somewhat adapted to a terrestrial existence. Why they went to land in the first place is still debated.

==== Carboniferous ====
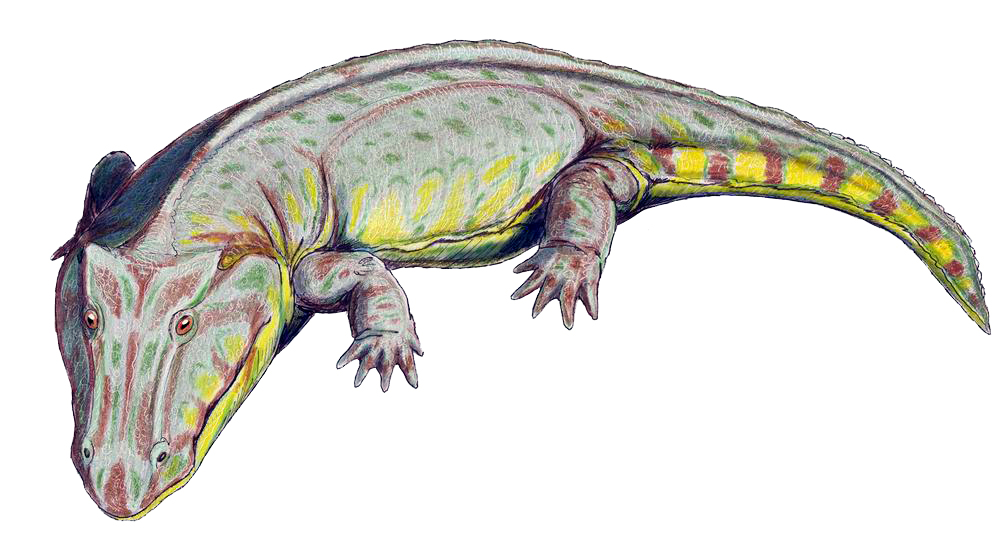
Edops (an early temnospondyl, Late Carboniferous - Early Permian)

During the early Carboniferous, the number of digits on hands and feet of stem-tetrapods became standardized at no more than five, as lineages with more digits died out (exceptions within crown-group tetrapods arose among some secondarily aquatic members). By the very beginning of the Carboniferous, the stem-tetrapods had radiated into two branches of true ("crown group") tetrapods, one ancestral to modern amphibians and the other ancestral to amniotes.

Modern amphibians are most likely derived from the temnospondyls, a particularly diverse and long-lasting group of tetrapods. A less popular proposal draws comparisons to the "lepospondyls", an eclectic mixture of various small tetrapods, including burrowing, limbless, and other bizarrely-shaped forms. The reptiliomorphs (sometimes known as "anthracosaurs") were the relatives and ancestors of the amniotes (reptiles, mammals, and kin). The first amniotes are known from the early part of the Late Carboniferous. All basal amniotes had a small body size, like many of their contemporaries, though some Carboniferous tetrapods evolved into large crocodile-like predators, informally known as "labyrinthodonts". Amphibians must return to water to lay eggs; in contrast, amniote eggs have a membrane ensuring gas exchange out of water and can therefore be laid on land.

Amphibians and amniotes were affected by the Carboniferous rainforest collapse (CRC), an extinction event that occurred around 307 million years ago. The sudden collapse of a vital ecosystem shifted the diversity and abundance of major groups. Amniotes and temnospondyls in particular were more suited to the new conditions. They invaded new ecological niches and began diversifying their diets to include plants and other tetrapods, previously having been limited to insects and fish.

==== Permian ====
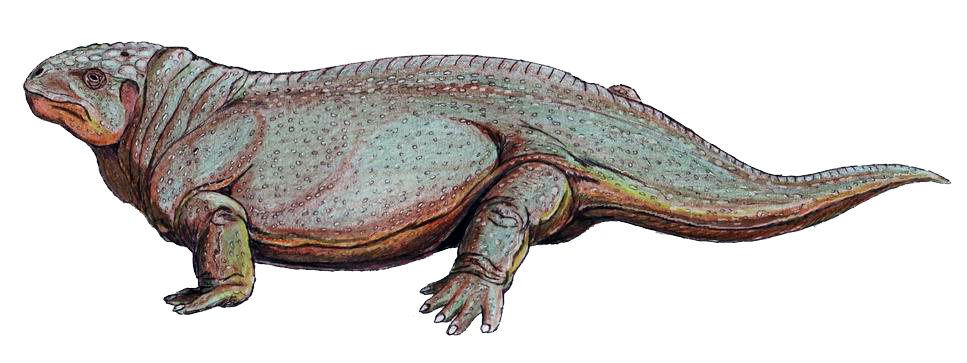
Diadectes (a terrestrial diadectomorph, Early Permian)

In the Permian period, amniotes became particularly well-established, and two important clades filled in most terrestrial niches: the sauropsids and the synapsids. The latter were the most important and successful Permian land animals, establishing complex terrestrial ecosystems of predators and prey while acquiring various adaptations retained by their modern descendants, the mammals. Sauropsid diversity was more subdued during the Permian, but they did begin to fracture into several lineages ancestral to modern reptiles. Amniotes were not the only tetrapods to experiment with prolonged life on land. Some temnospondyls, seymouriamorphs, and diadectomorphs also successfully filled terrestrial niches in the earlier part of the Permian. Non-amniote tetrapods declined in the later part of the Permian.

The end of the Permian saw a major turnover in fauna during the Permian–Triassic extinction event. There was a protracted loss of species, due to multiple extinction pulses. Many of the once large and diverse groups died out or were greatly reduced.

=== Mesozoic ===
The diapsid reptiles (a subgroup of the sauropsids) strongly diversified during the Triassic, giving rise to the turtles, pseudosuchians (crocodilian ancestors), dinosaurs, pterosaurs, and lepidosaurs, along with many other reptile groups on land and sea. Some of the new Triassic reptiles would not survive into the Jurassic, but others would flourish during the Jurassic. Lizards, turtles, dinosaurs, pterosaurs, crocodylomorphs, and plesiosaurs were particular beneficiaries of the Triassic-Jurassic transition. Birds, a particular subset of theropod dinosaurs capable of flight via feathered wings, evolved in the Late Jurassic. In the Cretaceous, snakes developed from lizards, rhynchocephalians (tuataras and kin) declined, and modern birds and crocodilians started to establish themselves.

Among the characteristic Paleozoic non-amniote tetrapods, few survived into the Mesozoic. Temnospondyls briefly recovered in the Triassic, spawning the large aquatic stereospondyls and the small terrestrial lissamphibians (the earliest frogs, salamanders, and caecilians). However, stereospondyl diversity would crash at the end of the Triassic. By the Late Cretaceous, the only surviving amphibians were lissamphibians. Many groups of synapsids, such as anomodonts and therocephalians, that once comprised the dominant terrestrial fauna of the Permian, also became extinct during the Triassic. During the Jurassic, one synapsid group (Cynodontia) gave rise to the modern mammals, which survived through the rest of the Mesozoic to later diversify during the Cenozoic. The Cretaceous-Paleogene extinction event at the end of the Mesozoic killed off many organisms, including all the non-avian dinosaurs and nearly all marine reptiles. Birds survived and diversified during the Cenozoic, similar to mammals.

=== Cenozoic ===
Following the great extinction event at the end of the Mesozoic, representatives of seven major groups of tetrapods persisted into the Cenozoic era. One of them, a group of semiaquatic reptiles known as the Choristodera, became extinct 11 million years ago for unclear reasons. The seven Cenozoic tetrapods groups are:

- Lissamphibia: frogs, salamanders, and caecilians
- Mammalia: monotremes, marsupials, placentals, and †multituberculates
- Lepidosauria: tuataras and lizards (including amphisbaenians and snakes)
- Testudines: turtles
- Crocodilia: crocodiles, alligators, caimans and gharials
- Aves: birds
- †Choristodera (extinct)

== Phylogeny ==
=== Stem group ===
Stem tetrapods are all animals more closely related to tetrapods than to lungfish, but excluding the tetrapod crown group. The cladogram below illustrates the relationships of stem-tetrapods. All these lineages are extinct except for Dipnomorpha and Tetrapoda; from Swartz, 2012:

- Rhipidistia
  - Dipnomorpha (lungfishes and relatives)
  - Tetrapodomorpha
    - †Kenichthys
    - - †Rhizodontidae
      - - †Canowindridae
          - †Marsdenichthys
          - - †Canowindra
            - - †Koharalepis
              - †Beelarongia
        - - †Megalichthyiformes
            - †Gogonasus
            - - †Gyroptychius
              - - †Osteolepis
                - - †Medoevia
                  - †Megalichthyidae
          - Eotetrapodiformes
            - †Tristichopteridae
              - †Spodichthys
              - - †Tristichopterus
                - - †Eusthenopteron
                  - - †Jarvikina
                    - - †Cabbonichthys
                      - - †Mandageria
                        - †Eusthenodon
            - - †Tinirau
              - - †Platycephalichthys
                - Elpistostegalia
                  - †Panderichthys
                  - Stegocephalia
                    - - †Tiktaalik
                      - †Elpistostege
                    - - †Elginerpeton
                      - - †Ventastega
                        - - †Acanthostega
                          - - †Ichthyostega
                            - - †Whatcheeriidae
                              - - †Colosteidae
                                - - †Crassigyrinus
                                  - - †Baphetidae
                                    - Tetrapoda

The following cladogram represents the results of Igielman (2026):

- Tetrapodomorpha
  - †Eusthenopteron
  - - †Tiktaalik
    - limbs present
      - †Ichthyostega
      - - †Acanthostega
        - - †Whatcheeriidae
          - - †Embolomeri
            - †Colosteidae
            - - †Westlothiana
              - †Aistopoda
            - - †Baphetoidea
              - crown-group Tetrapoda
                - Temnospondyli (including Lissamphibia, i.e. modern amphibians)
                - - †Seymouriamorpha
                  - - †Recumbirostra
                    - - †Diadectomorpha
                      - - †Captorhinidae
                        - Amniota (including modern mammals, reptiles and birds)

=== Crown group ===
Crown tetrapods are defined as the nearest common ancestor of all living tetrapods (amphibians, reptiles, birds, and mammals) along with all of the descendants of that ancestor.

The inclusion of certain extinct groups in the crown Tetrapoda depends on the relationships of modern amphibians, or lissamphibians. There are currently three major hypotheses on the origins of lissamphibians. In the temnospondyl hypothesis (TH), lissamphibians are most closely related to dissorophoid temnospondyls, which would make temnospondyls tetrapods. In the lepospondyl hypothesis (LH), lissamphibians are the sister taxon of lysorophian lepospondyls, making lepospondyls tetrapods and temnospondyls stem-tetrapods. In the polyphyletic hypothesis (PH), frogs and salamanders evolved from dissorophoid temnospondyls while caecilians come out of microsaur lepospondyls, making both lepospondyls and temnospondyls true tetrapods.

=== Origins of modern amphibians ===
==== Temnospondyl hypothesis (TH) ====
This hypothesis comes in a number of variants, most of which have lissamphibians coming out of the dissorophoid temnospondyls, usually with the focus on amphibamids and branchiosaurids.

The temnospondyl hypothesis is the currently favored or majority view, supported by Ruta et al (2003a,b), Ruta and Coates (2007), Coates et al (2008), Sigurdsen and Green (2011), and Schoch (2013, 2014).

Cladogram modified after Coates, Ruta and Friedman (2008).

- Crown-group Tetrapoda
  - - Temnospondyli
      Crown group Lissamphibia
  - - † Embolomeri
    - - † Gephyrostegidae
      - - † Seymouriamorpha
        - - - † Microsauria
            - - † Lysorophia
              - - † Adelospondyli
                - - † Aistopoda
                  - † Nectridea
          - - † Diadectomorpha
            - Crown-group Amniota

==== Lepospondyl hypothesis (LH) ====
Cladogram modified after Laurin, How Vertebrates Left the Water (2010).

- Stegocephalia ("Tetrapoda")
  - - - † Acanthostega
  - - - † Ichthyostega
  - - - † Temnospondyli
    - - † Embolomeri
      - - † Seymouriamorpha
        - - Amphibia
            - - † Adelogyrinidae
              - † Aistopoda
            - - - † Nectridea
              - - † Lysorophia
                - - Lissamphibia
          - Reptiliomorpha
            - † Diadectomorpha
            - Amniota

==== Polyphyly hypothesis (PH) ====
This hypothesis has batrachians (frogs and salamanders) coming out of dissorophoid temnospondyls, with caecilians out of microsaur lepospondyls. There are two variants, one developed by Carroll, the other by Anderson.

Cladogram modified after Schoch, Frobisch, (2009).

- Tetrapoda
  - stem tetrapods
  - - - Temnospondyli
        - basal temnospondyls
        - Dissorophoidea
          - - † Amphibamidae
            - Frogs
          - - † Branchiosauridae
            - Salamanders
      - - Lepospondyli
          - † Lysorophia
          - - † Microsauria
            - Caecilians
    - - - † Seymouriamorpha
        - - † Diadectomorpha
          - Amniota

== Anatomy and physiology ==
The tetrapod's ancestral fish, tetrapodomorph, possessed similar traits to those inherited by the early tetrapods, including internal nostrils and large, fleshy pectoral and pelvic fins built on bones that could give rise to the tetrapod limb. To propagate in the terrestrial environment, animals had to overcome certain challenges. Their bodies needed additional support, because buoyancy was no longer a factor. Water retention was now important, since it was no longer the living matrix, and could be lost easily to the environment. Finally, animals needed new sensory input systems to have any ability to function reasonably on land.

=== Skull ===
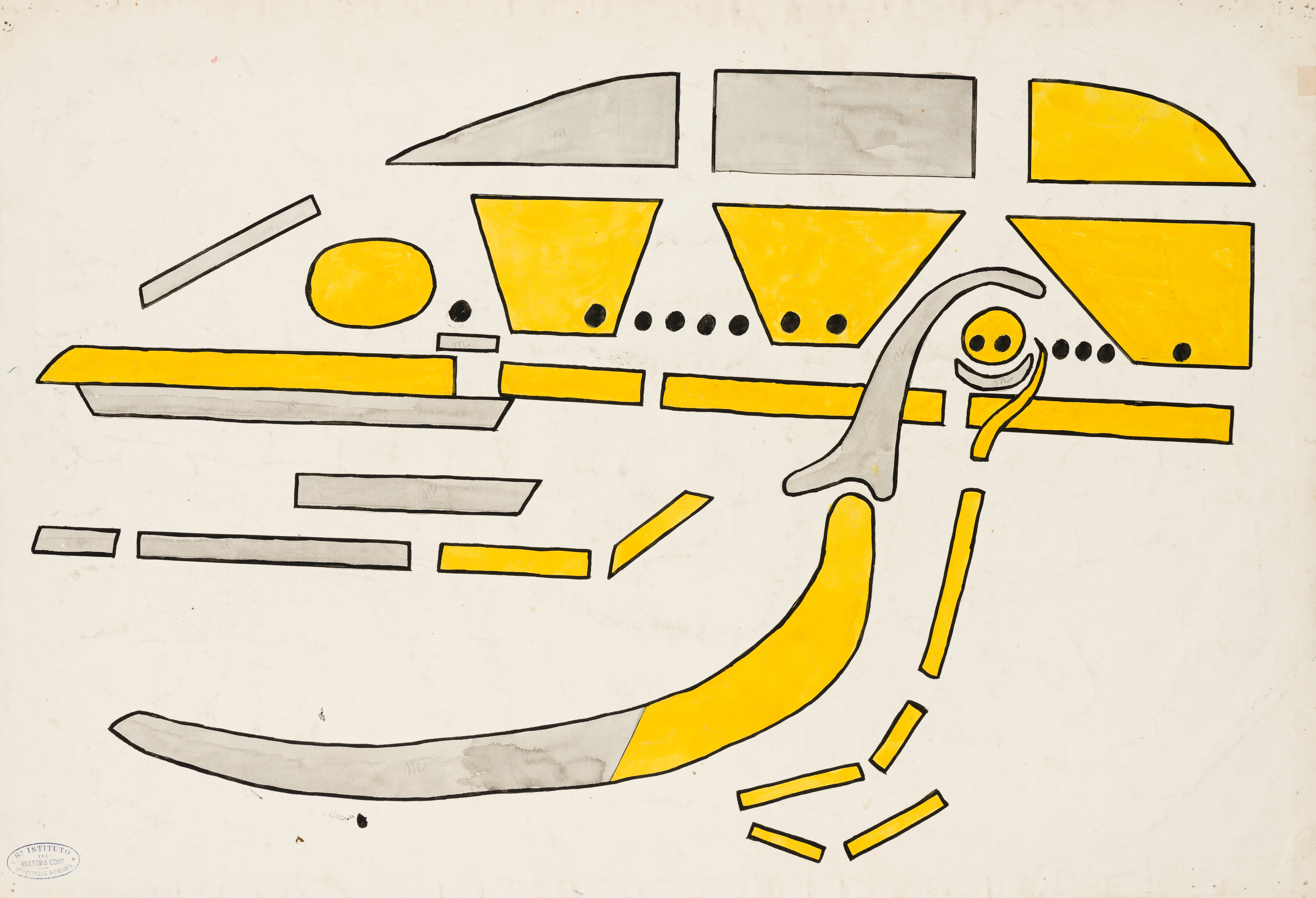
Schematic skull of a tetrapod

The brain only filled half of the skull in the early tetrapods. The rest was filled with fatty tissue or fluid, which gave the brain space for growth as they adapted to a life on land. The palatal and jaw structures of tetramorphs were similar to those of early tetrapods, and their dentition was similar too, with labyrinthine teeth fitting in a pit-and-tooth arrangement on the palate.

A major difference between early tetrapodomorph fishes and early tetrapods was in the relative development of the front and back skull portions; the snout is much less developed than in most early tetrapods and the post-orbital skull is exceptionally longer than an amphibian's. A notable characteristic that make a tetrapod's skull different from a fish's are the relative frontal and rear portion lengths. The fish had a long rear portion while the front was short; the orbital vacuities were thus located towards the anterior end. In the tetrapod, the front of the skull lengthened, positioning the orbits farther back on the skull.

=== Neck ===
In tetrapodomorph fishes such as Eusthenopteron, the part of the body that would later become the neck was covered by a number of gill-covering bones known as the opercular series. These bones functioned as part of pump mechanism for forcing water through the mouth and past the gills. When the mouth opened to take in water, the gill flaps closed (including the gill-covering bones), thus ensuring that water entered only through the mouth. When the mouth closed, the gill flaps opened and water was forced through the gills.

In Acanthostega, a basal tetrapod, the gill-covering bones have disappeared, although the underlying gill arches are still present. Besides the opercular series, Acanthostega also lost the throat-covering bones (gular series). The opercular series and gular series combined are sometimes known as the operculo-gular or operculogular series. Other bones in the neck region lost in Acanthostega (and later tetrapods) include the extrascapular series and the supracleithral series. Both sets of bones connect the shoulder girdle to the skull. With the loss of these bones, tetrapods acquired a neck, allowing the head to rotate somewhat independently of the torso. This, in turn, required stronger soft-tissue connections between head and torso, including muscles and ligaments connecting the skull with the spine and shoulder girdle. Bones and groups of bones were also consolidated and strengthened.

In Carboniferous tetrapods, the neck joint (occiput) provided a pivot point for the spine against the back of the skull. In tetrapodomorph fishes such as Eusthenopteron, no such neck joint existed. Instead, the notochord (a rod made of proto-cartilage) entered a hole in the back of the braincase and continued to the middle of the braincase. Acanthostega had the same arrangement as Eusthenopteron, and thus no neck joint. The neck joint evolved independently in different lineages of early tetrapods.

All tetrapods appear to hold their necks at the maximum possible vertical extension when in a normal, alert posture.

=== Dentition ===
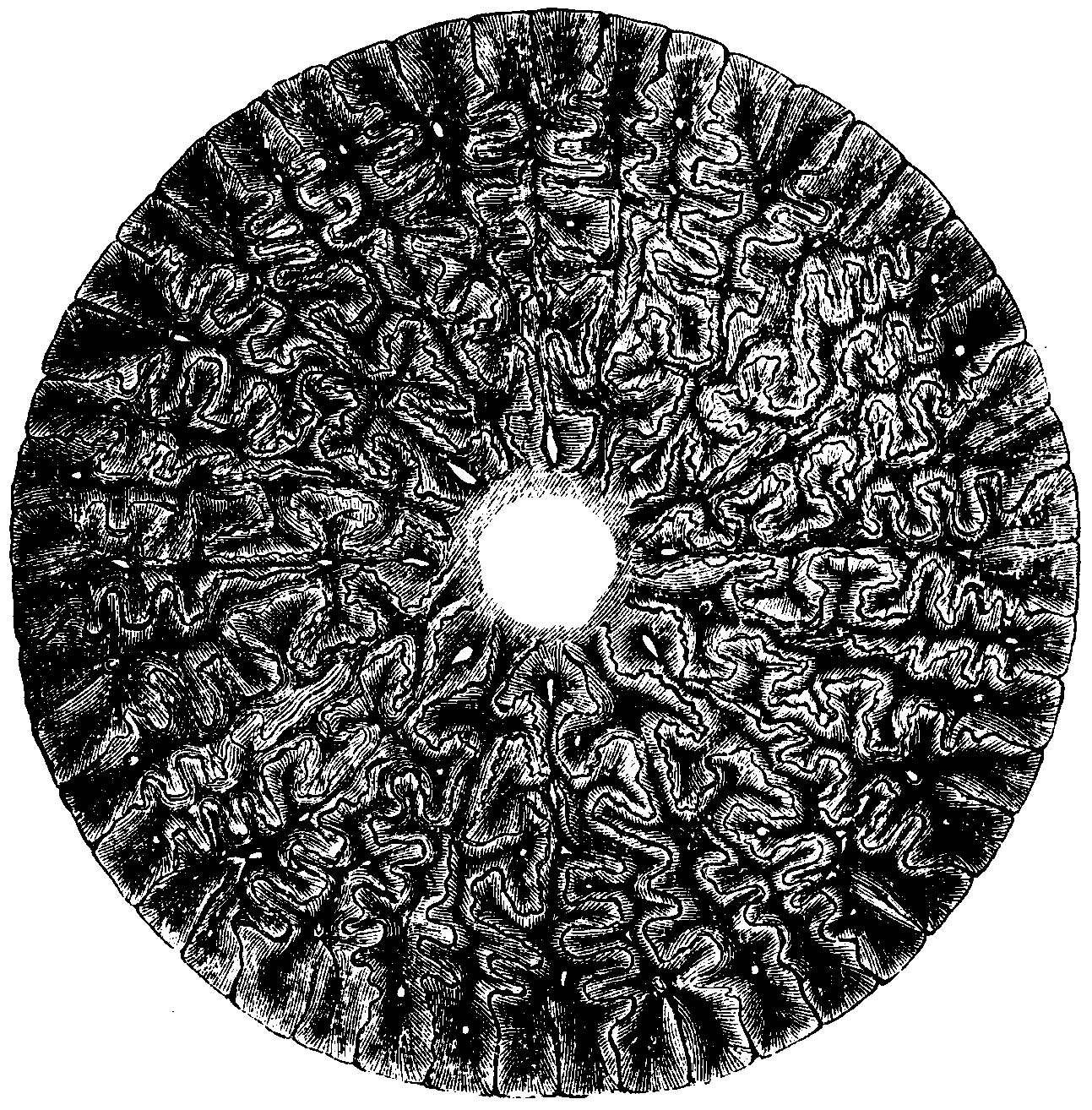
Cross-section of a labyrinthodont tooth

Tetrapods had a tooth structure known as "plicidentine" characterized by infolding of the enamel as seen in cross-section. The more extreme version found in early tetrapods is known as "labyrinthodont" or "labyrinthodont plicidentine".

This type of tooth structure has evolved independently in several types of bony fishes, both ray-finned and lobe finned, some modern lizards, and in a number of tetrapodomorph fishes. The infolding appears to evolve when a fang or large tooth grows in a small jaw, erupting when it is still weak and immature. The infolding provides added strength to the young tooth, but offers little advantage when the tooth is mature. Such teeth are associated with feeding on soft prey in juveniles.

=== Axial skeleton ===
With the move from water to land, the spine had to resist the bending caused by body weight and had to provide mobility where needed. Previously, it could bend along its entire length. Likewise, the paired appendages had not been formerly connected to the spine, but the slowly strengthening limbs now transmitted their support to the axis of the body.

=== Girdles ===
The shoulder girdle was disconnected from the skull, resulting in improved terrestrial locomotion. The early sarcopterygians' cleithrum was retained as the clavicle, and the interclavicle was well-developed, lying on the underside of the chest. In primitive forms, the two clavicles and the interclavical could have grown ventrally in such a way as to form a broad chest plate. The upper portion of the girdle had a flat, scapular blade (shoulder bone), with the glenoid cavity situated below performing as the articulation surface for the humerus, while ventrally there was a large, flat coracoid plate turning in toward the midline.

The pelvic girdle also was much larger than the simple plate found in fishes, accommodating more muscles. It extended far dorsally and was joined to the backbone by one or more specialized sacral ribs. The hind legs were somewhat specialized in that they not only supported weight, but also provided propulsion. The dorsal extension of the pelvis was the ilium, while the broad ventral plate was composed of the pubis in front and the ischium in behind. The three bones met at a single point in the center of the pelvic triangle called the acetabulum, providing a surface of articulation for the femur.

=== Limbs ===
Fleshy lobe-fins supported on bones seem to have been an ancestral trait of all bony fishes (Osteichthyes). The ancestors of the ray-finned fishes (Actinopterygii) evolved their fins in a different direction. The tetrapodomorph ancestors of the tetrapods further developed their lobe fins. The paired fins had bones distinctly homologous to the humerus, ulna, and radius in the fore-fins and to the femur, tibia, and fibula in the pelvic fins.

The paired fins of the early sarcopterygians were smaller than tetrapod limbs, but the skeletal structure was very similar in that the early sarcopterygians had a single proximal bone (analogous to the humerus or femur), two bones in the next segment (forearm or lower leg), and an irregular subdivision of the fin, roughly comparable to the structure of the carpus/tarsus and phalanges of a hand.

=== Locomotion ===
In typical early tetrapod posture, the upper arm and upper leg extended nearly straight horizontal from its body, and the forearm and the lower leg extended downward from the upper segment at a near right angle. The body weight was not centered over the limbs, but was rather transferred 90 degrees outward and down through the lower limbs, which touched the ground. Most of the animal's strength was used to just lift its body off the ground for walking, which was probably slow and difficult. With this sort of posture, it could only make short broad strides. This has been confirmed by fossilized footprints found in Carboniferous rocks.

=== Feeding ===
Early tetrapods had a wide gaping jaw with weak muscles to open and close it. In the jaw were moderate-sized palatal and vomerine (upper) and coronoid (lower) fangs, as well rows of smaller teeth. This was in contrast to the larger fangs and small marginal teeth of earlier tetrapodomorph fishes such as Eusthenopteron. Although this indicates a change in feeding habits, the exact nature of the change in unknown. Some scholars have suggested a change to bottom-feeding or feeding in shallower waters (Ahlberg and Milner 1994). Others have suggesting a mode of feeding comparable to that of the Japanese giant salamander, which uses both suction feeding and direct biting to eat small crustaceans and fish. A study of these jaws shows that they were used for feeding underwater, not on land.

In later terrestrial tetrapods, two methods of jaw closure emerge: static and kinetic inertial (also known as snapping). In the static system, the jaw muscles are arranged in such a way that the jaws have maximum force when shut or nearly shut. In the kinetic inertial system, maximum force is applied when the jaws are wide open, resulting in the jaws snapping shut with great velocity and momentum. Although the kinetic inertial system is occasionally found in fish, it requires special adaptations (such as very narrow jaws) to deal with the high viscosity and density of water, which would otherwise impede rapid jaw closure.

The tetrapod tongue is built from muscles that once controlled gill openings. The tongue is anchored to the hyoid bone, which was once the lower half of a pair of gill bars (the second pair after the ones that evolved into jaws). The tongue did not evolve until the gills began to disappear. Acanthostega still had gills, so this would have been a later development. In an aquatically feeding animals, the food is supported by water and can literally float (or get sucked in) to the mouth. On land, the tongue becomes important.

=== Respiration ===
The evolution of early tetrapod respiration was influenced by an event known as the "charcoal gap", a period of more than 20 million years, in the middle and late Devonian, when atmospheric oxygen levels were too low to sustain wildfires. During this time, fish inhabiting anoxic waters (very low in oxygen) would have been under evolutionary pressure to develop their air-breathing ability.

Early tetrapods probably relied on four methods of respiration: with lungs, with gills, cutaneous respiration (skin breathing), and breathing through the lining of the digestive tract, especially the mouth.

==== Gills ====
The early tetrapod Acanthostega had at least three and probably four pairs of gill bars, each containing deep grooves in the place where one would expect to find the afferent branchial artery. This strongly suggests that functional gills were present. Some aquatic temnospondyls retained internal gills at least into the early Jurassic. Evidence of clear fish-like internal gills is present in Archegosaurus.

==== Lungs ====
Lungs originated as an extra pair of pouches in the throat, behind the gill pouches. They were probably present in the last common ancestor of bony fishes. In some fishes they evolved into swim bladders for maintaining buoyancy. Lungs and swim bladders are homologous (descended from a common ancestral form) as is the case for the pulmonary artery (which delivers de-oxygenated blood from the heart to the lungs) and the arteries that supply swim bladders. Air was introduced into the lungs by a process known as buccal pumping.

In the earliest tetrapods, exhalation was probably accomplished with the aid of the muscles of the torso (the thoracoabdominal region). Inhaling with the ribs was either primitive for amniotes, or evolved independently in at least two different lineages of amniotes. It is not found in amphibians. The muscularized diaphragm is unique to mammals.

==== Recoil aspiration ====
Although tetrapods are widely thought to have inhaled through buccal pumping (mouth pumping), according to an alternative hypothesis, aspiration (inhalation) occurred through passive recoil of the exoskeleton in a manner similar to the contemporary primitive ray-finned fish Polypterus. This fish inhales through its spiracle (blowhole), an anatomical feature present in early tetrapods. Exhalation is powered by muscles in the torso. During exhalation, the bony scales in the upper chest region become indented. When the muscles are relaxed, the bony scales spring back into position, generating considerable negative pressure within the torso, resulting in a very rapid intake of air through the spiracle.

==== Cutaneous respiration ====
Skin breathing, known as cutaneous respiration, is common in fish and amphibians, and occur both in and out of water. In some animals waterproof barriers impede the exchange of gases through the skin. For example, keratin in human skin, the scales of reptiles, and modern proteinaceous fish scales impede the exchange of gases. However, early tetrapods had scales made of highly vascularized bone covered with skin. For this reason, it is thought that early tetrapods could engage some significant amount of skin breathing.

==== Carbon dioxide metabolism ====
Although air-breathing fish can absorb oxygen through their lungs, the lungs tend to be ineffective for discharging carbon dioxide. In tetrapods, the ability of lungs to discharge CO_{2} came about gradually, and was not fully attained until the evolution of amniotes. The same limitation applies to gut air breathing (GUT), i.e., breathing with the lining of the digestive tract. Tetrapod skin would have been effective for both absorbing oxygen and discharging CO_{2}, but only up to a point. For this reason, early tetrapods may have experienced chronic hypercapnia (high levels of blood CO_{2}). This is not uncommon in fish that inhabit waters high in CO_{2}. According to one hypothesis, the "sculpted" or "ornamented" dermal skull roof bones found in early tetrapods may have been related to a mechanism for relieving respiratory acidosis (acidic blood caused by excess CO_{2}) through compensatory metabolic alkalosis.

=== Circulation ===
Early tetrapods probably had a three-chambered heart, as do modern amphibians and lepidosaurian and chelonian reptiles, in which oxygenated blood from the lungs and de-oxygenated blood from the respiring tissues enters by separate atria, and is directed via a spiral valve to the appropriate vessel—aorta for oxygenated blood and pulmonary vein for deoxygenated blood. The spiral valve is essential to keeping the mixing of the two types of blood to a minimum, enabling the animal to have higher metabolic rates, and be more active than otherwise.

=== Senses ===
==== Olfaction ====
The difference in density between air and water causes smells (certain chemical compounds detectable by chemoreceptors) to behave differently. An animal first venturing out onto land would have difficulty in locating such chemical signals if its sensory apparatus had evolved in the context of aquatic detection. The vomeronasal organ also evolved in the nasal cavity for the first time, for detecting pheromones from biological substrates on land, though it was subsequently lost or reduced to vestigial in some lineages, like archosaurs and catarrhines, but expanded in others like lepidosaurs.

==== Lateral line system ====
Fish have a lateral line system that detects pressure fluctuations in the water. Such pressure is non-detectable in air, but grooves for the lateral line sense organs were found on the skull of early tetrapods, suggesting either an aquatic or largely aquatic habitat. Modern amphibians, which are semi-aquatic, exhibit this feature whereas it has been retired by the higher vertebrates.

==== Vision ====
Changes in the eye came about because the behavior of light at the surface of the eye differs between an air and water environment due to the difference in refractive index, so the focal length of the lens altered to function in air. The eye was now exposed to a relatively dry environment rather than being bathed by water, so eyelids developed and tear ducts evolved to produce a liquid to moisten the eyeball.

Early tetrapods inherited a set of five rod and cone opsins known as the vertebrate opsins.

Four cone opsins were present in the first vertebrate, inherited from invertebrate ancestors:

- LWS/MWS (long- to medium-wave sensitive) - green, yellow, or red
- SWS1 (short-wave sensitive) - ultraviolet or violet - lost in monotremes (platypus, echidna)
- SWS2 (short-wave sensitive) - violet or blue - lost in therians (placental mammals and marsupials)
- RH2 (rhodopsin-like cone opsin) - green - lost separately in amphibians and mammals, retained in reptiles and birds

A single rod opsin, rhodopsin, was present in the first jawed vertebrate, inherited from a jawless vertebrate ancestor:

- RH1 (rhodopsin) - blue-green - used night vision and color correction in low-light environments

==== Balance ====
Tetrapods retained the balancing function of the inner ear from fish ancestry.

==== Hearing ====
Air vibrations could not set up pulsations through the skull as in a proper auditory organ. The spiracle was retained as the otic notch, eventually closed in by the tympanum, a thin, tight membrane of connective tissue also called the eardrum (however this and the otic notch were lost in the ancestral amniotes, and later eardrums were obtained independently).

The hyomandibula of fish migrated upwards from its jaw supporting position, and was reduced in size to form the columella. Situated between the tympanum and braincase in an air-filled cavity, the columella was now capable of transmitting vibrations from the exterior of the head to the interior. Thus the columella became an important element in an impedance matching system, coupling airborne sound waves to the receptor system of the inner ear. This system had evolved independently within several different amphibian lineages.

The impedance matching ear had to meet certain conditions to work. The columella had to be perpendicular to the tympanum, small and light enough to reduce its inertia, and suspended in an air-filled cavity. In modern species that are sensitive to over 1 kHz frequencies, the footplate of the columella is 1/20th the area of the tympanum. However, in early amphibians the columella was too large, making the footplate area oversized, preventing the hearing of high frequencies. So it appears they could only hear high intensity, low frequency sounds—and the columella more probably just supported the brain case against the cheek.

Only in the early Triassic, about a hundred million years after they conquered land, did the tympanic middle ear evolve (independently) in all the tetrapod lineages. About fifty million years later (late Triassic), in mammals, the columella was reduced even further to become the stapes.

== See also ==
- Body plan
- Geologic time scale
- Hexapoda
- Marine tetrapods
- Octopus
- History of life
- Quadrupedalism § Quadrupeds vs. tetrapods
