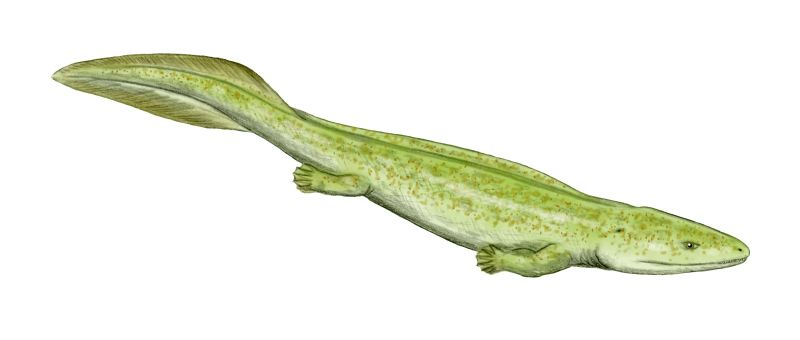
- Life restoration of Elginerpeton pancheni

Scientific classification
- Domain: Eukaryota
- Kingdom: Animalia
- Phylum: Chordata
- Clade: Sarcopterygii
- Clade: Tetrapodomorpha
- Clade: Stegocephali
- Family: †Elginerpetontidae; Ahlberg, 1995

Subgroups
- Elginerpeton; Obruchevichthys; Webererpeton

= Elginerpetontidae =

Elginerpetontidae Temporal range: Frasnian

Extinct family of tetrapodomorphs

Elginerpetontidae is an extinct family of basal stegocephalian tetrapodomorphs which lived in Europe during the Frasnian stage of the Late Devonian epoch. It contains the genera Elginerpeton, Obruchevichthys and Webererpeton.
