= Barwickia =

Barwickia Temporal range: Devonian

Scientific classification
- Kingdom: Animalia
- Phylum: Chordata
- Class: Dipnoi
- Family: †Fleurantiidae
- Genus: †Barwickia; Long, 1992

Type species
- †Barwickia downunda Long, 1992

Extinct genus of fishes

Barwickia is a genus of prehistoric lungfish which lived during the Devonian period. Fossils have been found at Mount Howitt in Victoria, Australia.
