= Obruchevichthys =

Obruchevichthys Temporal range: Frasnian

Scientific classification
- Kingdom: Animalia
- Phylum: Chordata
- Clade: Sarcopterygii
- Clade: Tetrapodomorpha
- Family: †Elginerpetontidae
- Genus: †Obruchevichthys; Vorobyeva, 1977

Type species
- Obruchevichthys gracilis Vorobyeva, 1977

Extinct genus of tetrapodomorphs

Obruchevichthys is an extinct genus of stem-tetrapod from Latvia during the Late Devonian. When the jawbone, the only known fossil of this creature, was uncovered in Latvia, it was mistaken as a lobe-fin fish. However, when it was analyzed, it proved to hold many similarities to Elginerpeton, from Scotland. It was then declared belonging to the earliest group of tetrapods.
