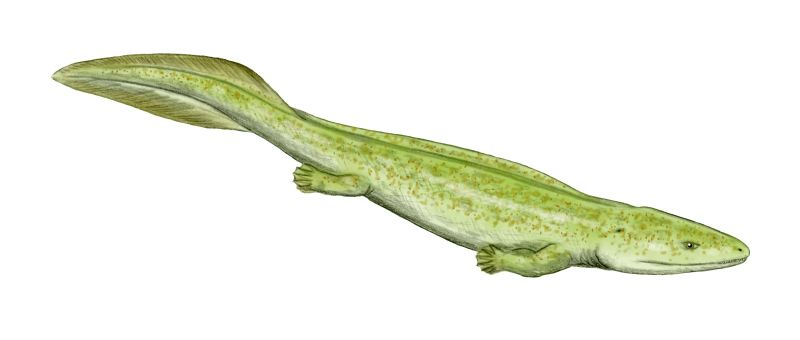
- Life restoration of Elginerpeton

Scientific classification
- Kingdom: Animalia
- Phylum: Chordata
- Family: †Elginerpetontidae
- Genus: †Elginerpeton; Ahlberg, 1995

Type species
- Elginerpeton pancheni Ahlberg, 1995

= Elginerpeton =

Elginerpeton Temporal range: Late Devonian, 375 Ma

Extinct genus of tetrapodomorphs

Elginerpeton is a genus of stegocephalian (stem-tetrapod), the fossils of which were recovered from Scat Craig, Morayshire in the UK, from rocks dating to the late Devonian Period (Late Frasnian stage, 375 million years ago). The type species is Elginerpeton pancheni.

Elginerpeton is known from skeletal fragments including a partial shoulder and hip, a femur, tibia (lower hind limb), and jaw fragments. The holotype is a lower jaw fragment estimated at 40 centimeters in total length. The total body is estimated to have measured about 1.5 m (5 ft) in length. Upon its description, Elginerpeton was allied with Obruchevichthys in the family Elginerpetontidae.

A biomechanical analysis of stegocephalian jaws has indicated that Elginerpeton had an unusual feeding habit among tetrapod relatives. Its jaws were thin, and plotted as the most susceptible to high stresses among the sample group. However, the heavy sculpturing of the bone may have reduced these stresses. It also had a high bite force, third overall compared to Crassigyrinus (second) and Megalocephalus (first). These two features combined indicated that the jaw was best suited for quick, strong bites for hunting small yet fast prey.
