= Marsdenichthys =

Marsdenichthys Temporal range: Late Devonian

Scientific classification
- Kingdom: Animalia
- Phylum: Chordata
- Clade: Tetrapodomorpha
- Genus: †Marsdenichthys; Long, 1985

Type species
- †M. longioccipitus Long, 1985

Extinct genus of tetrapodomorphs

Marsdenichthys is an extinct genus of Devonian tetrapodomorph. Fossils have been found from Mount Howitt in Victoria, Australia from strata that are Givetian-Frasnian in age. Mount Howitt is an important site that has been the source of many tetrapodomorph fossils, including Beelarongia and Howittichthys, both of which were first described from the locality.

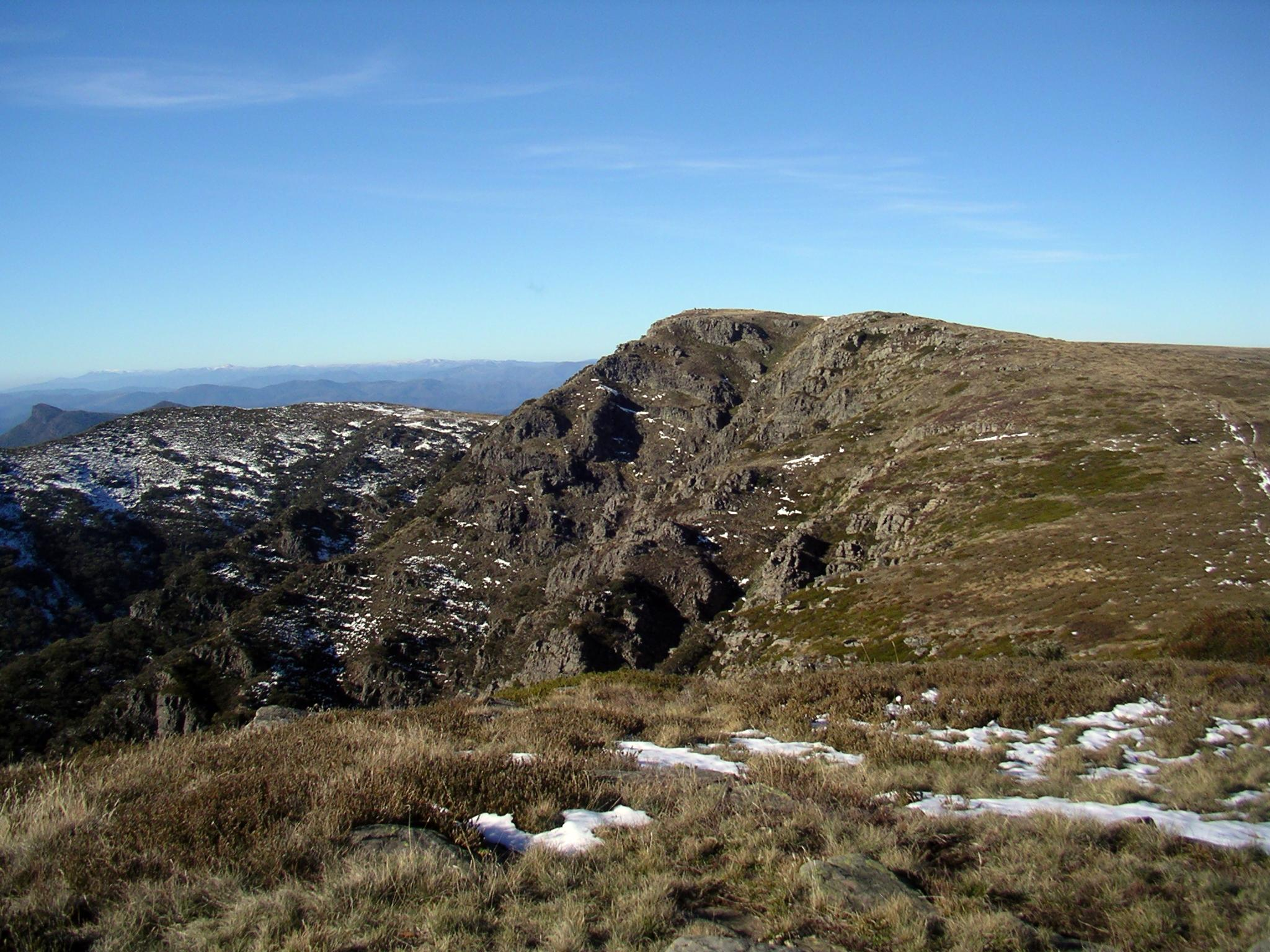
Specimens of Marsdenichthys have been found from Mount Howitt.

The genus Marsdenichthys was first named in 1985 on the basis of material collected from Mount Howitt. The genus was initially described as a member of the family Eusthenopteridae (now known as the Tristichopteridae), the first known from the southern hemisphere. However, the classification of Marsdenichthys within Tetrapodomorpha has often been debated and there is not yet a consensus on the exact phylogenetic relationships of the genus.

== Classification ==
When it was originally described as a tristichopterid by Long (1985), Marsdenichthys was considered to be the basalmost member of the family, based on such characters as the presence of extratemporal bones, the size ratio between the parietals and postparietals, and the presence of rounded scales with an internal median boss. At the time, this feature was thought to be unique to tristichopterids, but Long suggested that Marsdenichthys could be considered a specialized "osteolepidid" if the scale morphology was later found to be present in members of the family. Osteolepididae is now known to be paraphyletic along with the superorder Osteolepiformes, but several "non-tristichopterid osteolepiformes" have since been found with the scale morphology previously seen only in Marsdenichthys. These include the genera Medoevia, Canowindra, and Rhizodopsis.

Based on scale ornamentation, Marsdenichthys was assigned to the family Rhizodopsidae by Long (1999). However, the only phylogenetic analyses that included Marsdenichthys either placed it with Eusthenopteron in a clade within a monophyletic Osteolepiformes, a polytomy with Eusthenopteron basal to Megalichthys, or a polytomy basal to Medoevia and Gogonasus. It is possible that the classification of Marsdenichthys remains unresolved because there is a lack of derived characters in the incomplete Mount Howitt specimens. However, Holland et al. (2010) recently described new specimens from Mount Howitt that preserve previously unknown derived characters, mainly in the cheek and palate. However, because Holland et al. (2010) did not provide a phylogenetic analysis using the new specimens, the classification of Marsdenichthys remains unresolved.
