= Gavinia =

- Skull diagram of G. syntrips

Scientific classification
- Kingdom: Animalia
- Phylum: Chordata
- Clade: Sarcopterygii
- Genus: †Gavinia; Long, 1999

Extinct genus of fishes

Gavinia is an extinct genus of prehistoric sarcopterygian or lobe-finned fish. It is known from the Mount Howitt fossil site.

== See also ==
- Sarcopterygii
- List of sarcopterygians
- List of prehistoric bony fish
