= Zachełmie, Świętokrzyskie Voivodeship =

Zachełmie
- Village
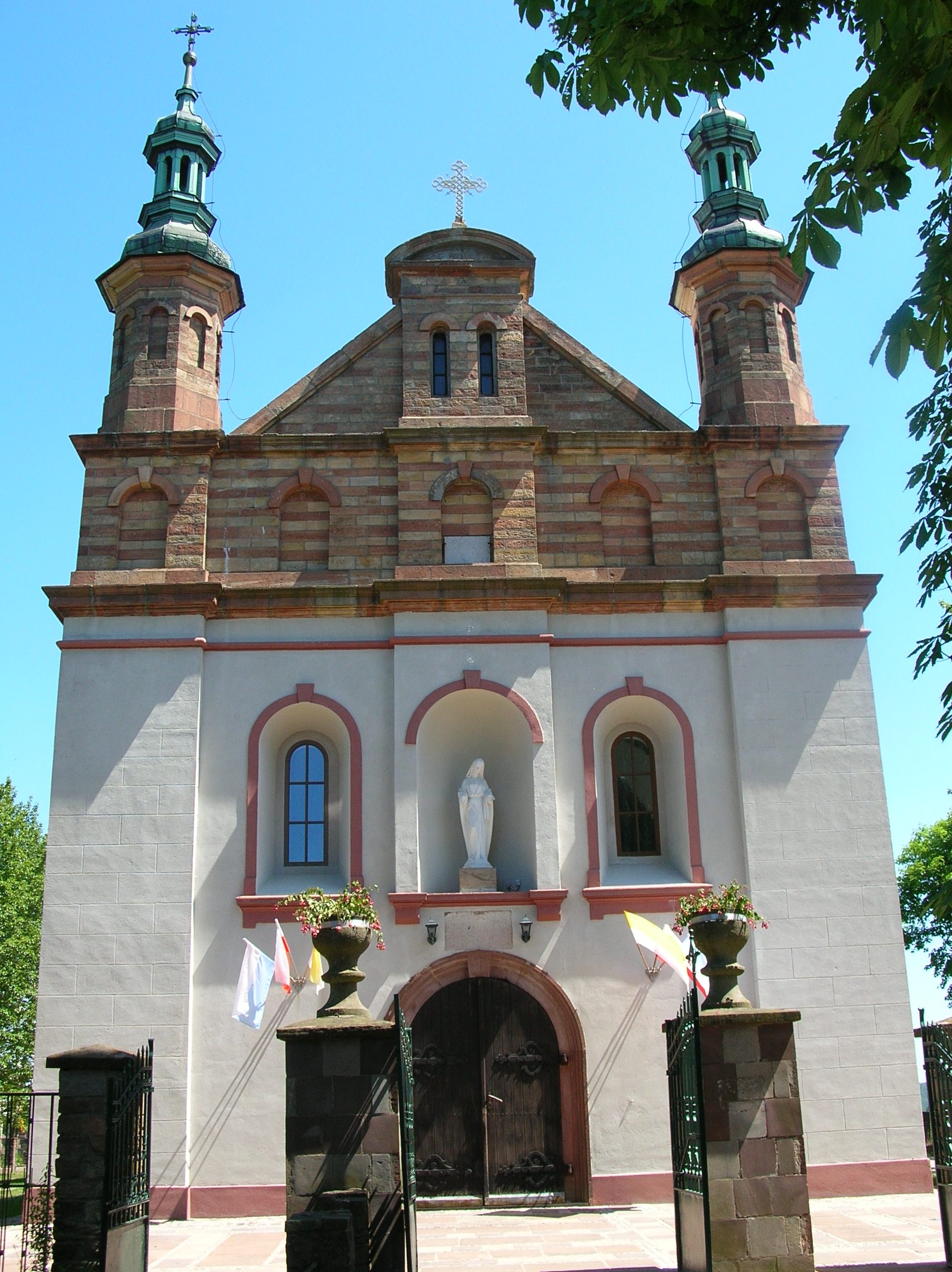
- Church in Zachełmie

- Location within Poland
- Coordinates: 50°58′29″N 20°41′44″E
- Country: Poland
- Voivodeship: Świętokrzyskie
- County: Kielce
- Gmina: Zagnańsk
- Population: 568

Zachełmie [za'xɛwmʲɛ] is a village in the administrative district of Gmina Zagnańsk, within Kielce County, Świętokrzyskie Voivodeship, in south-central Poland. It lies approximately 3 km (2 mi) east of Zagnańsk and 12 km (7 mi) north-east of the regional capital Kielce.

== Zachełmie Quarry ==
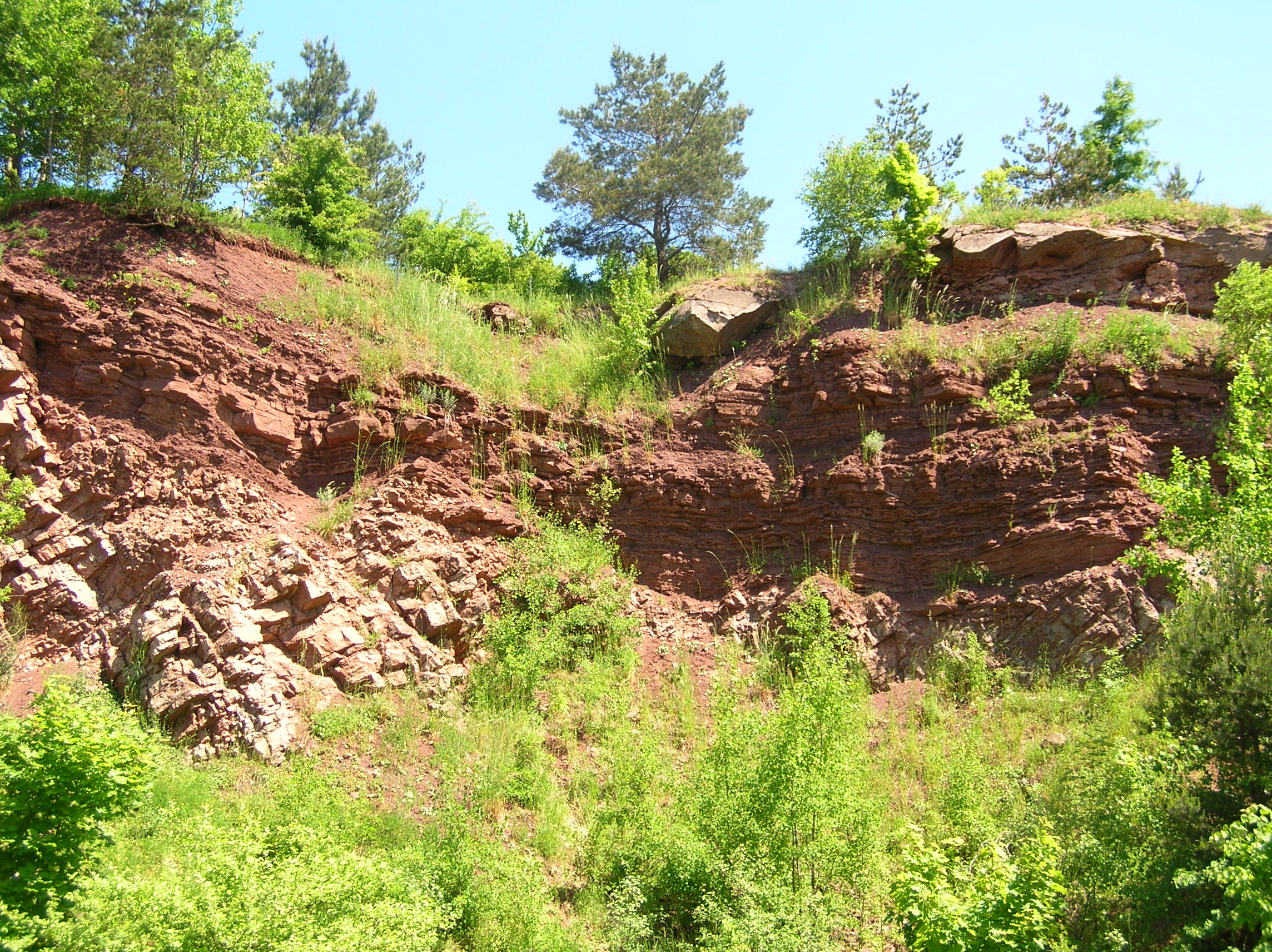
The Zachełmie quarry. Middle Devonian (Eifelian) limestones and dolomites covered by Lower Triassic red sandstones.

A former limestone quarry is located near the village. The rocks are part of the Świętokrzyskie (Holy Cross) Mountains, once on the southern coast of Laurasia, and have yielded 395-million-year-old fossil footprints of tetrapods. These are believed to be the oldest tracks of four-legged animals known to palaeontologists, pushing back their estimated evolution by more than 18 million years. The finding also suggests that the first vertebrates to walk on land may have evolved in marine tidal flats or lagoons, likely dining on animals washed up with the tides, rather than in freshwater habitats.
