= Beelarongia =

Beelarongia Temporal range: Middle Devonian (Givetian)

Scientific classification
- Kingdom: Animalia
- Phylum: Chordata
- Clade: Tetrapodomorpha
- Family: †Canowindridae
- Genus: †Beelarongia; Long, 1987
- Species: †B. patrichae

Binomial name
- †Beelarongia patrichae Long, 1987

Extinct genus of fishes

Beelarongia is a genus of prehistoric lobe-finned fish which lived during the Middle Devonian period (Givetian), about 387 to 382 million years ago). Fossils have been found at the Mount Howitt site, eastern Victoria, Australia.
