= Mount Howitt =

Mountain in Victoria, Australia

Mount Howitt (Toot-buck-nulluck)
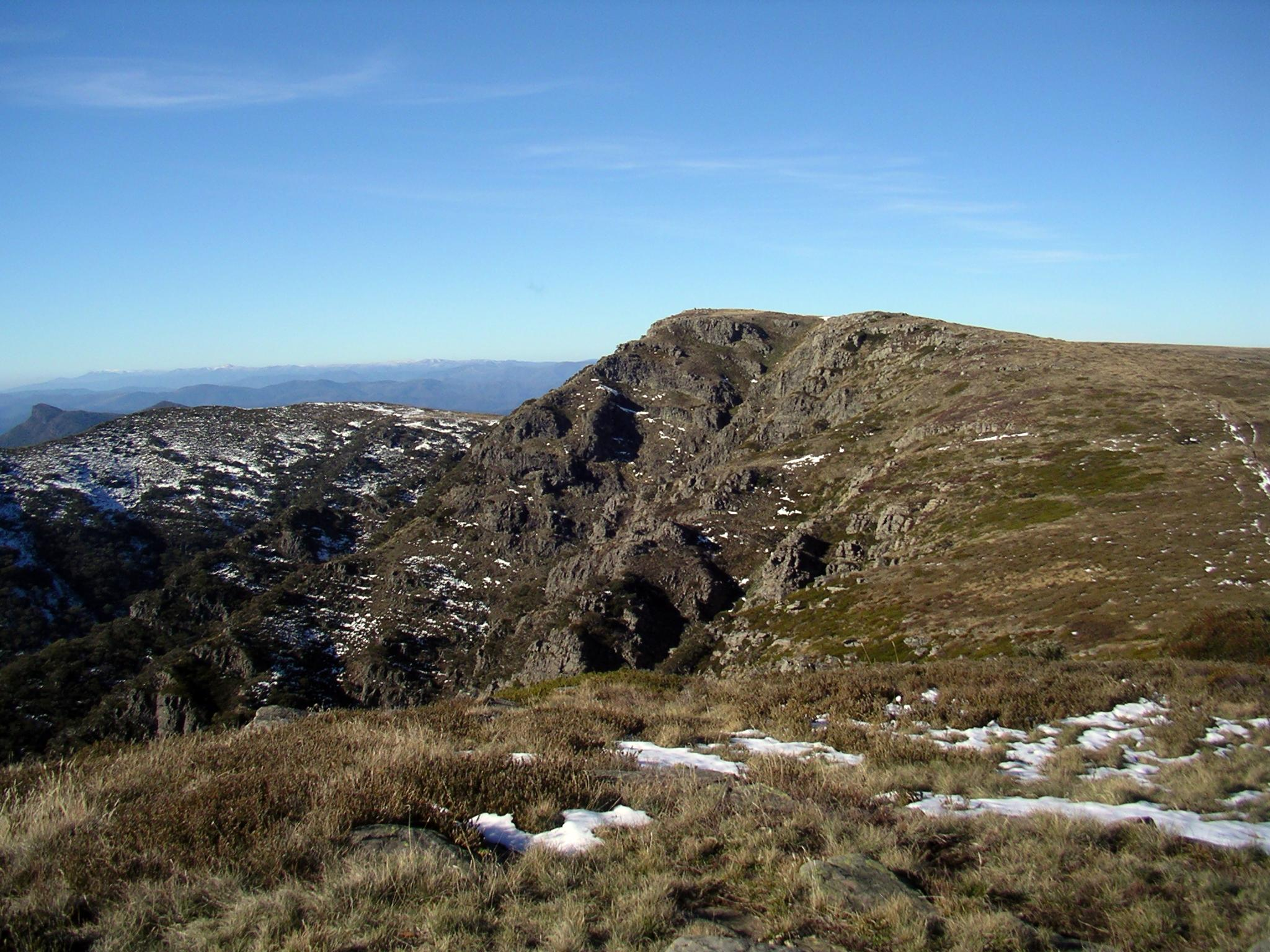
- The summit of Mount Howitt as seen from West Peak in late autumn, 2006

Highest point
- Elevation: 1,742 m (5,715 ft)AHD
- Coordinates: 37°11′S 146°39′E

Geography
- Location: Victoria, Australia
- Parent range: Great Dividing Range

Climbing
- Easiest route: Hike/ski

Mount Howitt, also known as Toot-buck-nulluck in the Gunai language, is a mountain in Victoria, Australia, named after the explorer and naturalist Alfred William Howitt. It is located in the Wonangatta Moroka Unit of the Alpine National Park, approximately 170 km north-east of Melbourne.

The mountain is a popular bushwalking destination due to its views and the relatively easy access in summer afforded by several trails, including the Australian Alps Walking Track. The closest point to a road is via MacAlister Springs and the Howitt Plains, a distance of about seven kilometres. There is also a longer and more difficult hike up the West Spur. It climbs from the Howqua River, which is generally accessed via Mount Stirling. In winter, road closures restrict access to trailheads to no closer than 15 kilometres away, making the area popular with back country and cross country skiers seeking a remote location.

== Vegetation ==
The mountain is surrounded by deep valleys, where riparian forests of manna gums dominate. At higher altitudes, mountain gum and snow gum forests begin to dominate, growing on sheltered sites at between 1,000 and 1,400 metres with a grassy or heathy understorey. The summit itself is above treeline.

== History ==
Aboriginal people used the King and Howqua areas as major trade routes across the Great Dividing Range, including Mount Howitt itself. They also had several quarries in the area that yielded the hard greenstone, which was highly valued for tools and weapons.

European settlement began in the 1840s, when grazing commenced, followed by the discovery of gold in the Howqua Valley in the 1860s.

== Shelters and alpine huts ==
The closest shelter to Mount Howitt is the Vallejo Gantner Hut at Macalister Springs. There is also a reliable water source provided by a spring-water pipe which flows throughout the year, even during drought. In the summer of 2013-2014, a new toilet was built at Macalister Springs with southern-facing views. It is a long-drop toilet, with waste being helicoptered out when the effluent tank is full.

== Paleontology ==
Fossil species from the Late Devonian are known, such as the lobe-finned fish Beelarongia.

== In popular culture ==
The area around Mount Howitt is a setting for the Tomorrow series of books by John Marsden. In the books, he changes the name of the nearby Cross Cut Saw to Tailor's Stitch, and the Devils Staircase to Satan's Steps.

The 1982 film The Man from Snowy River was filmed in the area around Mount Howitt. Perhaps most prominent of the locations that appears in the film is at Hells Window, on Mount Magdala, which is connected to Mount Howitt via Big Hill.

== See also ==
- Australian Alps
- List of mountains in Australia § Victoria
- Wonnangatta murders
