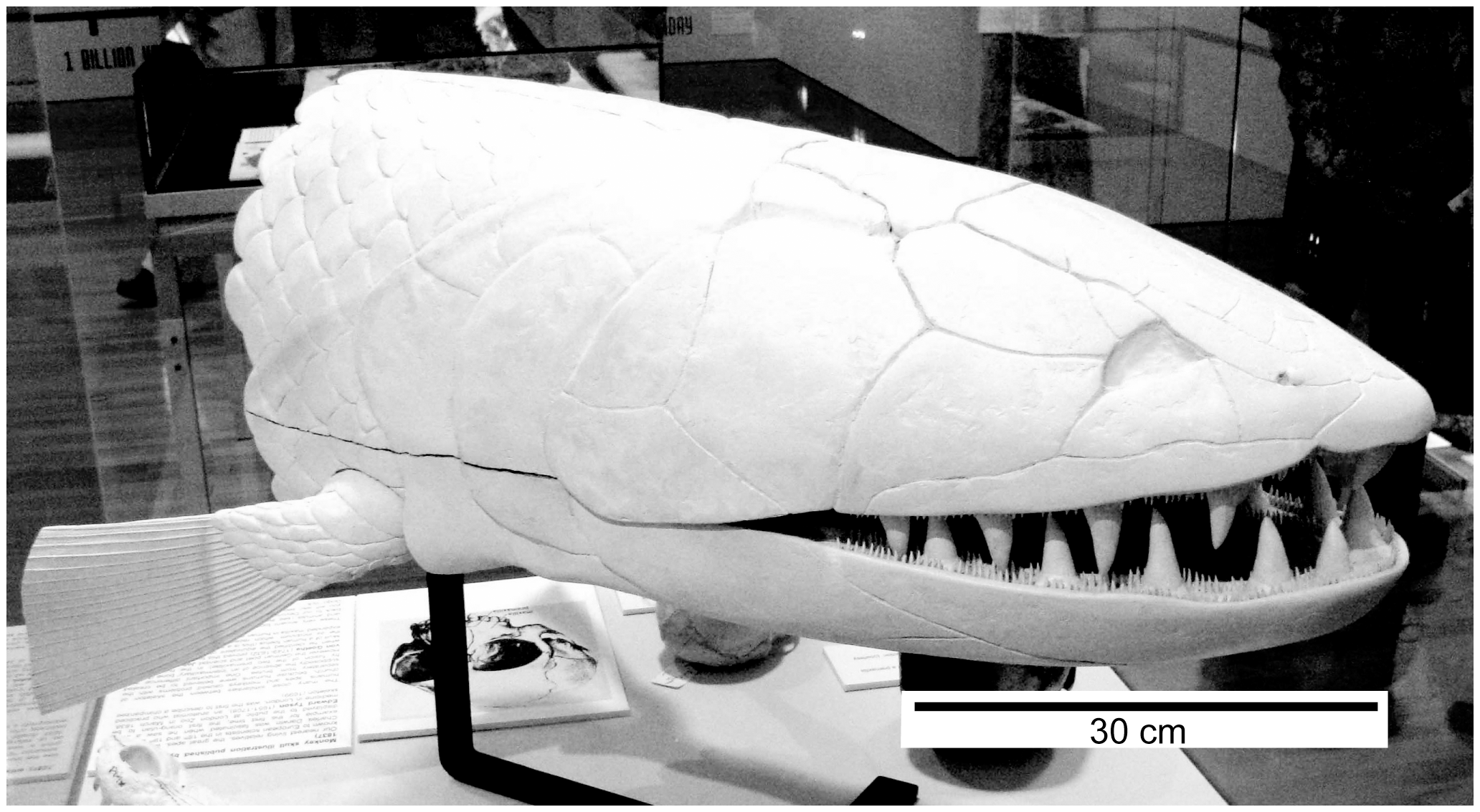
- Reconstruction of Edenopteron keithcrooki

Scientific classification
- Kingdom: Animalia
- Phylum: Chordata
- Clade: Eotetrapodiformes
- Family: †Tristichopteridae
- Genus: †Edenopteron; Young et al., 2013
- Species: †E. keithcrooki

Binomial name
- †Edenopteron keithcrooki Young et al., 2013

= Edenopteron =

Edenopteron Temporal range: Late Devonian -Famennian

Extinct genus of tetrapodomorphs

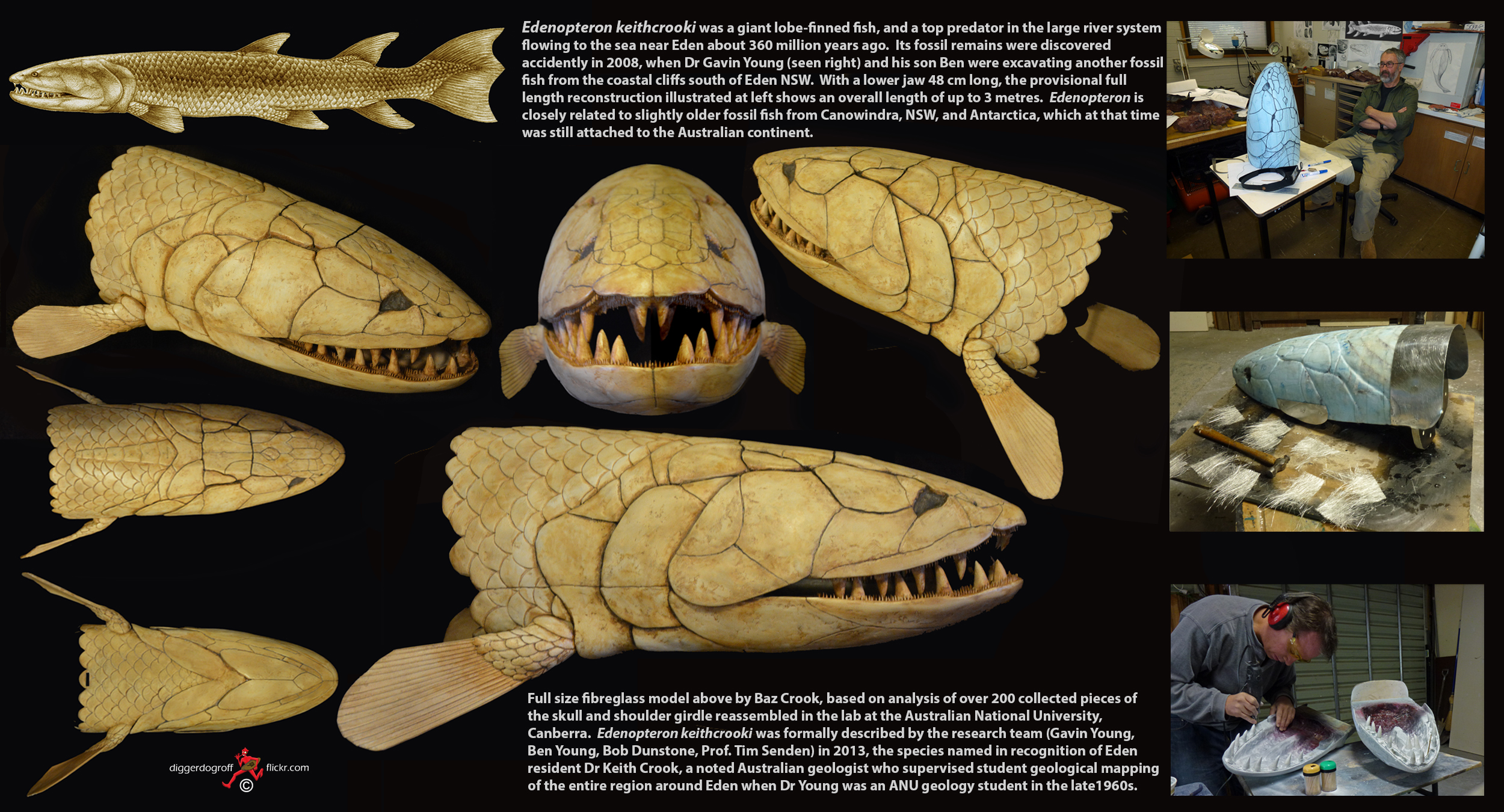

Edenopteron is a genus of large tristichopterid fish from the Late Devonian (Famennian) of what is now southeastern Australia. It is known from a single specimen of a single species, E. keithcrooki, described in 2013.

== Discovery ==
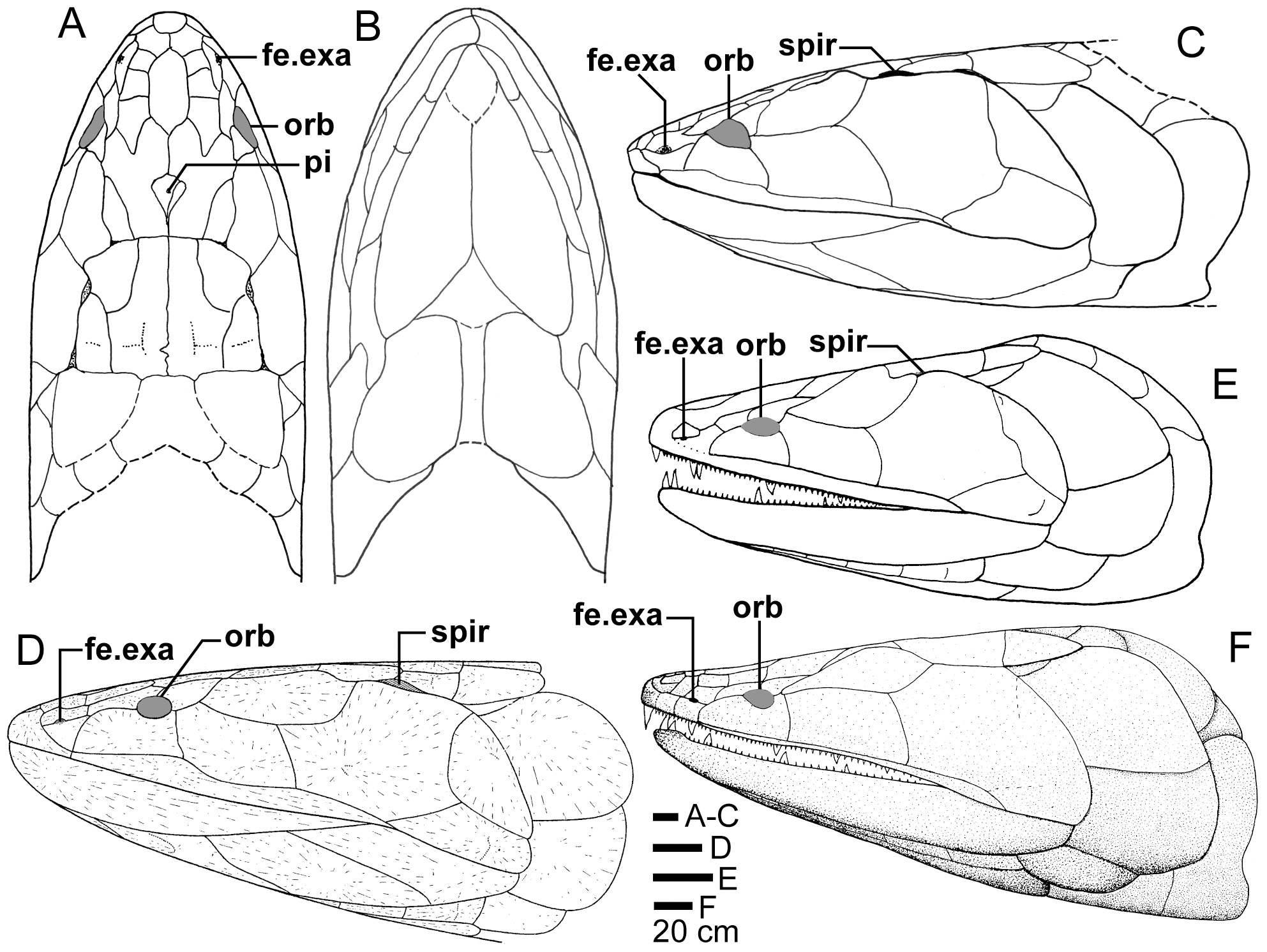
Skull and shoulder-girdle restorations of Edenopteron and other tristichopterids. A, B, C, Edenopteron; D, Eusthenodon E. Cabonnichthys; F, Mandageria

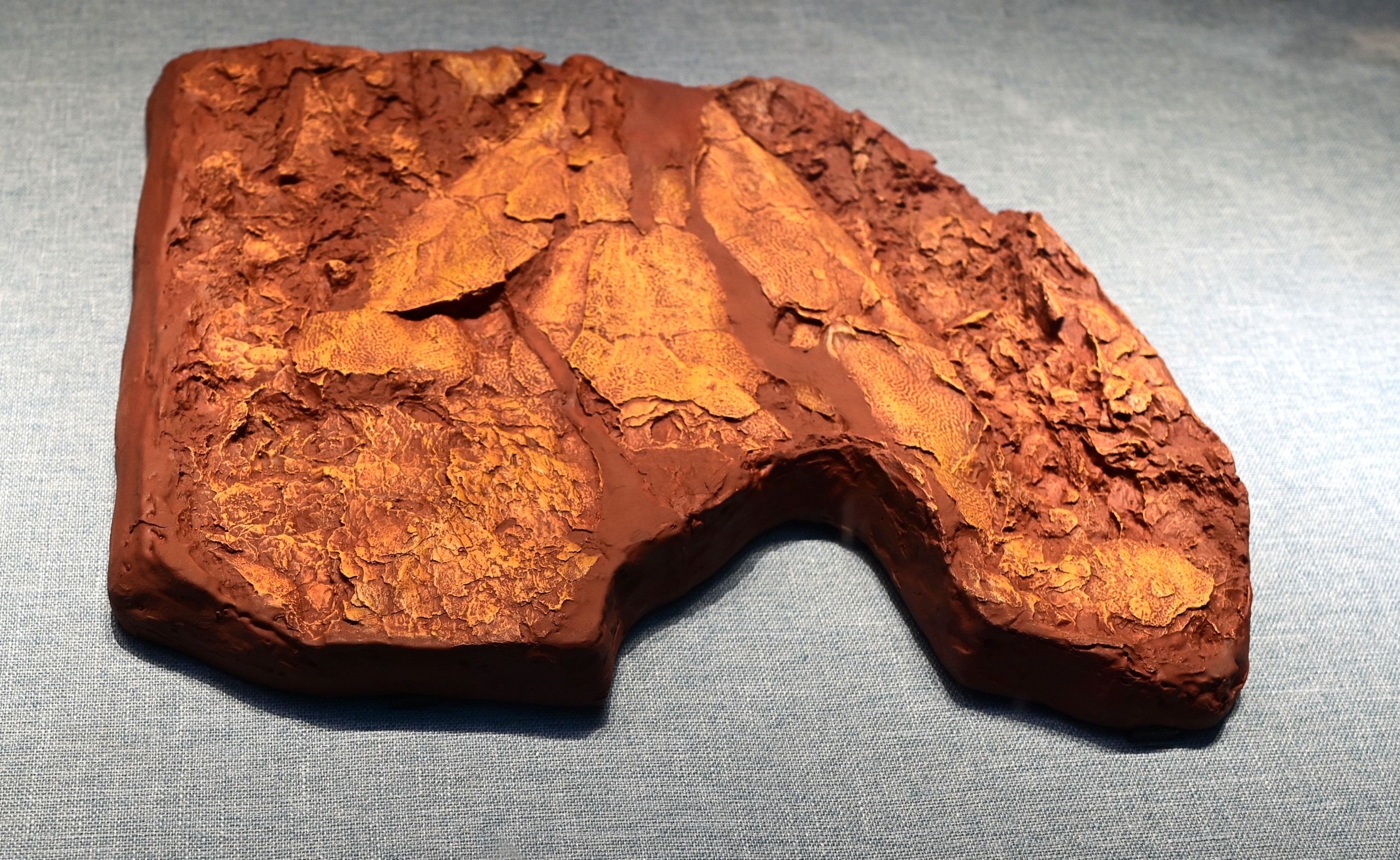
Fossil replica, Baoding Natural History Museum

Edenopteron keithcrooki is known from remains excavated from the Worange Point Formation, near the town of Eden on the coast of New South Wales in 2008. The generic name is a combination of the name Eden and pteron, meaning wing or fin in Greek. The specific name honors Dr. Keith Crook of the Australian National University for his discovery of several fossil sites in New South Wales and his key role in helping to map the geology around Eden.

== Description ==
The holotype consists of numerous semi-articulated remains, including an incomplete skull roof, snout, palate, cheeks, lower jaws and associated dermal bones, a left shoulder girdle, and assorted scales. Reconstructions suggest a skull length of 30 cm (12 in) and lower jaw length of about 48 cm (19 in). The endoskeleton shows a large or complete lack of ossification. The orbits (eye-sockets) are somewhat triangular rather than oval-shaped. Edenopteron possessed dentary fangs and premaxillary tusks, which are presumed to be derived traits for other large tristichopterids. By comparison to body size ratios of other tristichopterid fishes (e.g. Eusthenodon, Langlieria, Mandageria), the body length of Edenopteron is estimated at 2.9—3.2 m (9.5—10.5 ft), while study in 2023 estimates length up to 3 metres (9.8 ft). Additional fossil material may be described in the future: according to lead researcher Gavin Young, quoted in the Canberra Times: "We know that part of the pectoral girdle is still in the rock, so if we can lift up a few more blocks, we might find that the body is actually preserved in the rock."

== Classification ==
Edenopteron is assigned to the Gondwanan tristichopterid subfamily Mandageriinae due to similarities shared with Cabonnichthys and Mandageria, including paired vomers in the palate, submandibular bones overlapping ventral jaw margin, and scales ornamented with widely-spaced grooves.
