= Evieux Formation =

Geologic formation in Belgium

- Stratigraphic range: Famennian
- Type: Geological formation
- Underlies: Dolhain Formation/Comblain-au-Pont Formation
- Overlies: Monfort Formation/Citadelle de Huy Formation

Location
- Region: Namur Province
- Country: Belgium

The Evieux Formation, formerly included within the "Bois-de-Mouches Formation" and containing the Strud locality, is a late Devonian formation from Belgium. It preserves a wide range of fossils, including some of the earliest branchiopod crustaceans, various fish, and the putative insect Strudiella.

== Paleobiota ==
Color key
Taxon	Reclassified taxon	Taxon falsely reported as present	Dubious taxon or junior synonym	Ichnotaxon	Ootaxon	Morphotaxon

Notes
Uncertain or tentative taxa are in small text; ~~crossed out~~ taxa are discredited.

Paleobiota
Genus	Species	Higher taxon	Notes	Images
Strudiella	S. devonica	Mandibulata	Debated whether it is an insect or a non-insect crustacean.	Interpretation of Strudiella
Strudops	S. goldenbergi	Notostraca	The earliest notostracan known	Strudops reconstruction
Haltinnaias	H. serrata	Anostraca	The earliest fairy shrimp known	
Gesvesia	G. pernegrei	Spinicaudata	One of the few diplostracan fossils with preserved internal anatomy	
Tealliocaris	T. walloniensis	Pygocephalomorpha	The earliest freshwater decapod known	T. etheridgii reconstruction
Schramidontus	S. labasensis	Angustidontida	One of only two angustidontids, alongside the type genus Angustidontus.	Reconstruction of Angustidontus
Nervicaris	N. belgica	Echinocarididae (Phyllocarida)		
Hardieopteridae indet.	Unapplicable	Kokomopteroidea	Several juvenile specimens, not assignable to any genus	
Ericixerxes	E. pottii	Euthycarcinoidea	Likely breathed air as evidenced by unusual circular structures in the fossil's abdomen	
Microconchus	M. helicteres	Microconchida	Lived in lagoonal ponds	Microconchus from the Devonian of Ohio
Grossilepis	G. rikiki	Bothriolepididae	Also known from a locality near Moresnet	
Turrisaspis	T. strudensis	Groenlandaspididae	Small size of specimens shows Strud was likely a placoderm "nursery"	T. elektor reconstruction
Groenlandaspis	G. potyi	Groenlandaspididae	One of the few known Paleozoic genera with preserved colour	G. antarctica illustration
Phyllolepis	P. undulata	Phyllolepididae	Synonymised with several other species	Reconstruction of Phyllolepis
Remigolepis	R. ?durnalensis	Antiarchi	Known from the Becco locality, as opposed to Strud	R. zhongweiensis reconstruction
Diplacanthidae indet.	Unapplicable	Acanthodii	Known from two large spines	
Holoptychius	H. flemingi	Porolepiformes		Life restoration of Holoptychius sp.
Soederberghia	S. sp	Dipnoi	A relatively widespread lungfish	
Jarvikia?	?J. sp	Dipnoi		
Langlieria	L. socqueti	Tristichopteridae	Also known from the Catskill Formation	Jawbone of Langlieria
Eusthenodon	E. wangsjoi	Tristichopteridae	Known from all over the world	Life restoration of E. wangsjoi
Stegocephalia indet.	Unapplicable	Elpistostegalia	Fragmentary remains, with Ichthyostega-like jawbones and a whatcheeriid-like postorbital bone	
Moresnetia	M. zalesskyi	Spermatophyta	One of the earliest seed plants	
Dorinnotheca	D. streelii	Lyginopteridales	One of the earliest known seed plants	
Condrusia	C. rumex	Spermatophyta	Gained a lectotype in 2006	C. rumex fossil
Thorezia	T. verezensis	Spermatophyta		
Archaeopteris	A. roemeriana	Progymnospermopsida	One of the most widespread Devonian trees	Fossil of A. hibernica
Barinophyton	B. citrulliforme	Barinophytes	Known from various other localities	B. citrulliforme fossil from Pennsylvania
Aneurophyton	A. olnense	Aneurophytales	Basal progymnosperm	Fossil of A. sp
Rhacophyton	R. condrusorum	Rhacophytales	One of the most abundant plants at Evieux	Rhacophyton sp fossil
Eviostachya	E. sp	Sphenophyllales		
Sphenophyllum	S. subtenerrimum	Sphenophyllales		
Barsostrobus	B. famennensis	Lycophyta		
