= Devonosteus =

Devonosteus Temporal range: Late Frasnian

Scientific classification
- Domain: Eukaryota
- Kingdom: Animalia
- Phylum: Chordata
- Clade: Sarcopterygii
- Clade: Tetrapodomorpha
- Family: †Tristichopteridae
- Genus: †Devonosteus; Jaekel, 1927
- Species: †D. proteus

Binomial name
- †Devonosteus proteus Jaekel, 1927

Extinct genus of fishes

Devonosteus is an extinct genus of prehistoric marine lobe-finned fish known from the Late Devonian. It contains a single species, D. proteus from the late Frasnian of Wildungen, Germany. It has sometimes been considered a lungfish of the family Holodontidae, but this remains uncertain as the original specimen may be lost. Alternatively, it may be a tristichopterid, a type of basal tetrapodomorph.

== See also ==
- Sarcopterygii
- List of sarcopterygians
- List of prehistoric bony fish
