= Heddleichthys =

Heddleichthys Temporal range: Devonian (Famennian)

Scientific classification
- Domain: Eukaryota
- Kingdom: Animalia
- Phylum: Chordata
- Clade: Sarcopterygii
- Clade: Tetrapodomorpha
- Clade: Eotetrapodiformes
- Family: †Tristichopteridae
- Genus: †Heddleichthys; Snitting, 2009
- Species: †H. dalgleisiensis

Binomial name
- †Heddleichthys dalgleisiensis (Anderson, 1859)

Synonyms
- Diplopterus Dalgleisiensis Anderson, 1859; Eusthenopteron? dalgleisiensis Jarvik, 1950

Extinct genus of tetrapodomorphs

Heddleichthys is a genus of prehistoric sarcopterygian (lobe-finned "fish"), from the end of the Devonian period (Famennian). It was discovered in Dura Den Formation, Scotland. Heddleichthys is a derived tristichopterid, the first from Britain.
