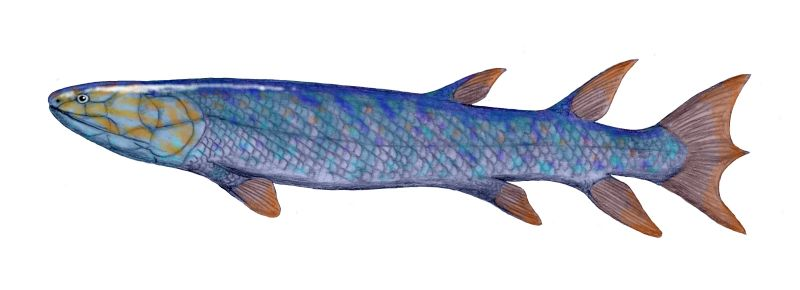
- Life restoration of E. foordi

Scientific classification
- Kingdom: Animalia
- Phylum: Chordata
- Clade: Eotetrapodiformes
- Family: †Tristichopteridae
- Genus: †Eusthenopteron; Whiteaves, 1881

Type species
- †Eusthenopteron foordi Whiteaves, 1881

Species
- See text

Synonyms
- †Jarvikina Vorobyeva, 1977

= Eusthenopteron =

Eusthenopteron Temporal range: Late Devonian, 383.7–372.2 Ma

Extinct genus of tetrapodomorphs

Eusthenopteron (from Greek: εὖσθένος eûsthénos 'stout', and Greek: πτερόν pteron 'wing' or 'fin') is an extinct genus of prehistoric marine lobe-finned fish known from several species that lived during the Late Devonian period, about 385 million years ago. It has attained an iconic status from its close relationship to tetrapods. Early depictions of animals of this genus show them emerging onto land, but paleontologists now think that Eusthenopteron species were strictly aquatic animals, though this is not completely known.

The genus was first described by J. F. Whiteaves in 1881, as part of a large collection of fishes from Miguasha, Quebec, Canada. Some 2,000 Eusthenopteron specimens have been collected from Miguasha, one of which was the object of intensely detailed study and several papers by paleoichthyologist Erik Jarvik between the 1940s and the 1990s. Further species have been described from other parts of Canada and northern Europe, indicating that this genus had a wide distribution.

== Taxonomy ==
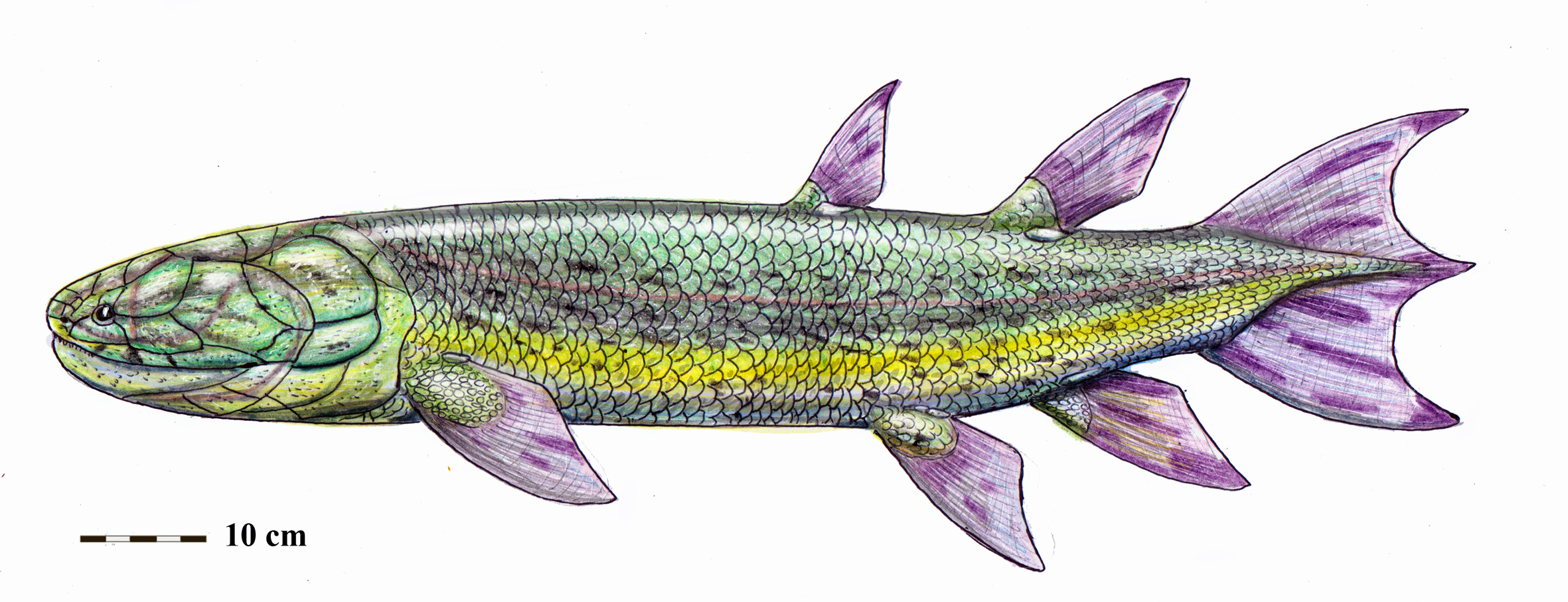
Life restoration of E. wenjukowi

Eusthenopteron is placed in the family Tristichopteridae, which has also been alternatively named Eusthenopteridae after this genus. It is related to genera such as Tristichopterus and Eusthenodon.

Eusthenopteron was widespread throughout what is now considered the Northern Hemisphere (which was located around the Equator at the time), and at least seven to eight species are known from Eurasia and North America. The following species list is based on Downs, Daeschler, Long & Shubin (2018):

- †E. farloviensis White, 1961 - Frasnian of England
- †E. foordi Whiteaves, 1881 (type species) - Frasnian of Quebec, Canada (Escuminac Formation in Miguasha National Park). Named after Arthur Humphreys Foord.
- †E. jenkinsi Downs, Daeschler, Long & Shubin, 2018 - Frasnian of Nunavut, Canada (Fram Formation). Named after Farish Jenkins.
- †E. kurshi Zupiņš, 2008 - late Givetian of Latvia (Lode Formation)
- †E. obruchevi Vorobyeva, 1977 - late Devonian of Latvia. Named after Vladimir Obruchev.
- †E. saevesoederberghi Jarvik, 1937 - Frasnian of Latvia (Pļaviņas Formation). Named after Gunnar Säve-Söderbergh
- †E. traquairi Westoll, 1937 - Frasnian of Elgin, Scotland. Named after Ramsay Traquair.
- †E. wenjukowi (Rohon, 1889) - Frasnian of Leningrad Oblast, Russia (=Cricodus wenjukowi Rohon, 1889, Jarvikina Vorobyeva, 1977)

The species E. wenjukowi was moved to its own genus, Jarvikina, in 1977 based on apparent morphological differences from Eusthenopteron, although this classification has been disputed. The species E. jenkinisi, described in 2018, indicates that Eusthenopteron may have been more morphologically variable than previously assumed, which further supports placing wenjukowi back in Eusthenopteron. The former species E. dalgleisiensis is now placed in its own genus, Heddleichthys.

== Description ==
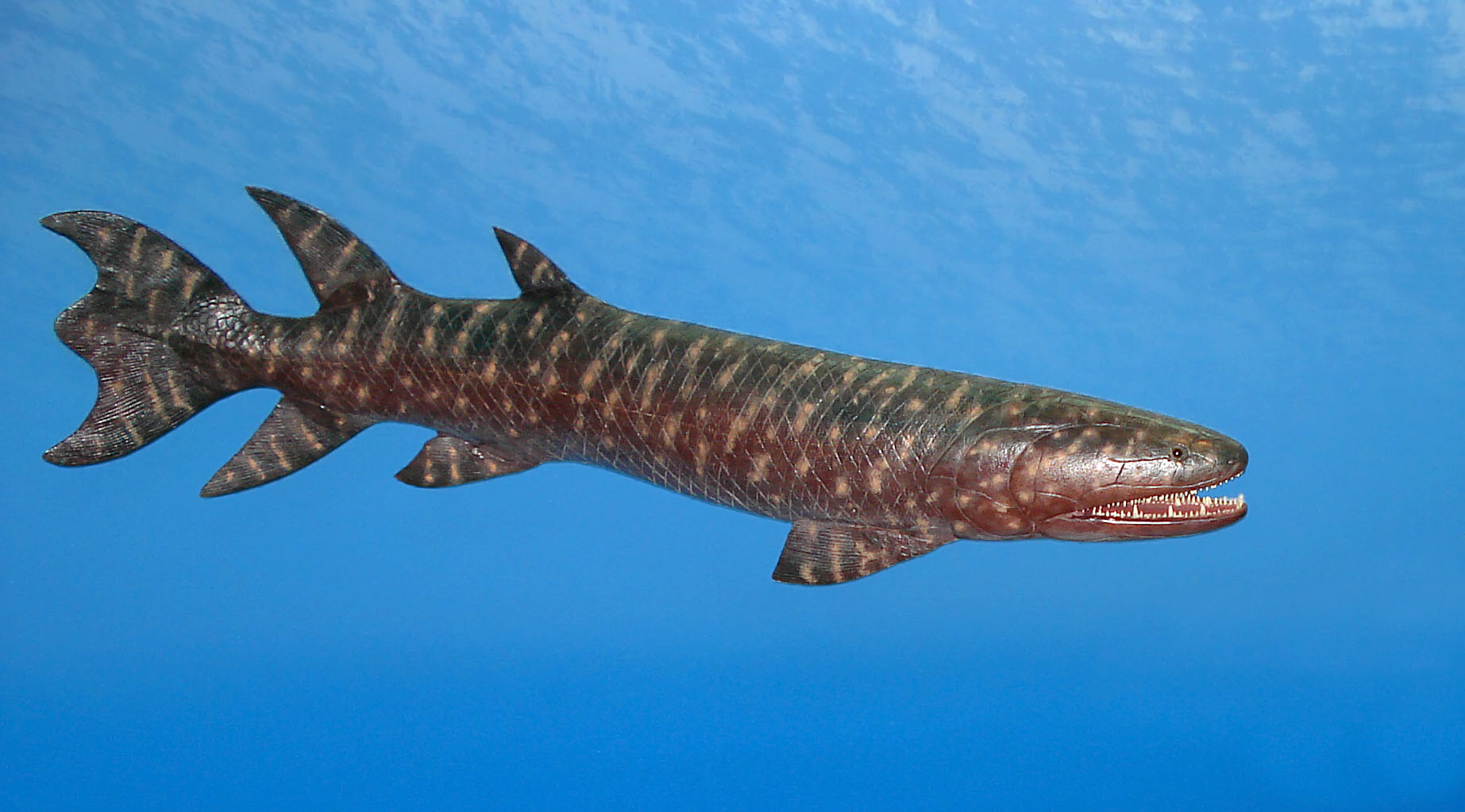
Reconstruction of Eusthenopteron

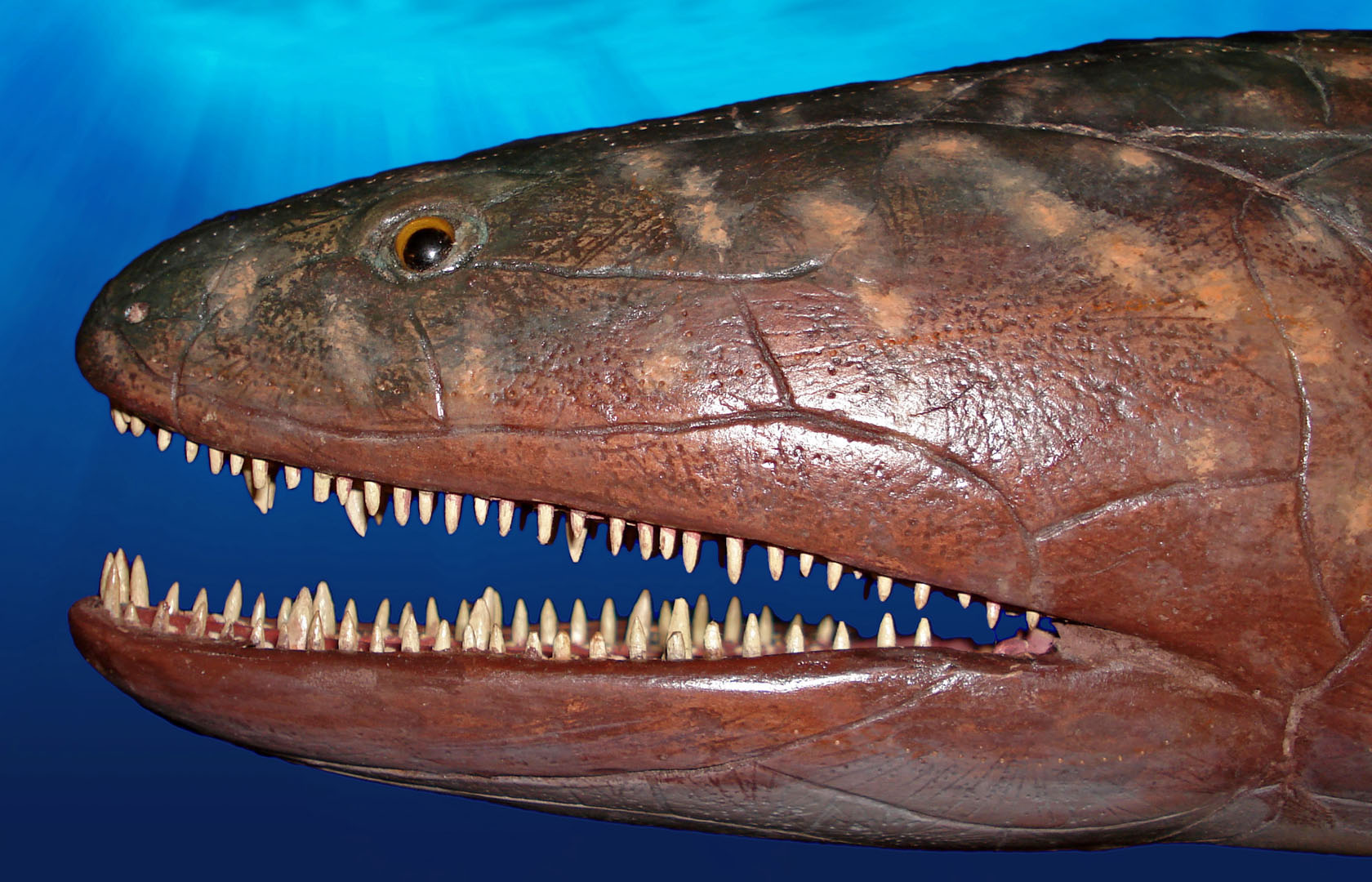
Head of reconstruction

Eusthenopteron is a medium- to large-sized tristichopterid. The species E. foordi is estimated to have exceeded 1.5 m (4 ft 11 in) in length, while the species E. jenkinsi probably reached 2.1 m (6 ft 11 in). Eusthenopteron may have weighed around 50 kilograms.

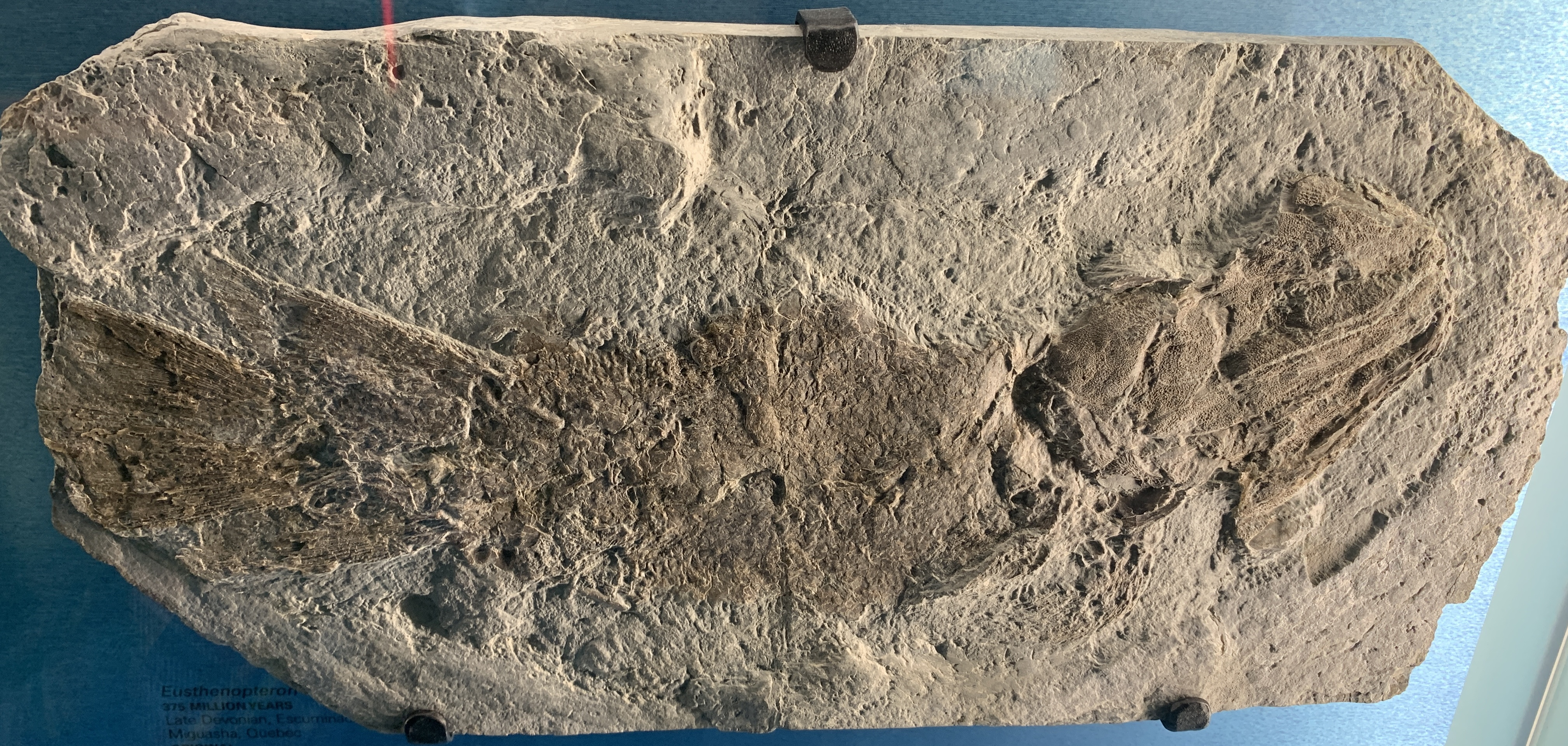
Eusthenopteron foordi, Escuminac Formation, Quebec (Canada). At the Royal Tyrrell Museum of Palaeontology.

The earliest known fossilized evidence of bone marrow has been found in Eusthenopteron, which may be the origin of bone marrow in tetrapods.

It may have eaten smaller fish.

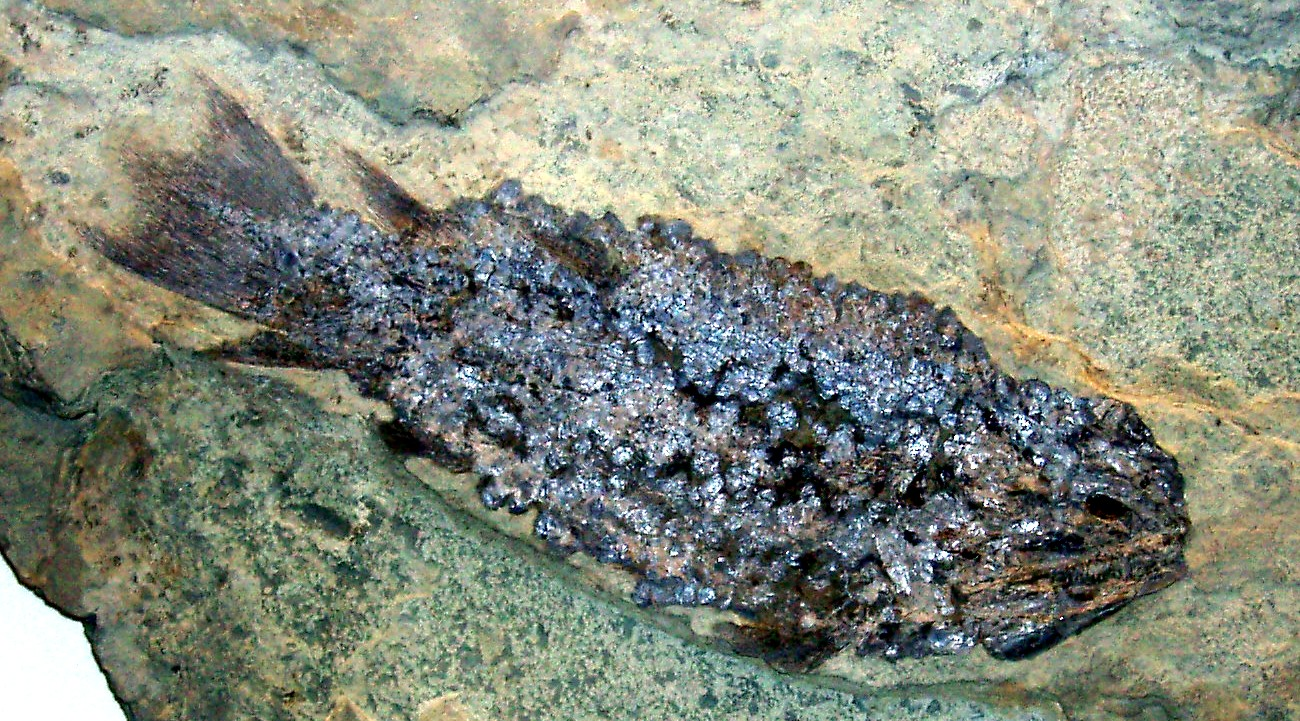
Eusthenopteron foordi

Eusthenopteron shares many unique features among fishes but in common with the earliest-known tetrapods. It shares a similar pattern of skull roofing bones with stem tetrapoda forms such as Ichthyostega and Acanthostega. Eusthenopteron, like other tetrapodomorph fishes, had internal nostrils (or a choana), one of the defining traits of tetrapodomorphs, including tetrapods. It also had labyrinthodont teeth, characterized by infolded enamel, which characterizes all of the earliest known tetrapods as well.

Unlike the early tetrapods, Eusthenopteron did not have larval gills.

=== Anatomy ===
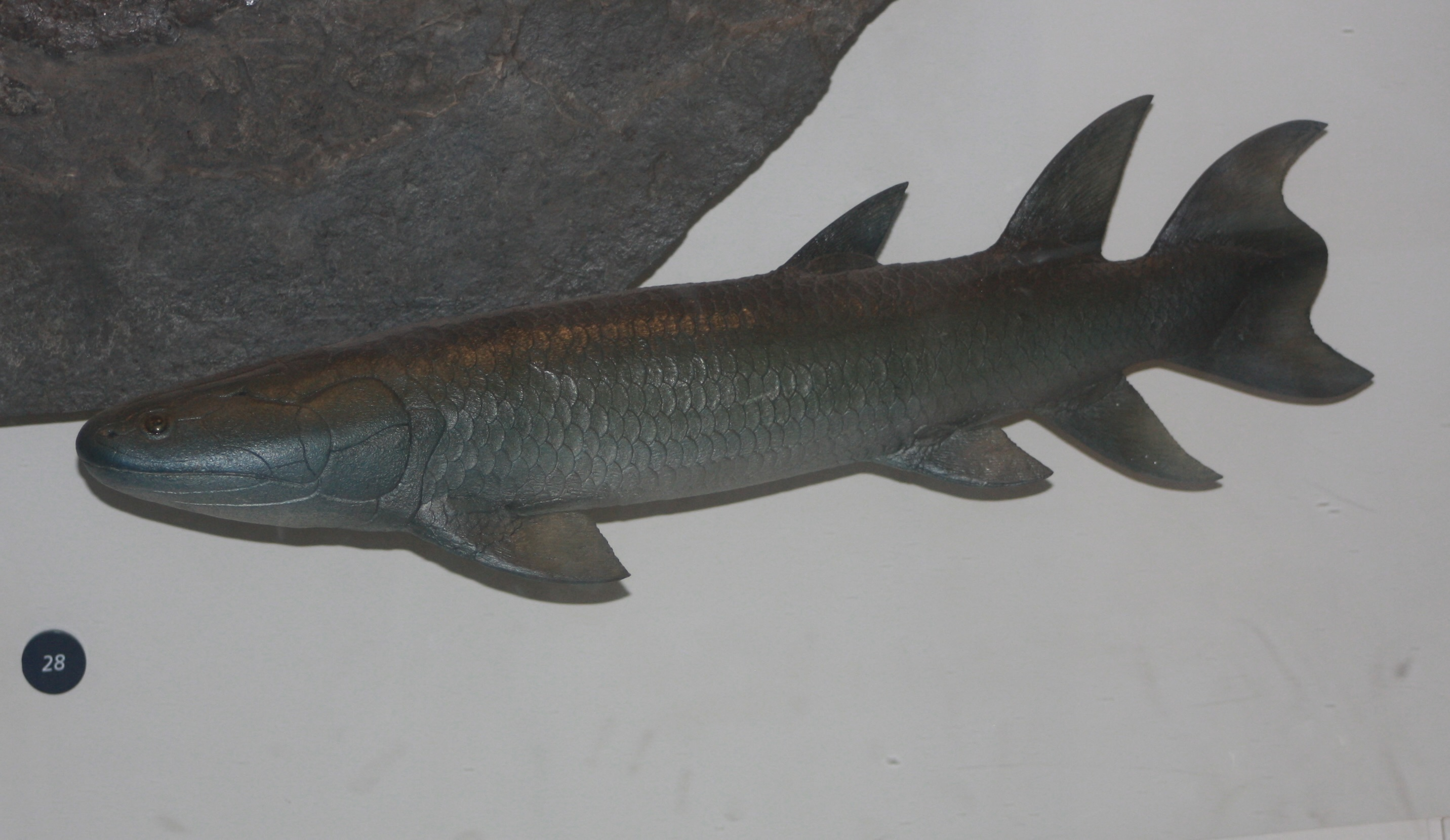
Model of Eusthenopteron at the American Museum of Natural History

Like other fish-like sarcopterygians, Eusthenopteron possessed a two-part cranium, which hinged at mid-length along an intracranial joint. Eusthenopteron's notoriety comes from the pattern of its fin endoskeleton, which bears a distinct humerus, ulna, and radius in the fore-fin and femur, tibia, and fibula in the pelvic fin. These appendicular long bones had epiphyseal growth plates that allowed substantial longitudinal growth through endochondral ossification, as in tetrapod long bones. These six appendicular bones also occur in tetrapods and are a synapomorphy of a large clade of sarcopterygians, possibly Tetrapodomorpha (the humerus and femur are present in all sarcopterygians). Similarly, its elasmoid scales lack superficial odontodes composed of dentine and enamel; this loss appears to be a synapomorphy with more crownward tetrapodomorphs. Eusthenopteron differs significantly from some later Carboniferous tetrapods in the apparent absence of a recognized larval stage and a definitive metamorphosis. In even the smallest known specimen of Eusthenopteron foordi, with a length of 29 millimetres (1.1 in), the lepidotrichia cover all of the fins, which does not happen until after metamorphosis in genera like Polydon (the American paddlefish). This might indicate that Eusthenopteron developed directly, with the hatchling already attaining the adult's general body form (Cote et al., 2002).

In Late Devonian vertebrate speciation, descendants of pelagic lobe-finned fish—like Eusthenopteron—exhibited a sequence of adaptations: * Panderichthys, suited to muddy shallows; * Tiktaalik with limb-like fins that could take it onto land; * Early tetrapods in weed-filled swamps, such as: * Acanthostega which had feet with eight digits, * Ichthyostega with limbs. Descendants also included pelagic lobe-finned fish such as coelacanth species.

== See also ==
- Gogonasus
- Tiktaalik – an even more tetrapod-like sarcopterygian
