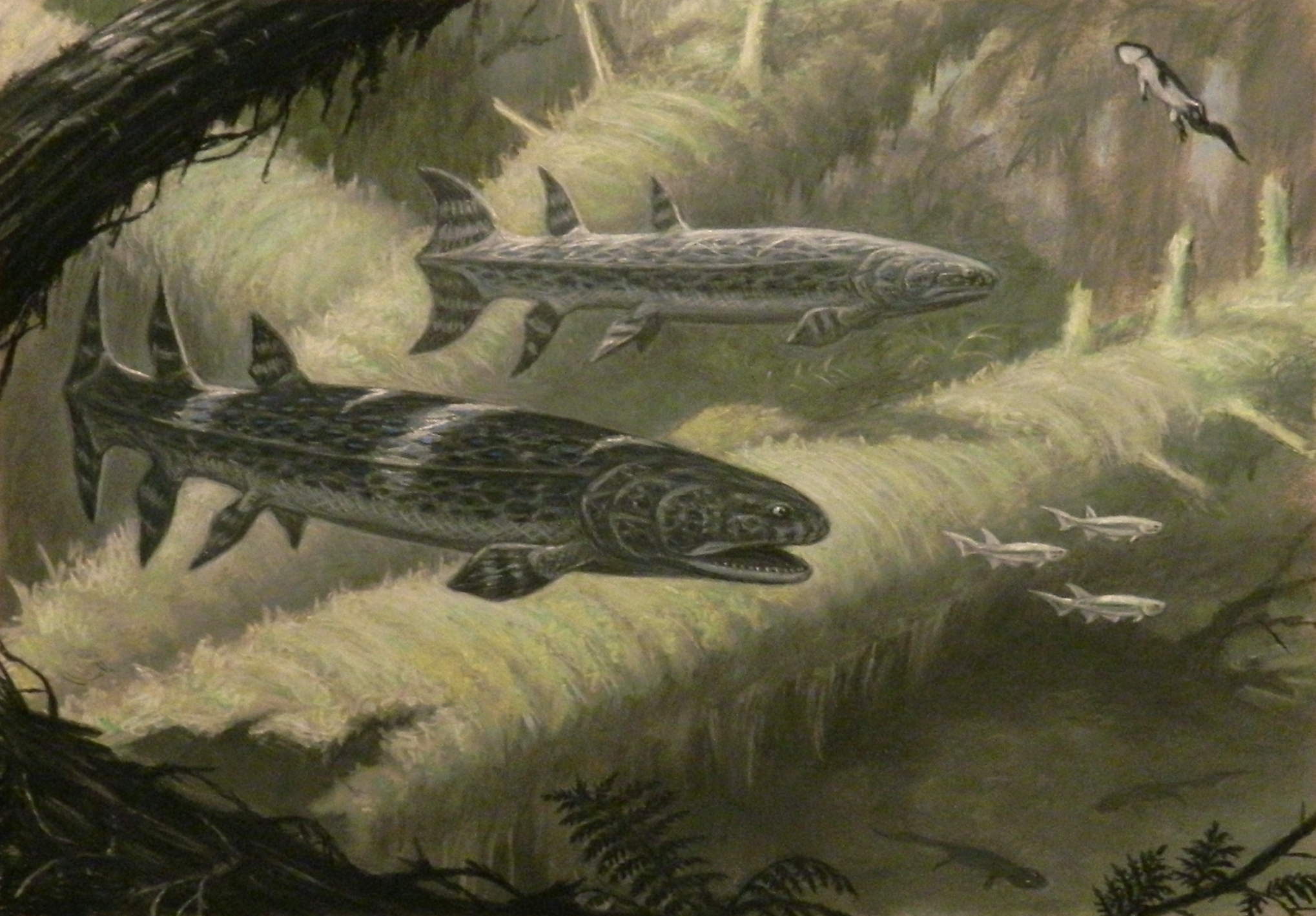
- Life restoration of H. lindae
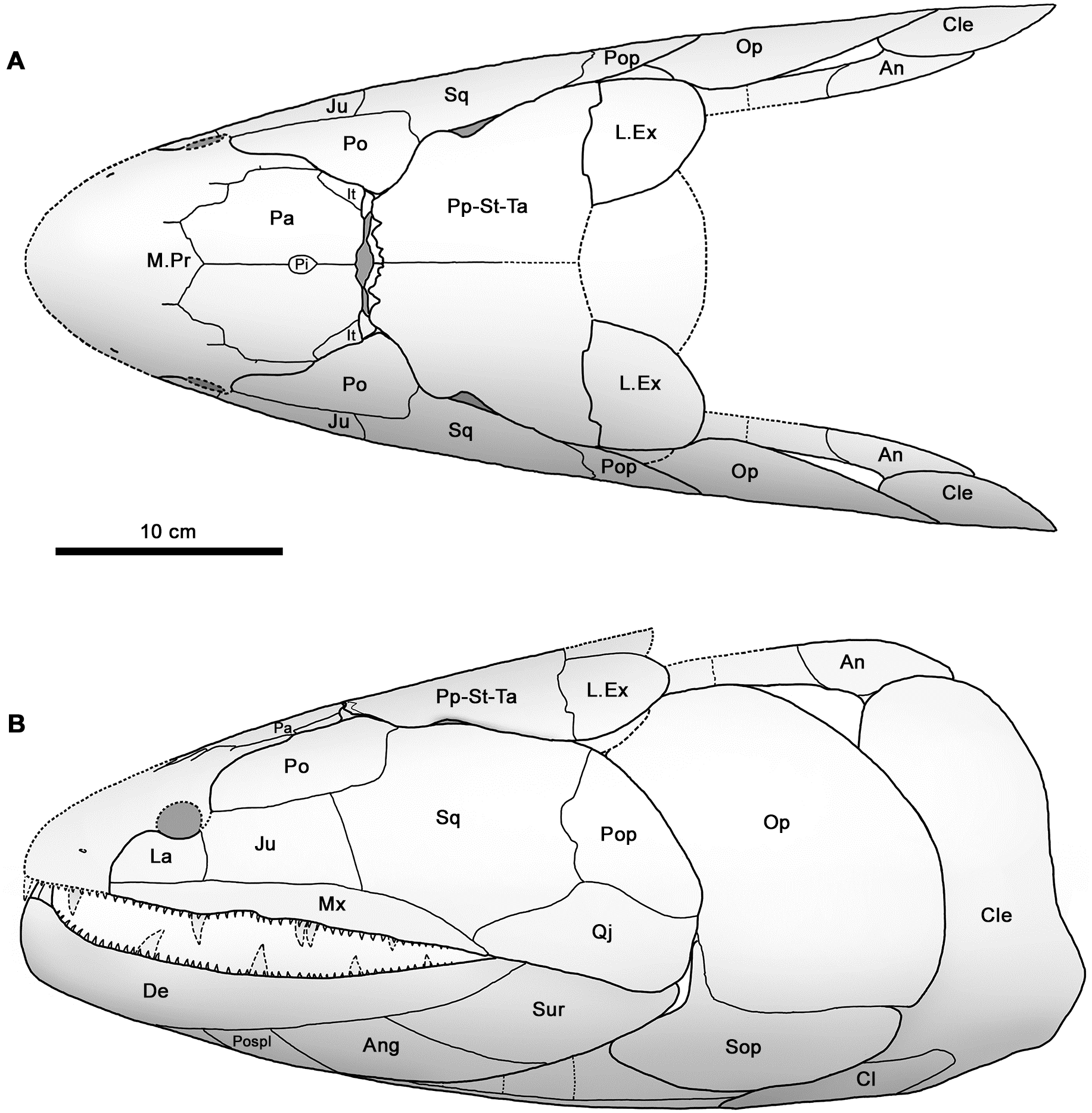
- Skull reconstruction of H. udlezinye

Scientific classification
- Kingdom: Animalia
- Phylum: Chordata
- Clade: Eotetrapodiformes
- Family: †Tristichopteridae
- Genus: †Hyneria; Thomson, 1968

Type species
- †Hyneria lindae Thomson, 1968

Other species
- †H. udlezinye Gess and Ahlberg, 2023

= Hyneria =

Hyneria Temporal range: Famennian

Extinct genus of tetrapodomorphs from the Devonian

Hyneria is a genus of large prehistoric predatory lobe-finned fish which lived in fresh water during the Famennian stage of the Devonian period.

== Etymology ==
The genus name Hyneria is a reference to the village of Hyner, Pennsylvania, near where the first specimen was found. The species epithet H. lindae is derived from the name of the wife of Keith Stewart Thomson, who described this fish.

== Description ==
Hyneria was a large fish. H. lindae is estimated around 2.5–3 metres (8.2–9.8 ft) in total length. An isolated cleithrum AM 6545 likely belongs to an individual of at least 2.7 metres (8.9 ft) in length. The largest complete jaw reaches 38 centimetres (15 in), but there is much larger fragment possibly from a jaw about twice that length, although that specimen may belong to a rhizodont instead. Assuming this jaw fragment does pertain to Hyneria, and assuming proportions similar to more complete tristichopterids, it suggests H. lindae could possibly reach lengths up to 3.5 metres (11 ft). A second species, H. udlezinye, was once estimated as having a length of between 2 and 4 metres (6.6 and 13.1 ft) before being described. However, the species description estimates that the largest specimen belongs to an animal about 3 metres (9.8 ft). Its skull had heavy, ornamented dermal bones and its lower jaw was relatively long and shallow. The teeth were stout, with those of the premaxilla forming fangs upwards of 5 cm (2 in). Its body was covered by cycloid scales. It had large sensory canals to aid in detection of possible prey, as the freshwater environment it inhabited likely was murky and had low visibility. Adult individuals retained juvenile features (i.e. partially unossified skeletons), suggesting that they were likely neotenic.

== Discovery ==
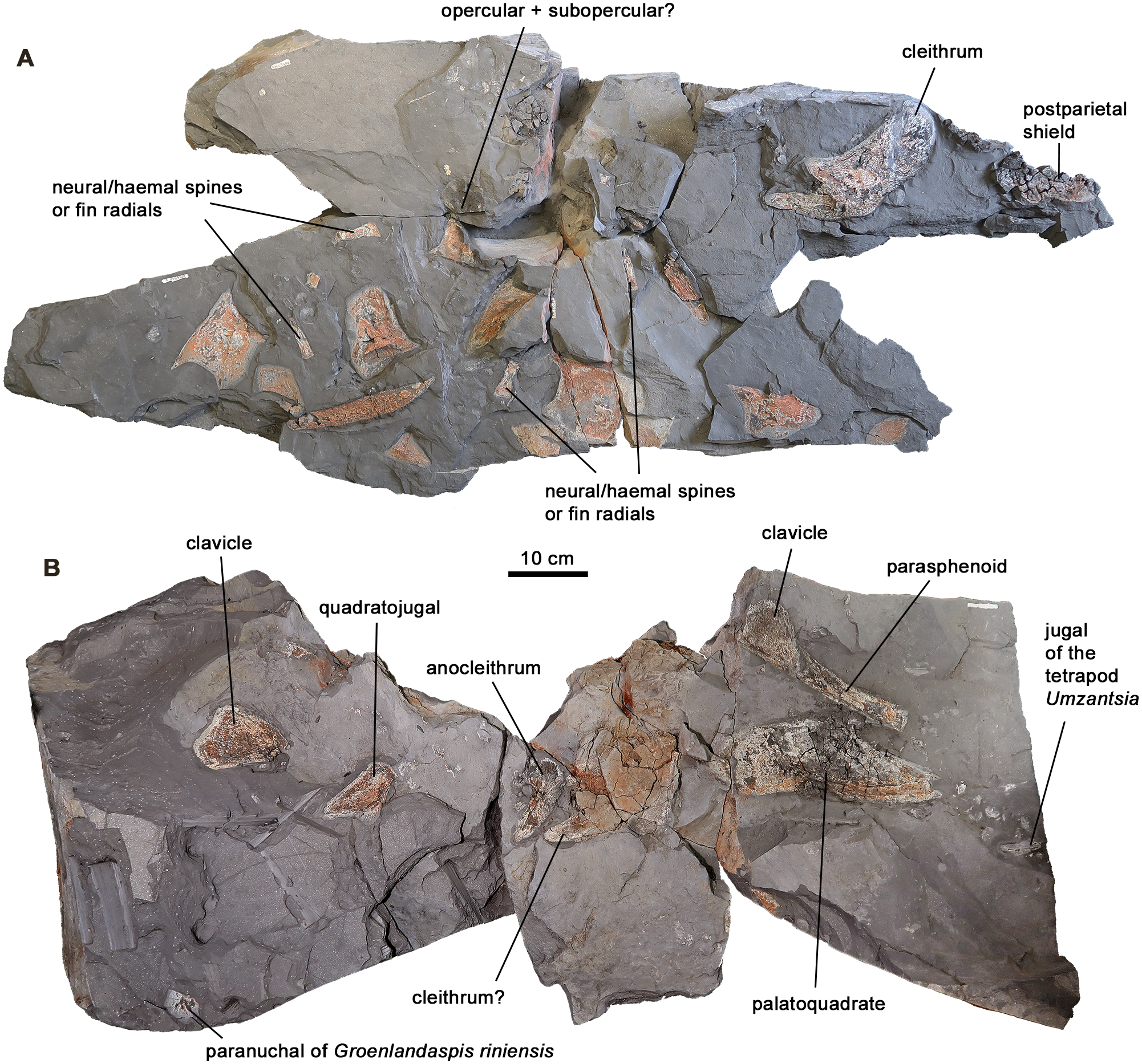
Holotype specimen of H. udlezinye

The original fossils came from two localities in Pennsylvania, United States, one found between the villages of North Bend and Hyner and another near Emporium. They consisted of a disarticulated partial skull and fragments of the shoulder girdle. The fossils were found in the Catskill Formation of the Red Hill Shale, dating to the upper Devonian. These were the only remains known until 1993 when a renewed collecting effort discovered abundant new material. Hyneria is considered the largest and most common lobe-finned fish found in the Red Hill Shale. In February 2023 a second species of Hyneria, H. udlezinye, was named from remains discovered in the Waterloo Farm lagerstätte. These remains include the skull and shoulder girdle.
