= Notorhizodon =

Notorhizodon Temporal range: Devonian

Scientific classification
- Domain: Eukaryota
- Kingdom: Animalia
- Phylum: Chordata
- Clade: Sarcopterygii
- Clade: Tetrapodomorpha
- Clade: Eotetrapodiformes
- Family: †Tristichopteridae
- Genus: †Notorhizodon; Young et al., 1992
- Species: †N. mackelveyi

Binomial name
- †Notorhizodon mackelveyi Young et al., 1992

Extinct genus of tetrapodomorphs

Notorhizodon is an extinct genus of tristichopterid tetrapodomorphs which lived during the Devonian period (Givetian stage, about 385 - 391 million years ago). Fossils have been found in Antarctica and described by Young et al. in 1992. Notorhizodon probably lived in freshwaters.
