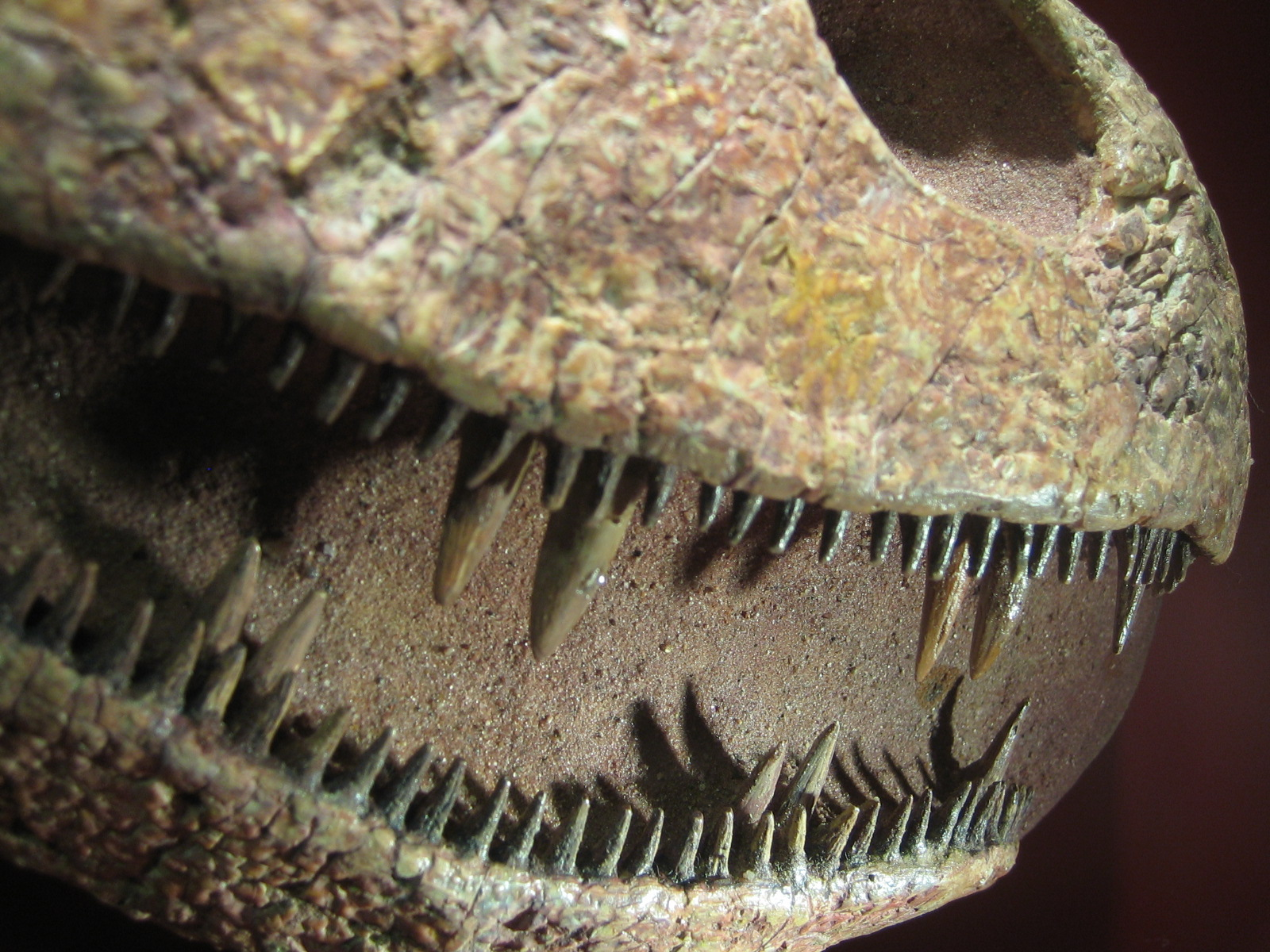
- Teeth of Platycephalichthys, in CosmoCaixa Barcelona

Scientific classification
- Kingdom: Animalia
- Phylum: Chordata
- Clade: Eotetrapodiformes
- Family: †Tristichopteridae; Cope, 1889

Genera
- †Cabonnichthys; †Canningius; †Edenopteron; †Eusthenodon; †Eusthenopteron; †Heddleichthys; †Hyneria; †Jarvikina; †Langlieria; †Mandageria; †Notorhizodon; †Platycephalichthys; †Spodichthys; †Tinirau; †Tristichopterus

Synonyms
- Eusthenopteridae Berg, 1955

= Tristichopteridae =

Tristichopteridae Temporal range: 392–359 Ma Middle - Late Devonian

Extinct family of tetrapodomorphs

Tristichopterids (Tristichopteridae) were a diverse and successful group of fish-like tetrapodomorphs living throughout the Middle and Late Devonian. They first appeared in the Eifelian stage of the Middle Devonian. Within the group sizes ranged from a few tens of centimeters (Tristichopterus) to several meters (Hyneria and Eusthenodon).

Some tristichopterids share some of the features of the elpistostegalians, a diverse clade of tetrapodomorphs close to the origin of (and including) tetrapods. This mainly concerns the shape of the skull and a reduction in size of the posterior fins.

An old and persistent notion is that Eusthenopteron was able to crawl onto land using its fins. However, there is no evidence actually supporting this idea. All tristichopterids had become extinct by the end of the Late Devonian.

== Description ==
The Tristichopteridae were medium-sized (Tristichopterus, 30 cm) to very large animals. The smallest forms (such as Tristichopterus) attained lengths of 30 cm, and the largest forms (Hyneria) could grow several meters long, possessed teeth up to 5 cm long, and were the largest predators in their faunal communities. Tristichopterids had a strongly developed fin skeleton. In the skeleton of the front fins, which were deeply attached, the elements of the forelimb of the later tetrapodomorphs, such as the humerus, ulna and radius, can already be recognized.

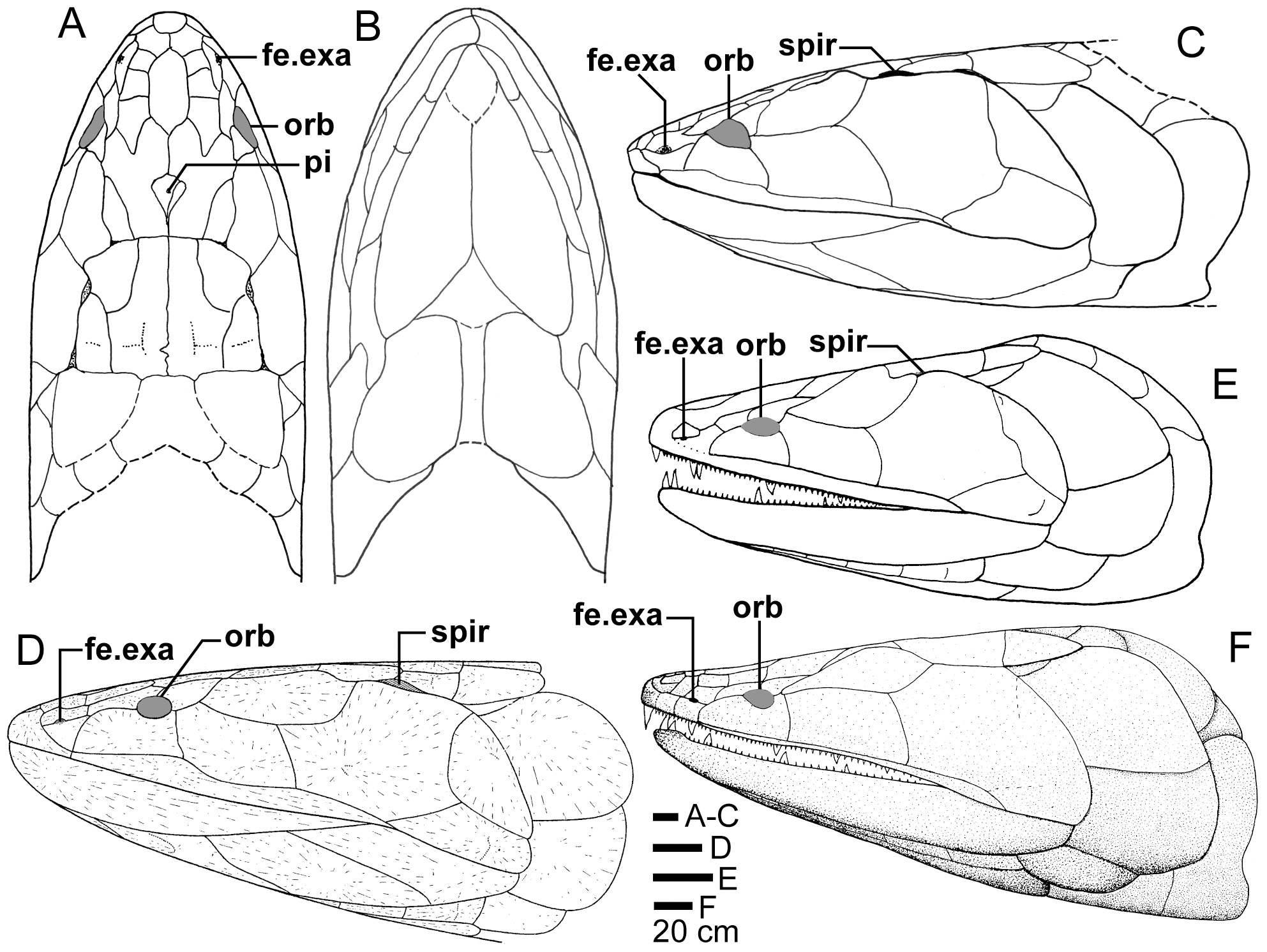
Comparisons of the skulls of three members of the Tristichopteridae: A, B, C, Edenopteron; D, Eusthenodon, E. Cabonnichthys; F, Mandageria.

The parts of the bones directed outward from the body trunk were flattened. The pelvis had long, tapering pubic branches (pubic rami) that possibly met in a cartilaginous symphysis. The ventral fins also contained the major bones of the hind legs, femur, tibia, and fibula. Ankle bones (tarsal bones) and toes cannot yet be identified. The limbs were oriented to the side and could only be moved back and forth about 20 to 25°. The anal fin sat on a basal, fleshy peduncle. The caudal fin possessed three lobes, initially asymmetrical in basal forms and becoming more symmetrical externally in later forms. The scales lacked the cosmine layer found in more primitive tetrapodomorphs. Most of the body was covered in round, overlapping elasmoid scales with a median projection on the inner side. Thicker, enlarged scales occurred on the bases of the fins. The earliest-known fossilised evidence of bone marrow has been found in Eusthenopteron, which may be the origin of bone marrow in tetrapods.

The ontogeny of the Tristichopteridae is relatively well-known, and can be somewhat reliably inferred through Eusthenopteron. Eusthenopteron differs significantly from some later Carboniferous tetrapods in the apparent absence of a recognized larval stage and a definitive metamorphosis. In even the smallest known specimen of Eusthenopteron foordi (at 29 mm), the lepidotrichia cover all of the fins, which does not happen until after metamorphosis in genera like Polyodon. This might indicate that Eusthenopteron developed directly, with the hatchling already attaining the general body form of the adult.

== Taxonomy ==
The family Tristichopteridae was named by Edward Drinker Cope in 1889, who established it as the sole family of the order Rhipidistia. In turn, Cope deemed Rhipidistia and Actinistia as the two orders forming a superorder he named Rhipidopterygia. In 1955, Lev Berg erected a family named Eusthenopteridae to include the genera Tristichopterus and Eusthenopteron, and placed this family within the order Rhizodontiformes. More genera would later be placed in Eusthenopteridae, with Vorobyeva and Obruchev (1964) stating Eusthenodon and possibly Platycephalichthys are members of this family, while Carroll (1988) added Hyneria and tentatively assigned Devonosteus and Litoptychus to the group. Currently, Eusthenopteridae is deemed a junior synonym of Tristichopteridae.

In the past, Tristichopteridae was assigned to the order Osteolepiformes, a group of tetrapodomorphs that is now considered paraphyletic.

The following phylogeny is modified from Schwartz (2012). Here, Platycephalichthys is not considered a member of the Tristichopteridae:

- Tristichopteridae
  - Spodichthys
  - - Tristichopterus
    - - Eusthenopteron
      - - Jarvikina
        - - Cabonnichthys
          - - Mandageria
            - Eusthenodon
