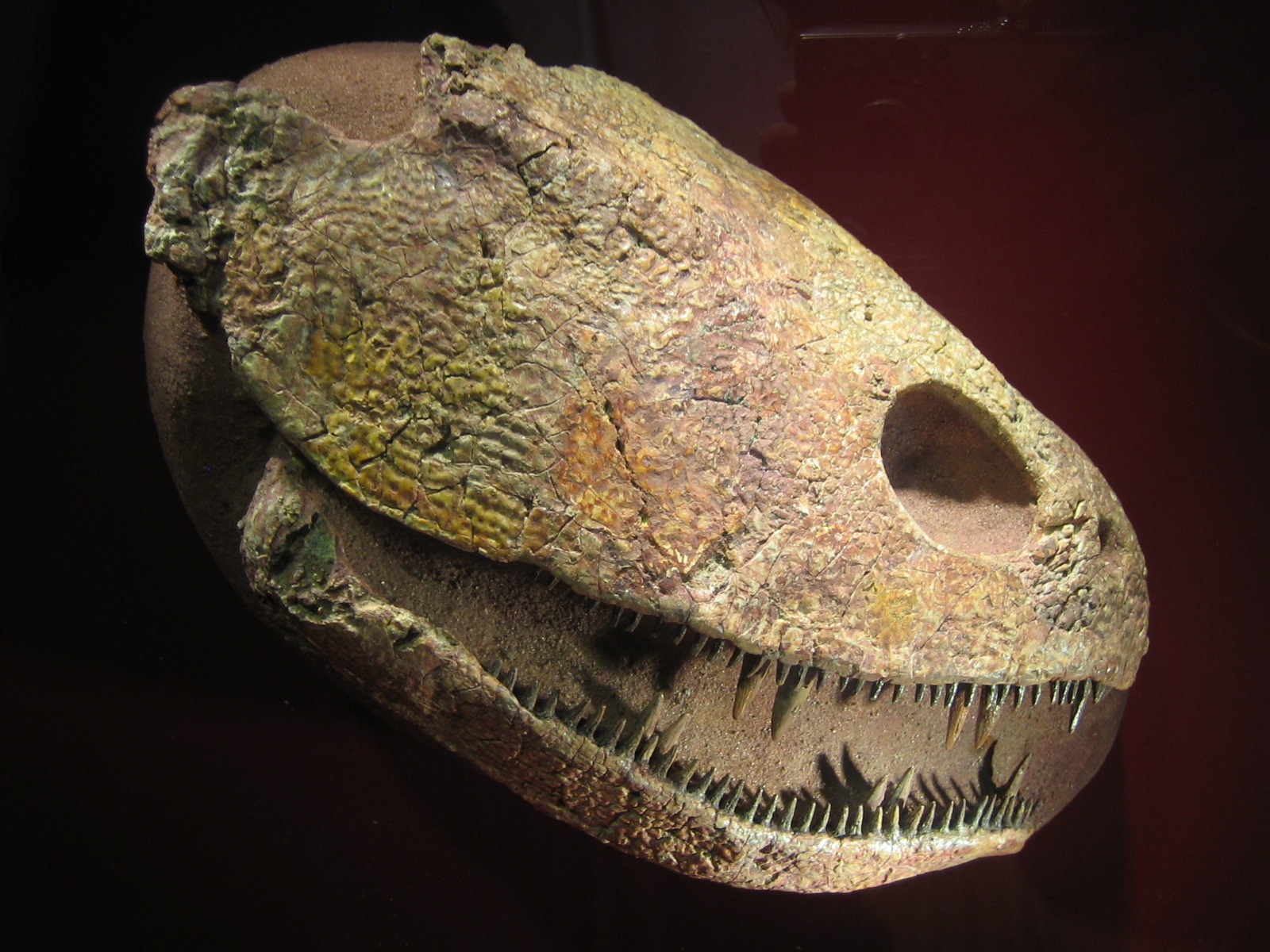
- Platycephalichthys in Cosmocaixa, Barcelona

Scientific classification
- Kingdom: Animalia
- Phylum: Chordata
- Clade: Eotetrapodiformes
- Genus: †Platycephalichthys; Vorobyeva, 1962

Species
- †P. bischoffi Vorobyeva, 1962 (type); †P. skuenicus Vorobyeva, 1977; †P. rohoni Vorobyeva, 1959

= Platycephalichthys =

Platycephalichthys Temporal range: Upper Givetian

Genus of Sarcopterygii (fish)

Platycephalichthys is a genus of tristichopterid lobe-finned fish which lived during the Upper Devonian, Frasnian stage.

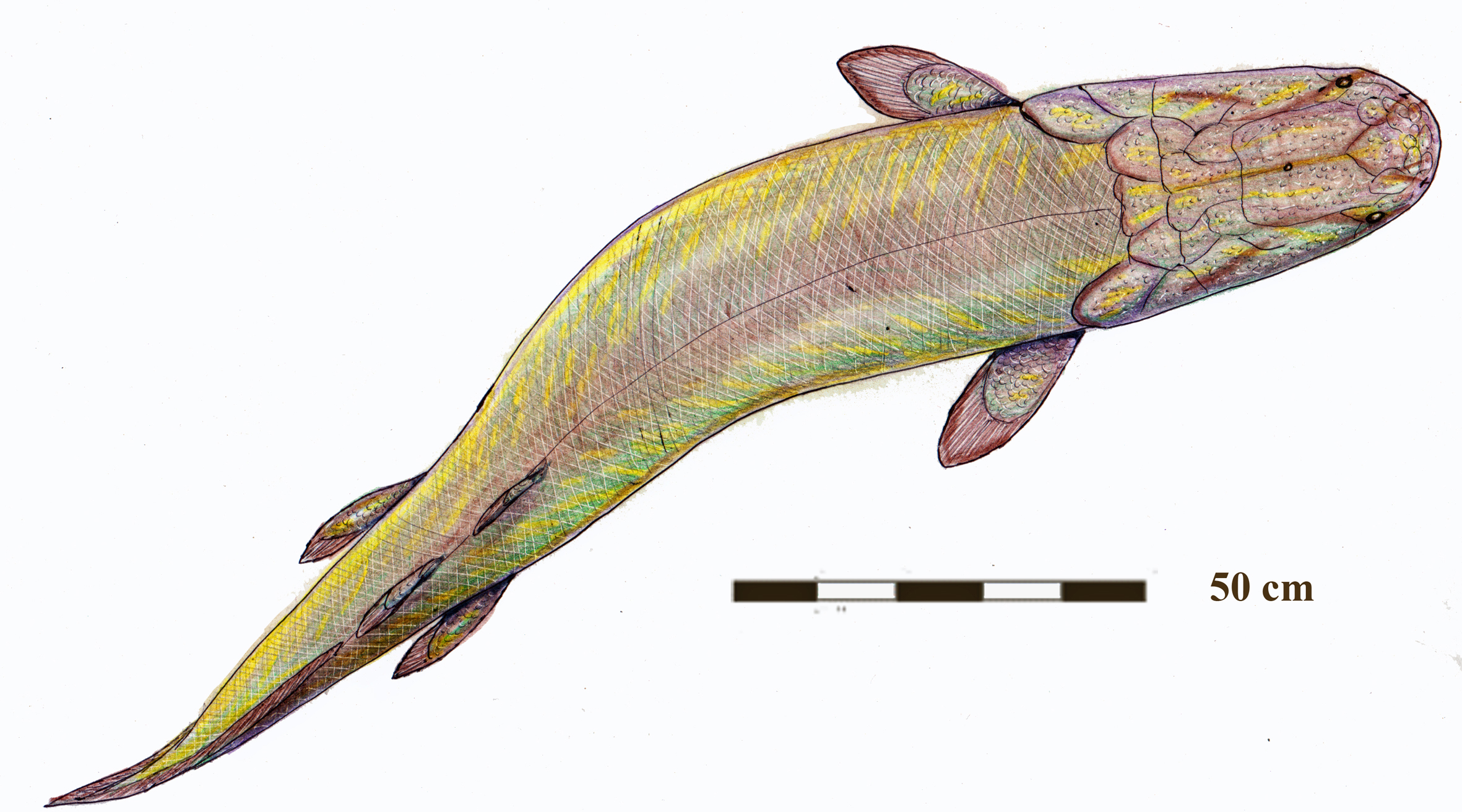
Restoration

== Phylogeny ==
Below is a cladogram from Swartz, 2012:

- Tetrapodomorpha
  - Kenichthys
  - - Rhizodontidae
    - - Canowindridae
      - - Megalichthyiformes
        - Eotetrapodiformes
          - Tristichopteridae
          - - Tinirau
            - - Platycephalichthys
              - Elpistostegalia
                - Panderichthys
                - - - Tiktaalik
                    - Elpistostege
                  - Tetrapoda
