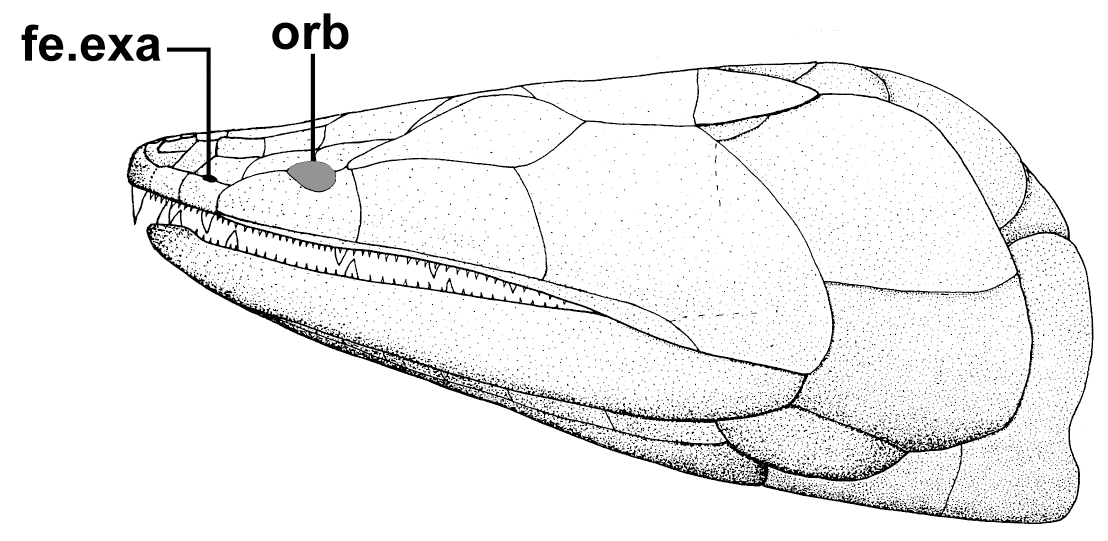
- Skull
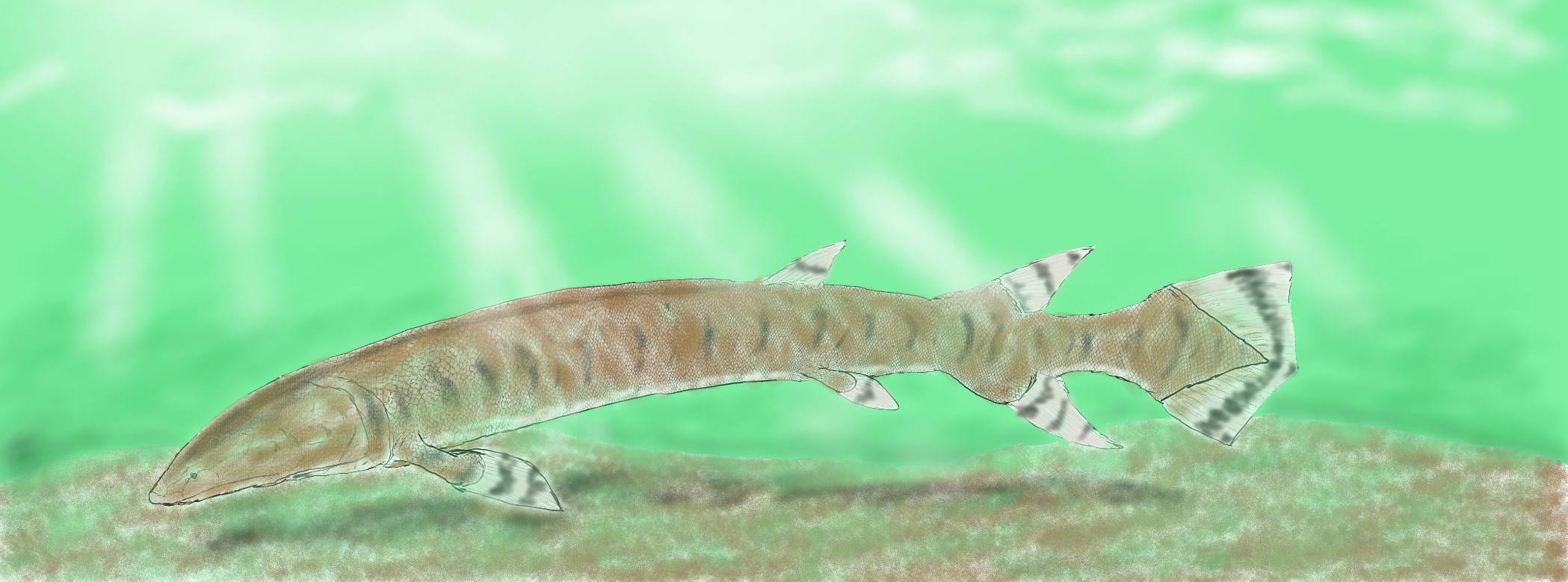
- Life restoration

Scientific classification
- Kingdom: Animalia
- Phylum: Chordata
- Clade: Eotetrapodiformes
- Family: †Tristichopteridae
- Genus: †Mandageria; Johanson & Ahlberg, 1997
- Species: †M. fairfaxi

Binomial name
- †Mandageria fairfaxi Johanson & Ahlberg, 1997

= Mandageria =

Mandageria Temporal range: Late Devonian

Extinct genus of tetrapodomorphs

Mandageria fairfaxi (Pronunciation: Man-daj-ee-ree-a fair-fax-i) is an extinct lobe-finned fish that lived during the Late Devonian period (Frasnian – Famennian). It is related to the much larger Hyneria; although Mandageria was smaller, likely hunted in a similar manner.

The generic epithet, Mandageria, refers to the Mandagery Sandstone, outcropping near Canowindra, Australia, where the fossils were found. The specific epithet, fairfaxi, honors the philanthropist James Fairfax. M. fairfaxi is the state fossil emblem for New South Wales.

== Description ==
Mandageria was a large predator about 1.6 metres (5.2 ft) long. It had a long torpedo-shaped body and large tail fins. Mandageria also had large pectoral fins which could have helped it manoeuvre around submerged logs when preparing to attack its prey. Mandageria had a functional neck joint, an otherwise uncommon feature among fish - Tiktaalik, Tarrasius, placoderms (esp. Arthrodira) and seahorses being other exceptions.
