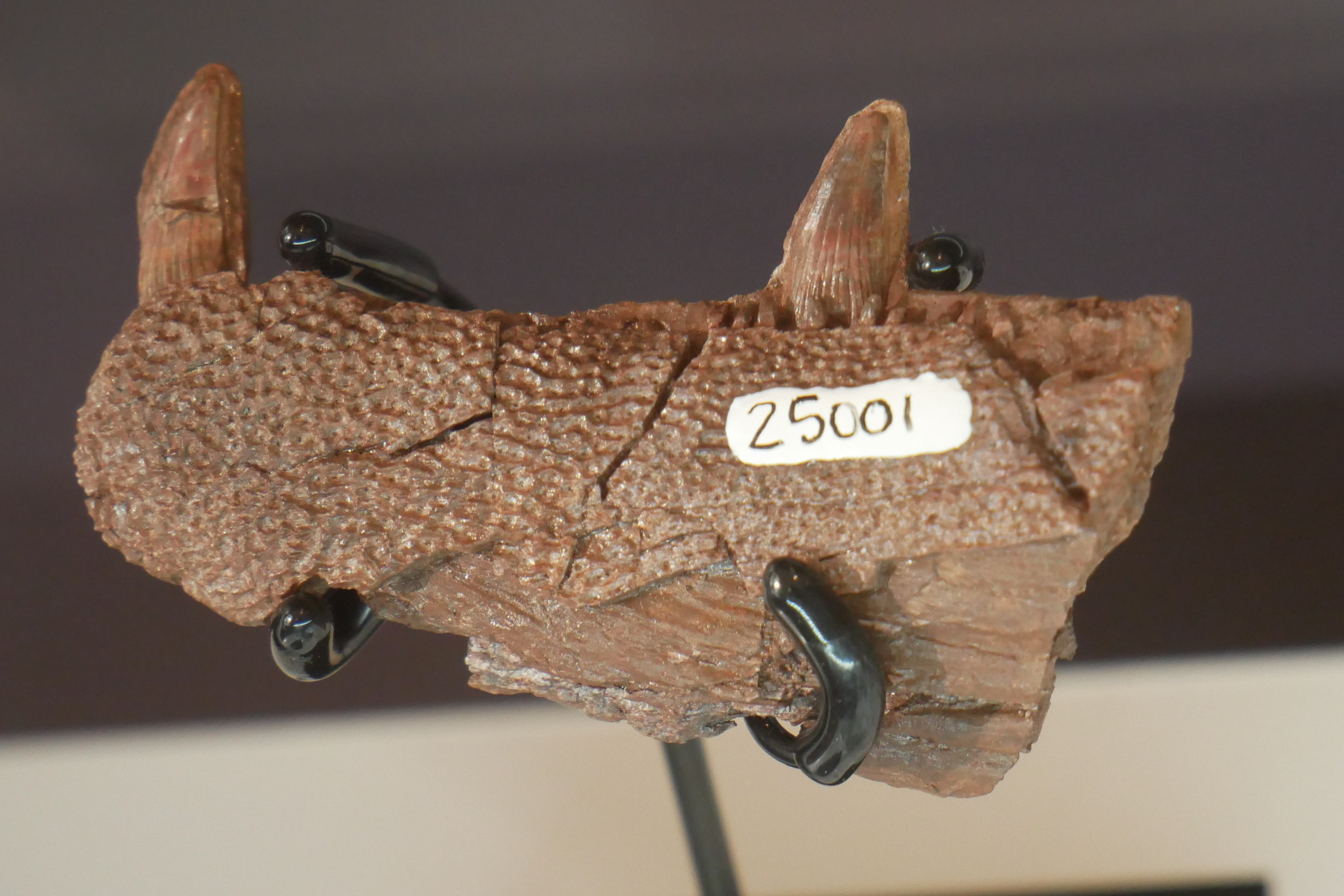
- Partial dentary, Academy of Natural Sciences of Drexel University

Scientific classification
- Domain: Eukaryota
- Kingdom: Animalia
- Phylum: Chordata
- Clade: Sarcopterygii
- Clade: Tetrapodomorpha
- Clade: Eotetrapodiformes
- Family: †Tristichopteridae
- Genus: †Langlieria; Clément et al., 2009

Type species
- Langlieria socqueti Clément et al., 2009

Species
- L. socqueti Clément et al., 2009; L. radiatus Daeschler et al., 2019

= Langlieria =

Langlieria Temporal range: Devonian (Famennian)

Extinct genus of tetrapodomorphs

Langlieria is a genus of prehistoric sarcopterygian (lobe-finned "fish"), from the end of the Devonian period (Famennian). It was discovered in Belgium and Pennsylvania.
