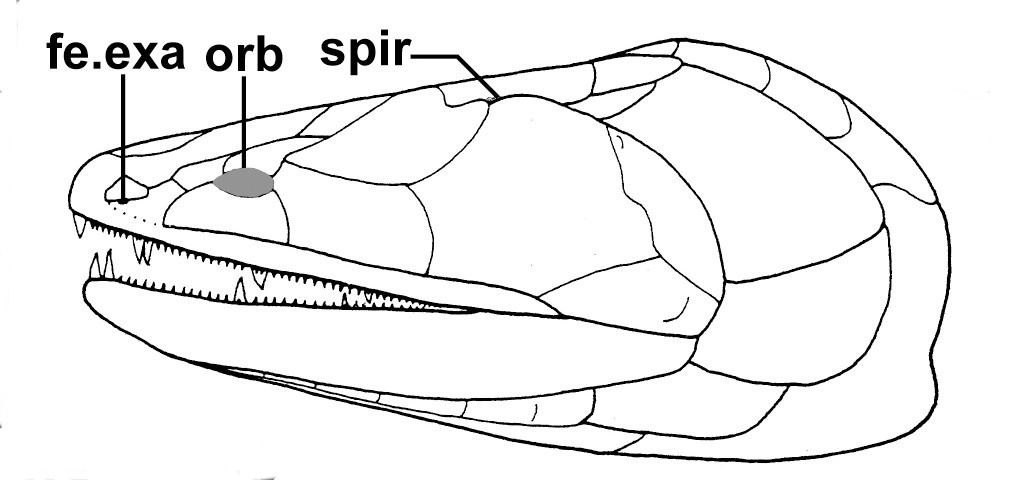
- Skull and shoulder-girdle restorations. left lateral view of Cabonnichthys burnsi

Scientific classification
- Domain: Eukaryota
- Kingdom: Animalia
- Phylum: Chordata
- Clade: Sarcopterygii
- Clade: Tetrapodomorpha
- Clade: Eotetrapodiformes
- Family: †Tristichopteridae
- Genus: †Cabonnichthys; Johanson & Ahlberg, 1997
- Species: †C. burnsi

Binomial name
- †Cabonnichthys burnsi Johanson & Ahlberg, 1997

= Cabonnichthys =

Cabonnichthys Temporal range: Late Devonian

Extinct genus of tetrapodomorphs

Cabonnichthys ("Burns' Cabonne fish") is an extinct genus of tristichopterid fish that lived in the Late Devonian period (Famennian) of Australia. It has been found in Canowindra and is a medium-sized carnivorous lobe-finned fish.
