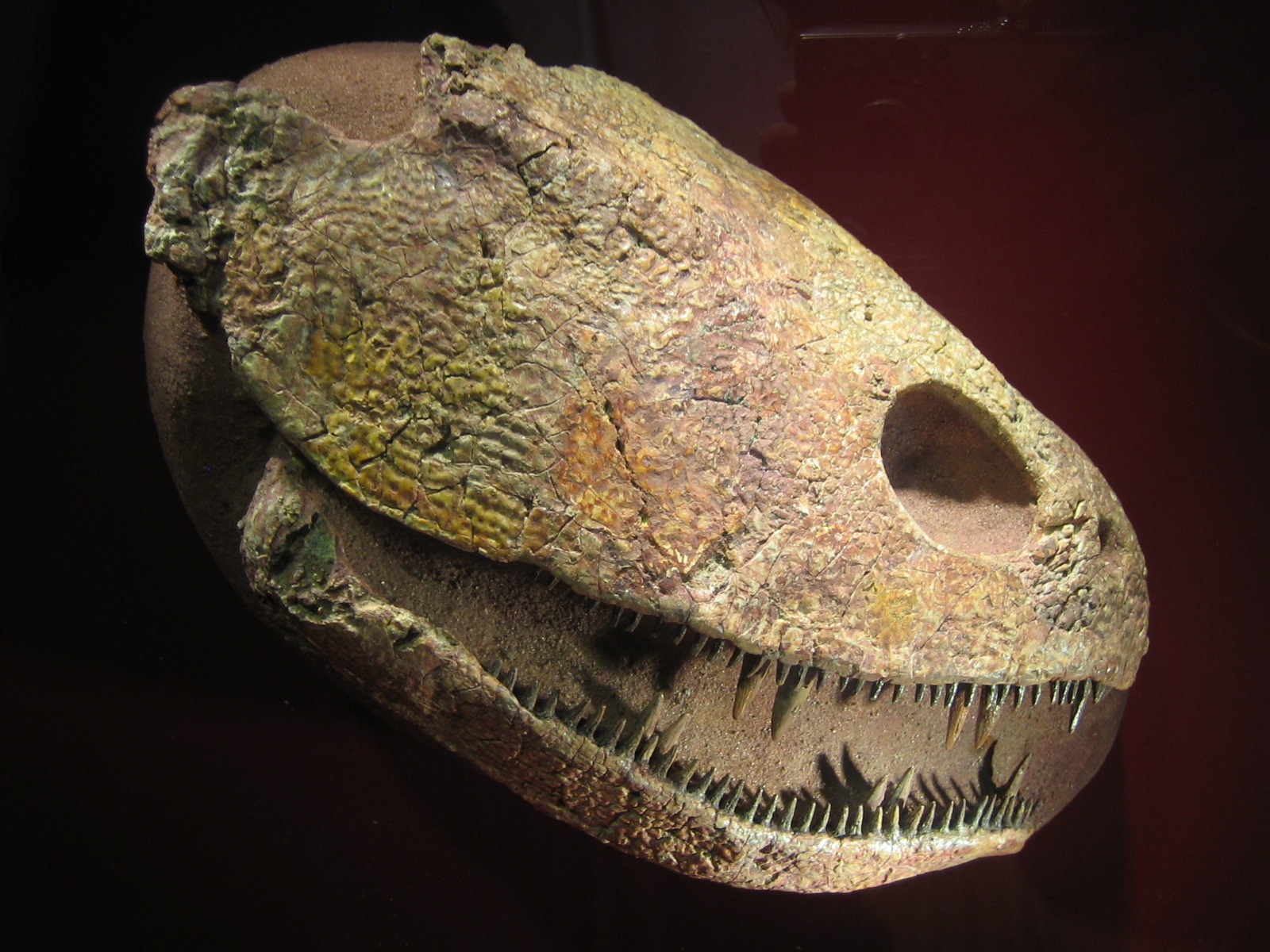
- Skull of the tristichopterid Platycephalichthys in CosmoCaixa Barcelona
- Leopard seal

Scientific classification
- Kingdom: Animalia
- Phylum: Chordata
- Clade: Tetrapodomorpha
- Clade: Eotetrapodiformes; Coates & Friedman, 2010

Subgroups
- †Tristichopteridae (possibly paraphyletic); Elpistostegalia

= Eotetrapodiformes =

Eotetrapodiformes Temporal range: Middle Devonian–Present

Clade of tetrapodomorphs

Eotetrapodiformes is an unranked clade of tetrapodomorphs including the four-limbed vertebrates ("tetrapods" in the traditional sense) and their closest finned relatives, two groups of stem tetrapods called tristichopterids and elpistostegalids.

== Description ==
This clade is defined as "the node-based clade arising from the most recent common ancestor of Eusthenopteron and Ichthyostega plus all of its descendants," for their litany of shared morphological characteristics, such as similarities in their lower jaws and endocrania. Utilizing the holotype FMNH PF 610 of the sarcopterygian Litoptychus bryanti, paleontologists highlighted the division between the ethmoid and sphenoid processes, as well as vomeral and parasphenoid processes similar to those of more derived tetrapods. Eotetrapodiformes are considered a sister taxon to Megalichthyiformes and Rhizodontida.

== History ==
The clade was named in 2010 by Michael I. Coates and Matt Friedman.

== Paleoecology ==
=== Biogeography ===
The majority of eotetrapodimorphs have been discovered from formations from southern Euramerica. The earliest tetrapodomorphs are known from China and Australia, from a time when relatively few examples had been discovered outside of East Asia and eastern Gondwana.

== Evolution ==
=== Ancestry ===
Families described in this clade evolved in the lower Devonian period 400 to 5 million years ago. And evolved into other different species. Most of the geological stages that have the highest recorded number of formations are restricted to southern Euramerica where the majority of eotetrapodiform taxa have been discovered. In Coates and Friedman's seminal paper defining eotetrapodiformes as separate from megalichthyiformes and rhizodontids, they hypothesized that though each clade diversified considerably throughout the Devonian, only the limbed tetrapods survived beyond.

Cladogram from Swartz, 2012:

- - Megalichthyiformes
  - Eotetrapodiformes
    - Tristichopteridae
    - - Tinirau
      - - Platycephalichthys
        - Elpistostegalia
          - Panderichthys
          - - - Tiktaalik
              - Elpistostege
            - - Elginerpeton
              - - Ventastega
                - - Acanthostega
                  - - Ichthyostega
                    - - Whatcheeriidae
                      - - Colosteidae
                        - - Crassigyrinus
                          - - Baphetidae
                            - Tetrapoda (Crown group)
