= Aztecia =

Aztecia Temporal range: Givetian–Frasnian

Scientific classification
- Kingdom: Animalia
- Phylum: Chordata
- Class: †Rhizodontida
- Order: †Rhizodontiformes
- Genus: †Aztecia; Johanson & Ahlberg, 2001

Type species
- †Aztecia mahalae Johanson & Ahlberg, 2001

Extinct genus of tetrapodomorphs

Aztecia is an extinct genus of basal tetrapodomorphs. It belonged to Rhizodontida, one of the earliest-diverging tetrapodomorph clades. A. mahalae comes from the Aztec Siltstone in Victoria Land, Antarctica, dating back to the Middle Devonian–Late Devonian. The genus name Aztecia refers to the Aztec Siltstone where the specimens were recovered, and the species epithet mahalae refers to the British palaeontologist Mahala Andrews who worked on rhizodontid fish.

== History ==
In 1992, a mandible associated with pectoral girdle material was described as Notorhizodon. It was identified as a rhizodontid on the basis of the pectoral girdle material. However, the morphology of the mandible is very different from other Rhizodontida. In 2001, the pectoral material was separated from the mandible material as a new rhizodontid species, Aztecia mahalae.

== Description ==
Aztecia was a small rhizodont. It is known from a humerus, a clavicle and a cleithrum. Aztecia differs from other rhizodontid by having a humerus with a wide preaxial flange and a cleithurm with a narrow, recessed flange along the posterior margin.

== Phylogeny ==
The cladogram presented below show a possible position of Aztecia among Rhizodontida. It is based on a 2012 study by Jeffery:

- Rhizodontida
  - Gooloogongia
  - - - Aztecia
      - Sauripterus
    - - Barameda
      - - Strepsodus
        - - Rhizodus
          - Screbinodus
