= Ballagan Formation =

Geological formation in Scotland

- Stratigraphic range: Tournaisian–Visean
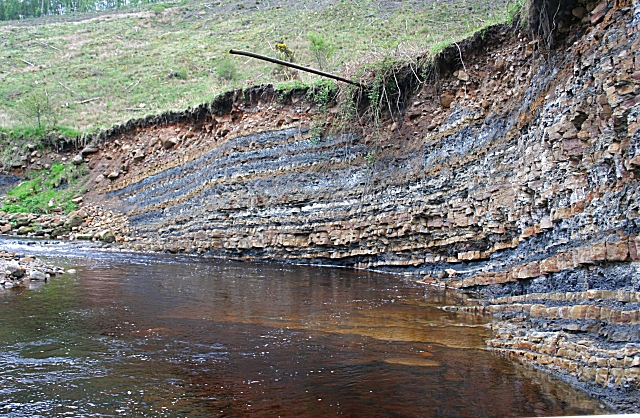
- Exposure of alternating siltstone and dolomite layers of the Ballagan Formation in the bank of Tarras Water
- Type: Formation
- Unit of: Inverclyde Group
- Underlies: Clyde Sandstone Formation
- Overlies: Kinnesswood Formation
- Area: Central Lowlands, Northern England
- Thickness: ~900 m

Lithology
- Primary: mudstone, cementstone, siltstone
- Other: sandstone

Location
- Region: Scotland
- Country: United Kingdom

Type section
- Named for: Ballagan Glen
- Named by: Browne, 1980

The Ballagan Formation is a geologic formation in Scotland and England. It preserves fossils dating back to the early part of the Carboniferous period (Tournaisian – early Visean). Its name comes from the "Ballagan Beds" of Ballagan Glen, near Strathblane, which has a good example of this geological formation.

The Ballagan Formation was historically known as the Cementstone Group, but more recently it has been placed as the middle formation of the Inverclyde Group. This change was motivated by the recognition that the youngest parts of the Devonian Upper Old Red Sandstone (now known as the Kinnesswood Formation) were geologically continuous with the lowest parts of the Lower Carboniferous Calciferous Sandstone Measures (now known as the Ballagan and Clyde Sandstone formations). This interval of Devonian-Carboniferous overlap was named the Inverclyde Group, and the cementstone-rich "drab beds" in the middle of the group were renamed to the Ballagan Formation. In Lothian, the Ballagan and Clyde Sandstone formations are sometimes known as the Tyninghame Formation.

== Fossil sites ==
Many localities of the Ballagan Formation preserve exceptional fossils. The majority of fossiliferous sites are in the Midland Valley (particularly the Scottish Borders and East Lothian), in the southeast corner of Scotland.

One of the earliest sites to be studied was the fish bed at Foulden, which hosts many well-preserved fish fossils, notably including endemic actinopterygians (ray-finned fish) and the first complete skeleton of a rhizodont. Plants and arthropods also form a significant portion of Foulden fossils. This site and its fish fossils were publicized by E.I. White in 1927, and further excavations were performed by Stan Wood in 1980-1981. The Foulden fish bed was the primary theme for volume 76 of the Transactions of the Royal Society of Edinburgh: Earth Sciences journal, published in 1985.

Willie's Hole, near Chirnside, is another site known for its high quality of preservation. It was initially recognized for its crustacean fossils, forming "shrimp beds" akin to those observed throughout the later Scottish Carboniferous. Willie's Hole has continued to produce well-preserved fossils of arthropods, fish, and partial tetrapod skeletons.

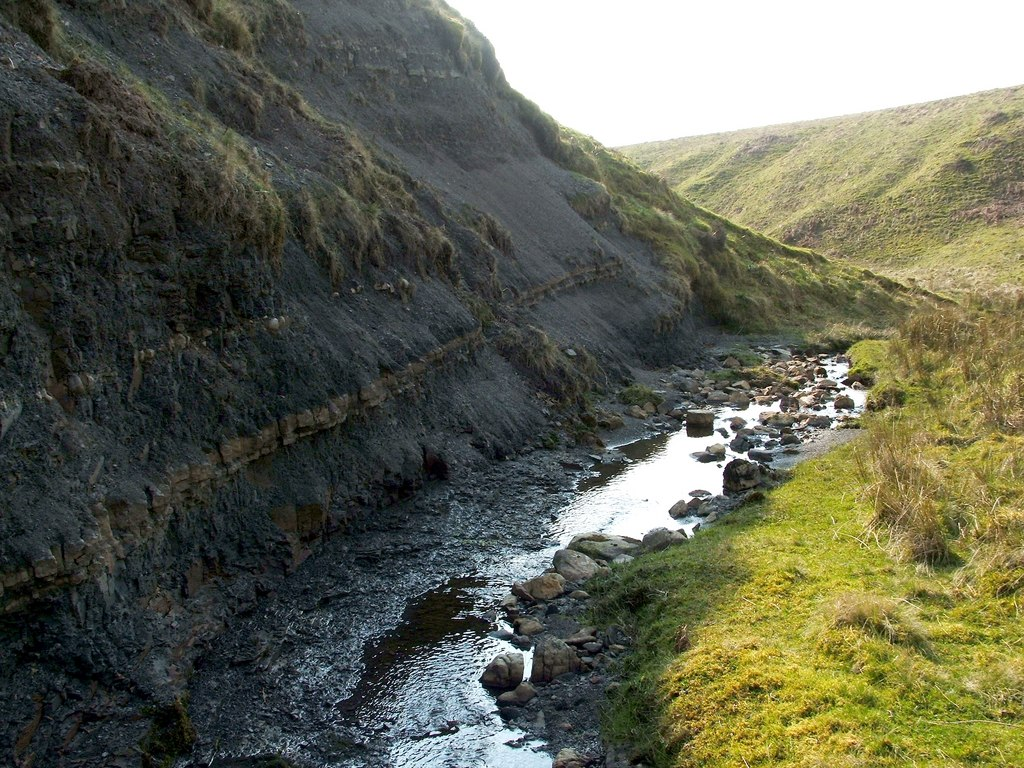
Ballagan Formation outcrop at Spouts Burn, in southwest Scotland near Auchenrock Glen and Dumbarton

By far the largest exposures of the Ballagan Formation occur along the coastal end cliffs of Burnmouth. Tetrapod, fish, and arthropod fragments are common in several layers at Burnmouth, not just in fine-grained overbank deposits but also coarse river channel conglomerates, an unusual mode of preservation.

Tetrapod fossils have been found in the vicinity of Tantallon Castle. Additional Midland Valley sites include Crumble Edge (along Whiteadder Water), Coldstream, Cockburnspath, Cove (in Berwickshire), and Whitrope Burn (near Hawick). A few locales in nearby Northumberland, England encompass fossil-bearing outcrops of the Ballagan Formation, such as Berwick-upon-Tweed Barrow Scar (near Alwinton), and a borehole core at Norham.

Some sites are also found along the west coast of Scotland. Auchenreoch Glen, near Dumbarton, was the collection site for the nearly complete type fossil of Pederpes finneyae, which was the oldest named tetrapod of the Carboniferous upon its discovery. Diverse assemblages of fish teeth and other microfossils have been found at Ayrshire and at Hawk's Nib and Mill Hole, on the Isle of Bute.

== Paleobiota ==
The Ballagan Formation preserves a plethora of tetrapod, fish, and invertebrate fossils, reconstructing one of the most diverse continental ecosystems known from the Tournaisian stage. A variety of plant megafossils and spores are known from the Ballagan Formation.

=== Tetrapods ===
- Aytonerpeton microps
- Diploradus austiumensis
- Koilops herma
- Mesanerpeton woodi
- Ossirarus kierani
- Pederpes finneyae (Whatcheeriidae)
- Perittodus apsconditus
- Tantallognathus woodi
- UMZC 2011.7.2: A small unnamed five-fingered tetrapod similar to Gephyrostegus and Silvanerpeton
- SPW 4165 ("Ribbo"): A large unnamed tetrapod with robust ribs and limbs
- Crassigyrinus-like bone fragments
- An Eogyrinus-like tetrapod scute
- Indeterminate Tetrapoda and Whatcheeriidae fragments.

=== Fish ===
- Acanthodii ("spiny sharks"): Acanthodes ovensi (Acanthodidae), Gyracanthus sp. (Gyracanthidae), and rare indeterminate Climatiiformes.
- Actinisitia (coelacanths): cf. Rhabdoderma
- Actinopterygii (ray-finned fish): Aetheretmon valentiacum (Strepheoschemidae), Cosmoptychius striatus (Cosmoptychiidae), Phanerosteon ovensi (Carbovelidae), Strepheoschema fouldenensis (Strepheoschemidae), Styracopterus fulcratus (Styracopteridae)
- Chondrichthyes (cartilaginous fish): Ageleodus pectinatus, Cladodus sp. (Ctenacanthiformes?), Cooleyella sp. (Anachronistidae), Deihim sp. (Protacrodontidae), Deltodus tubineus (Cochliodontidae), Harpagofututor sp. (Chondrenchelyidae), Helodus ?simplex (Helodontiformes), Onychoselache (shark fin spines), Platyxystrodus sps. (Chondrenchelyidae), Protacrodus sp. (Protacrodontidae), Whitropus longicalcus (Cochliodontiformes)
- Dipnoans (lungfish): Ballagadus caustrimi, Ballagadus rossi, Coccovedus cellatus, Ctenodus roberti, Ctenodus whitropei, Ctenodus williei, Limanichthys fraseri, Occludus romeri, Uronemus splendens, Xylognathus macrustenus
- Megalichthyidae: ?Megalichthys sp.
- Rhizodonts: cf. Archichthys portlocki, Strepsodus? anculomanensis, cf. Strepsodus sauroides, Rossichthys clackae. A distinctive yet unnamed rhizodont recovered in 2016 may be the most complete member of the group ever found, though only the skull has been described as of 2025.
- Indeterminate Actinopterygii.
- Indeterminate Chondrichthyes, including Helodontidae, Psephodontidae, Cochliodontiformes, Protacrodontidae, Holocephali, Xenacanthiformes, Hybodontiformes, ctenacanths, and Menaspiformes.
- Indeterminate fragments of lungfish and rhizodonts, some estimated up to 3 meters or 10 feet in length.

=== Invertebrates ===
- Eumalacostracan crustaceans ("shrimps"): Bairdops elegans (Permimecturidae), Belotelson traquairi (Belotelsonidae), Dithyocaris, Pseudogalathea, Pseudotealliocaris etheridgei, Tealliocaris
- Millipedes: Woodesmus sheari and at least five other millipede taxa, including members of Archipolypoda, Juliformia, and Euphoberiidae
- Xiphosurans (horseshoe crabs): Albalimulus bottoni (Limulidae), Rolfeia fouldenensis (Paleolimulidae)
- Scorpions: Trachyscorpio squarrosus (Eoscorpiidae) (includes specimens that were identified as Gigantoscorpio cf. willsi)
- Eurypterids: "Cyrtoctenus" (Hibbertopterus) peachi (Hibbertopteridae)
- Polyurida aenigmatica, an enigmatic worm-like animal initially mistaken for a myriapod
- "Spirorbiform" microconchids, initially mistaken for Spirorbis polychaete worm tubes
- Ostracods
- Bivalves: Modiolus latus (Mytilidae), Naiadites, Schizodus
- Gastropods
- Brachiopods

== See also ==
- List of fossiliferous stratigraphic units in Scotland
