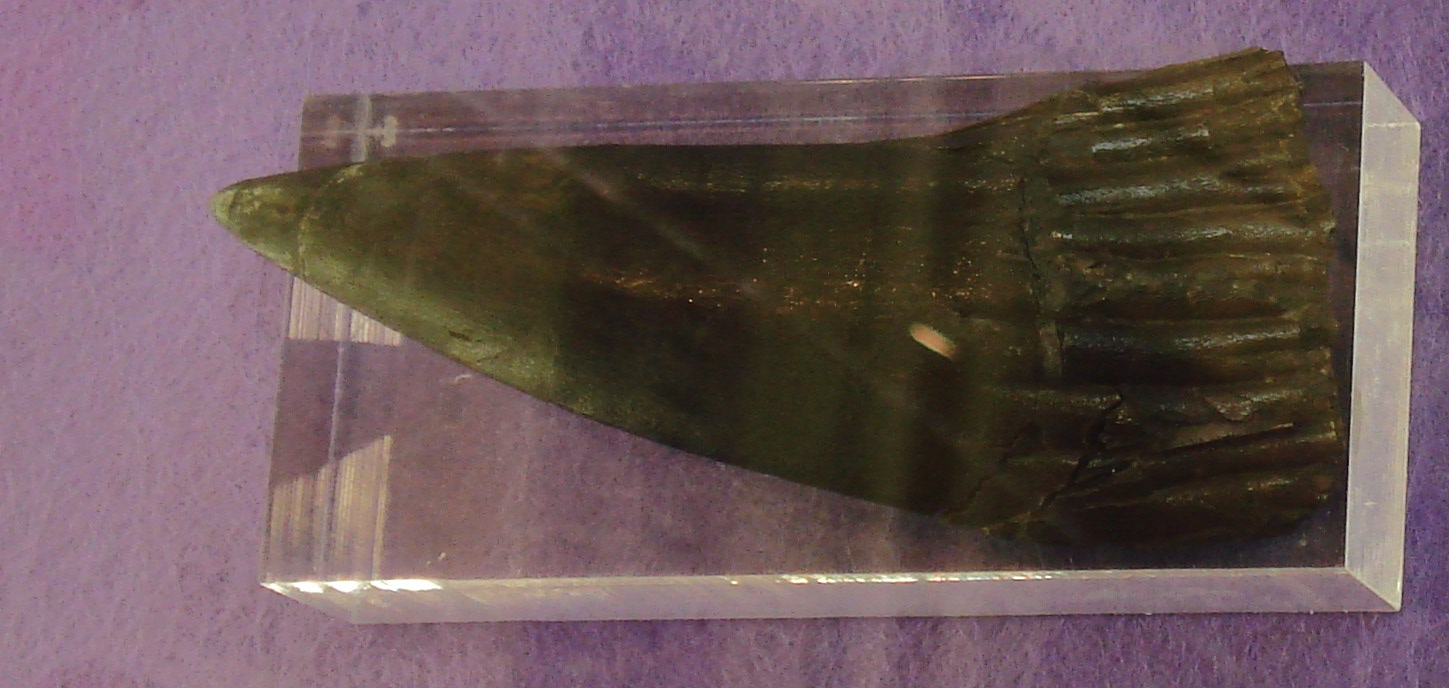
- Fossil tooth of Rhizodus hibberti

Scientific classification
- Kingdom: Animalia
- Phylum: Chordata
- Class: †Rhizodontida
- Order: †Rhizodontiformes
- Family: †Rhizodontidae
- Genus: †Rhizodus; Owen, 1840

Type species
- †Rhizodus hibberti Owen, 1840

Other species
- †R. serpukhovensis Smirnova, 2022

= Rhizodus =

Rhizodus Temporal range: Visean–Serpukhovian Possible Tournaisian material

Extinct genus of tetrapodomorphs

Rhizodus ("root tooth") is an extinct genus of basal, finned tetrapodomorphs (the group of sarcopterygians that contains modern tetrapods and their extinct relatives). It belonged to Rhizodontida, one of the earliest-diverging tetrapodomorph clades. Two valid species have been described, both of which lived during the Early Carboniferous epoch. The type species R. hibberti is known from the Viséan stage of the United Kingdom, whereas the species R. serpukhovensis is from the Serpukhovian of Russia. Some fossils referred to the genus Rhizodus have also been found in North America.

== History ==
A partial lower jaw attributed to a rhizodontiform, PIN no. 2878/581, was discovered in 2000 in the Zaborie quarry of Serpukhovsky District, Russia. The specimen consists of the middle part of the lower jaw, which includes the two coronoid fangs as well as marginal teeth. In 2022, it was formally described as the holotype of the new species R. serpukhovensis. Dating from the Serpukhovian, it was as of 2022 the youngest known specimen of Rhizodus, and the first known from Russia.

No near-complete adult skeleton of Rhizodus has been found, and the known material is limited to isolated fragments. Given explanations include taphonomic bias due to large body size, but also weak endochondral ossification in rhizodontids, and a lack of strong cranial sutures between skull bones.

== Description ==
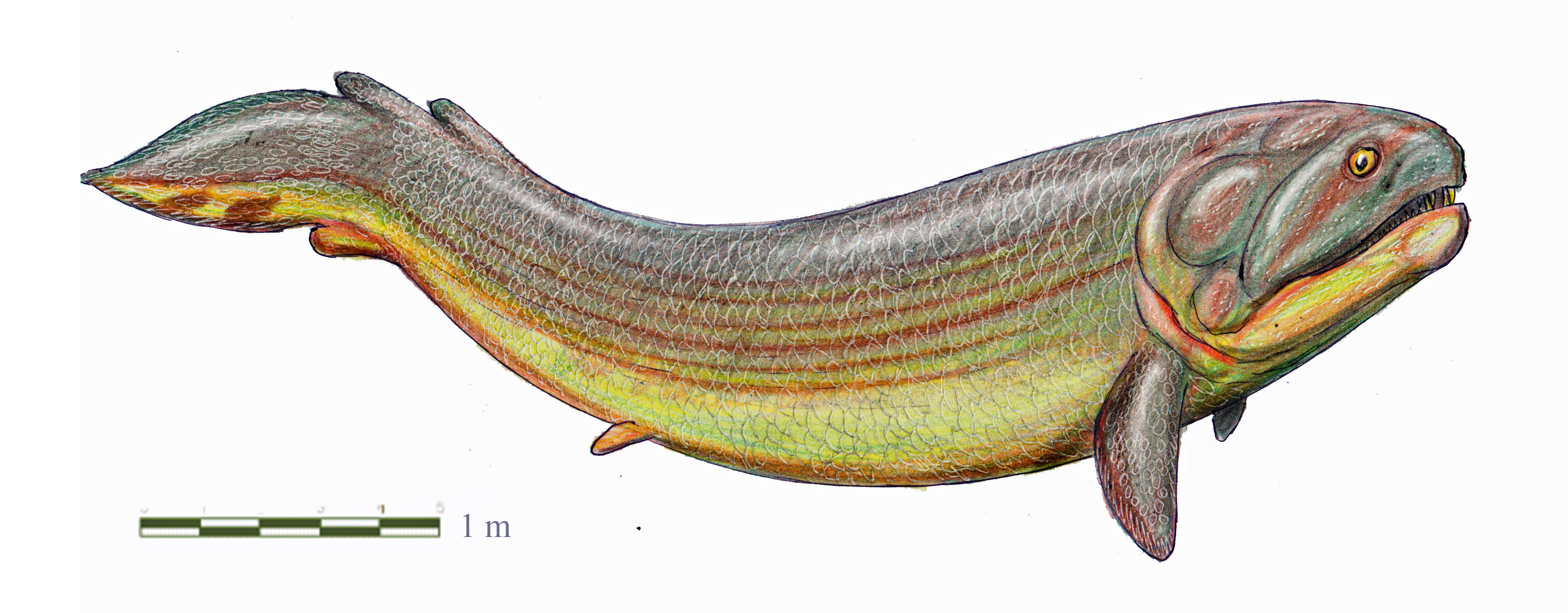
Restoration of R. hibberti

The most notable characteristics of Rhizodus, compared to other giant rhizodonts such as Barameda, were the two 22-centimetre (8.7 in) fangs located near the front of its jaws, followed by other teeth scaling downwards in size. Rhizodus was a giant apex predator that resided in freshwater lakes, river systems and large swamps, with R. hibberti measuring 5.14–5.63 metres (16.9–18.5 ft) long and weighing 1–1.5 metric tons (1.1–1.7 short tons). It fed on small to medium-sized amphibians, using its teeth to kill prey and rip it into digestible sizes, rather than swallowing prey whole like other, smaller-toothed sarcopterygians.

Fossil skin imprints show that Rhizodus had large, plate-like scales, similar to those found on modern day arapaima.

In Rhizodus, the pelvic fins consisted of a femur articulating with three radial bones. This is unlike modern sarcopterygians and other known fossils, where the femur articulates with two bones, the tibia and fibula, which is believed to be the basal condition. The femur and the three radial bones in Rhizodus are thought to originate respectively from the stylopod and zeugopod, although without homology between the individual radials in Rhizodus and those in other tetrapods. The pectoral fins comprised a humerus articulating with a radius and ulna, making them closer to the tetrapod condition.

== Taxonomy ==
Rhizodus is part of the eponymous clade Rhizodontida, usually considered to be an early-diverging tetrapodomorph branch. However, the discovery of Hongyu in 2017, showing a mosaic of rhizodont-like and tetrapod-like characters, has questioned this placement. The phylogeny below comes from a study performed by Clement et al. in 2021, which recovered Rhizodontida as basal tetrapodomorphs positioned crownwards of Kenichthys and Tungsenia.

- Rhizodontida
  - Hongyu
  - - Gooloogongia
    - - Sauripterus
      - Barameda
      - - Screbinodus
        - - Strepsodus
          - Rhizodus

While the genera Rhizodus, Strepsodus and Archichthys are considered well-established, distinguishing characters focus on the symphysial tusks, leaving identification of other material more uncertain due to the fragmentary nature of remains. A 2020 study by Johanson et al. suggested dividing rhizodont humeri into four morphogroups. Morphogroup III specimens, characterized by a large preaxial process extending dorso-ventrally, were identified with Rhizodus, tentatively extending the range of the genus to the Tournaisian.

== Diet ==
The diet of Rhizodus included medium-sized fish and tetrapods. It has been proposed that Rhizodus lunged at terrestrial, shorebound prey, just like a modern-day crocodile.
