= Letognathus =

Letognathus Temporal range: Early Carboniferous

Scientific classification
- Domain: Eukaryota
- Kingdom: Animalia
- Phylum: Chordata
- Clade: Sarcopterygii
- Clade: Tetrapodomorpha
- Class: †Rhizodontida
- Order: †Rhizodontiformes
- Family: †Rhizodontidae
- Genus: †Letognathus; Brazeau, 2005

Type species
- Letognathus hardingi (Dawson, 1868)

Synonyms
- Rhizodus hardingi (Dawson, 1868); Strepsodus hardingi (Dawson, 1868)

Extinct genus of tetrapodomorphs

Letognathus is a genus of rhizodont tetrapodomorph that lived during the Carboniferous period. Its remains come from the Blue Beach Member of the Horton Bluff Formation, near Hantsport, Nova Scotia. Like most rhizodonts, it was of relatively large size, had a large recurved fang at the symphysis of the lower jaw, and a row of three coronoid fangs along the length of the jaw in addition to its marginal dentition. Letognathus is important for rhizodont systematics because it retains a number of primitive features, such as ossified Meckel's cartilage, are not found in the genera Rhizodus and Strepsodus.

== Taxonomic History ==
The members of the Rhizodontida have nearly all had complex taxonomic histories due to earlier use of the genus Strepsodus as a wastebasket taxon. The taxon was originally assigned to the genus Rhizodus by John William Dawson and later to Strepsodus by Arthur Smith Woodward. A new genus was erected for the Horton Bluff material based on a number of differences from either Strepsodus or Rhizodus.
