= Blue Beach =

Coastline in Nova Scotia, Canada

Coordinates: 45°05′54″N 64°12′54″W

Blue Beach is a 2 kilometres (1.2 mi) stretch of cliff-bordered coastline at Avonport, Nova Scotia near the mouth of the along the Avon River in the southern bight of Minas Basin, Kings County, Nova Scotia, Canada. It is best known as a globally significant fossil location for Lagerstätte of the Tournaisian Stage (Lower Carboniferous) period.

== Geographic setting ==
Blue Beach is informally named. The name relates to the bluish-black colour of the cliffs. It stretches from a small creek to Avonport Station. The tidal range in this part of Minas Basin may be as high as 16 metres (52 ft). The nearest town is Hantsport, approximately 5 kilometres (3.1 mi) to the south. The beach is accessible on foot from the end of the Blue Beach Road or from Avonport Station. There is a small private museum near the parking lot before the trail to the beach. It contains numerous excellent and important examples of fossils from the beach.

The tides make for dangerous conditions because visitors can find themselves trapped. Visitors should familiarize themselves with the Hantsport tide table (see external references). In addition to the tides, the cliffs are quite fragile with rocks regularly giving way. Care should be taken when approaching the cliffs due to the potential of rockfall and earth flows.

== Geologic setting ==
The section is exposed in rocks of the Carboniferous Maritimes Basin. The Maritimes Basin opened and filled between ca. 360 Ma and 325 Ma.

The Blue Beach cliffs consist of soft shales and sandstones of the Horton Group. They erode rapidly because of the high tides in combination with winter freeze-thaw and ice shaving conditions, thus continuously creating opportunities for new discoveries. Closer to the trail and lower in the sequence is the Blue Beach Member and further along is the Hurd Creek Member.

Blue Beach is the type locality for the apparent gap in the tetrapod fossil record known as Romer's gap. Sir William Logan, the first Director of the Geological Survey of Canada, found footprints from a tetrapod in 1841. It remains one of very few such outcrops in the world; the others are in Scotland. In recent decades, numerous tetrapod fossils dating from the earliest Carboniferous have been found.

== Flora ==
Flora include Lepidodendron, Calamites, Aneimites, Diplotnema, Carpolithus, Genselina. In addition, countless spores can be found.

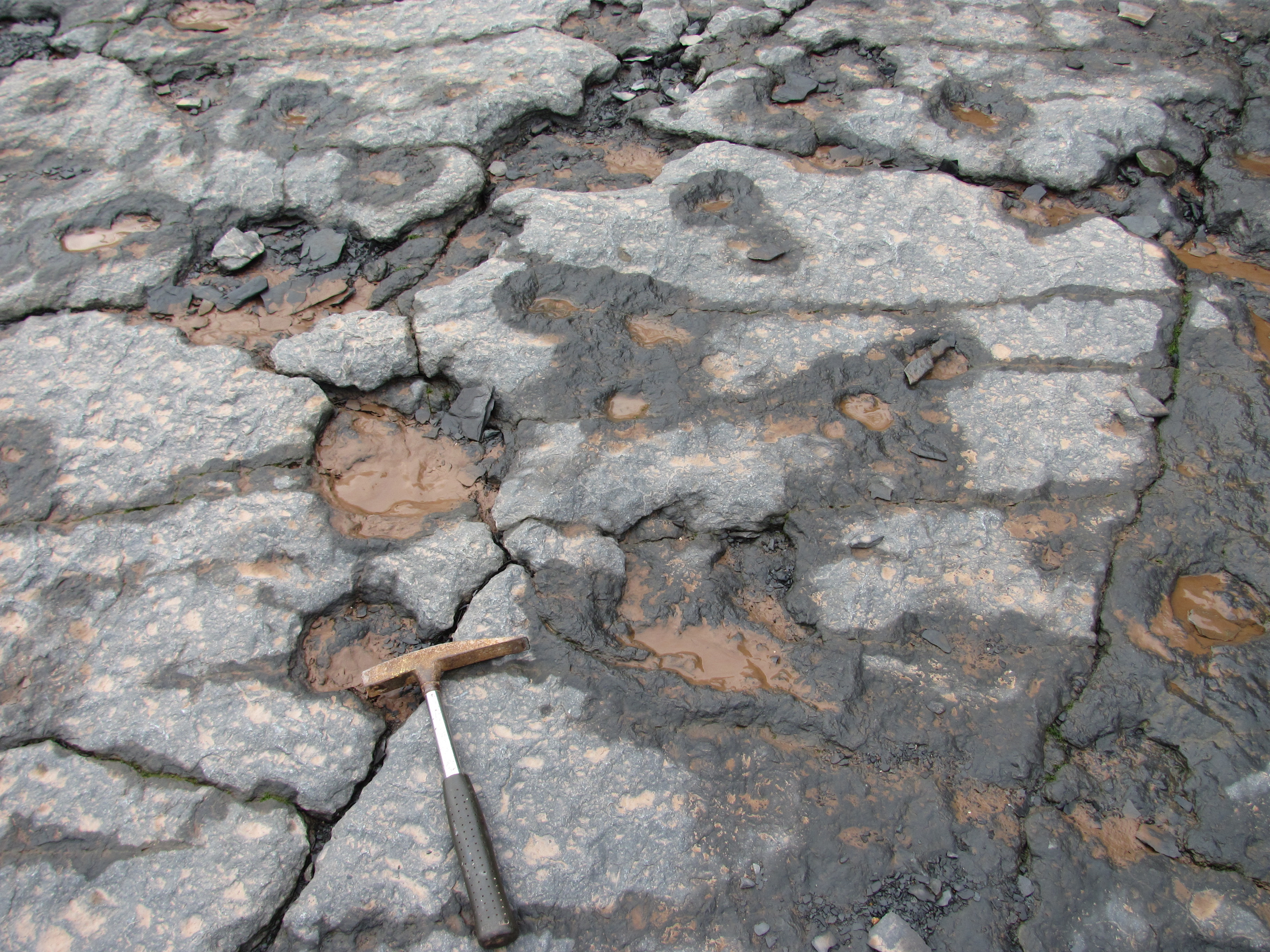
Photograph of exposed fossil tree bases at Blue Beach, Nova Scotia.

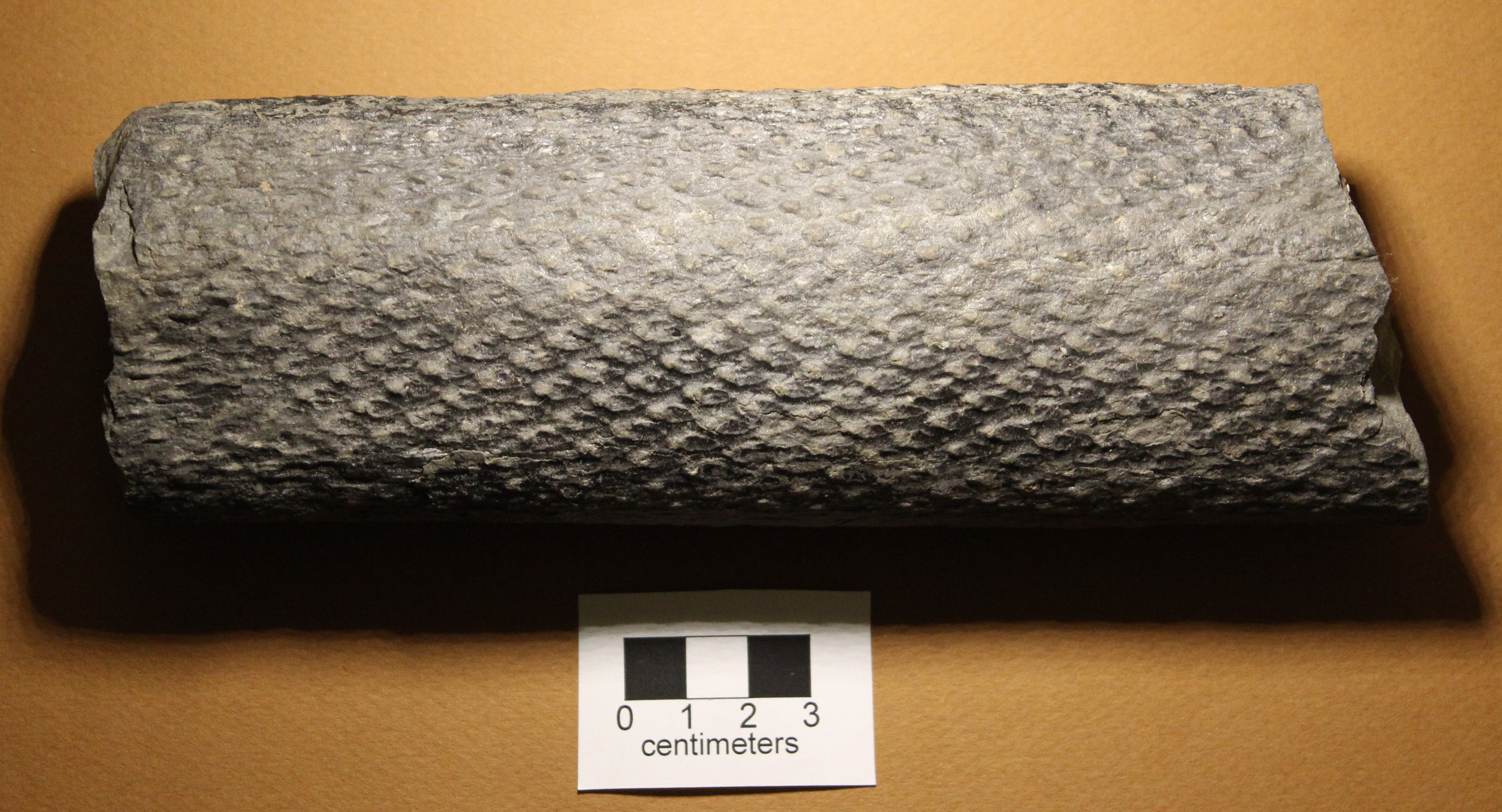
A well-preserved section of Lepidodendron from Blue Beach.

== Fauna ==
Fauna includes tetrapods, fish, arthropods (horseshoe crabs, trilobites and ostracods) and shells. Fish material is quite common, but articulated bones are very rare. Most common are scales, small ribs and teeth. Uncommon are larger bones including fin spines, jaws, cranial material, clavicles, limb bones and pelvic bones.

Arthropods include Paleolimulus woodae, an extinct horseshoe crab. Contrary to some erroneous reports in the popular press, it is not the world's oldest horseshoe crab (Order Xiphosurida), but is scientifically instead the oldest paleolimulid (Family Paleolimulidae). It is known from two examples found by visitors - including a Grade 4 student. The species name honors Sonja Wood who runs the Blue Beach Museum and has studied the fossils for many years along with her husband Chris Mansky. Trilobites are also rarely found. This is interesting because trilobites are marine, whereas the majority of the Blue Beach location is seen as a lacustrine deposit. The trilobites found thus far are restricted to a 20 centimetres (7.9 in) thick layer.

Fish fossils include Elonichthys, Rhadinichthys, Canobius, Letognathus, ?Ctenodus, Gyracanthides, Gyracanthus, Acanthodidae, and Bothriolepis. Letognathus was originally assigned to Rhizodus in the mid 1800s and later to Strepsodus. This includes the species Rhizodus (now Letognathus) hardingi of Dawson, named after a Dr. Harding of Windsor, Nova Scotia. Similarly, Dawson's Acrolepis is now attributed to Elonichthys and his Palaeoniscus is attributed to Canobis.

Tetrapod fossils include acanthostegids, ichthyostegids, tulerpetontids, whatcheeriids, and embolomeres.

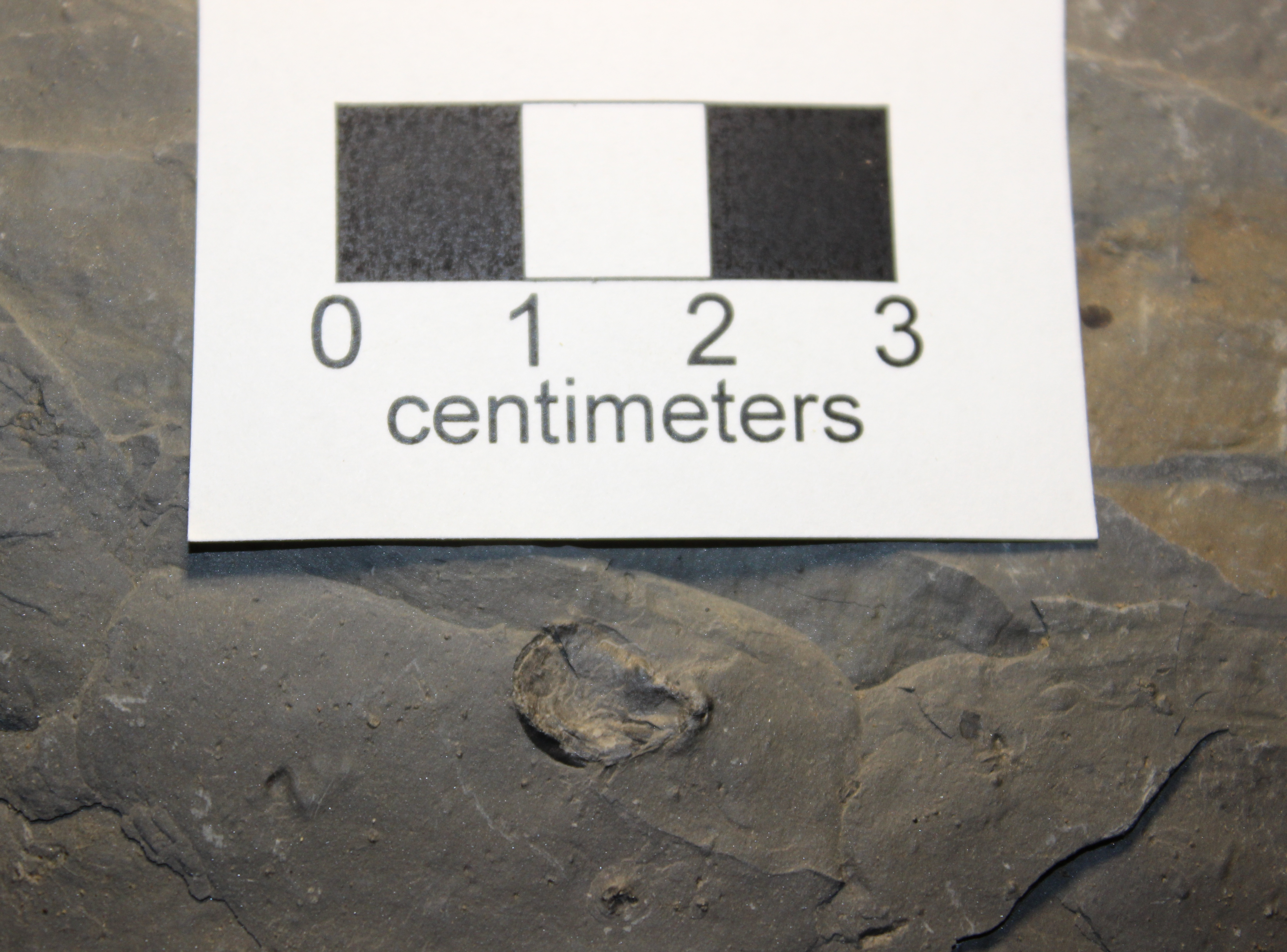
Shell

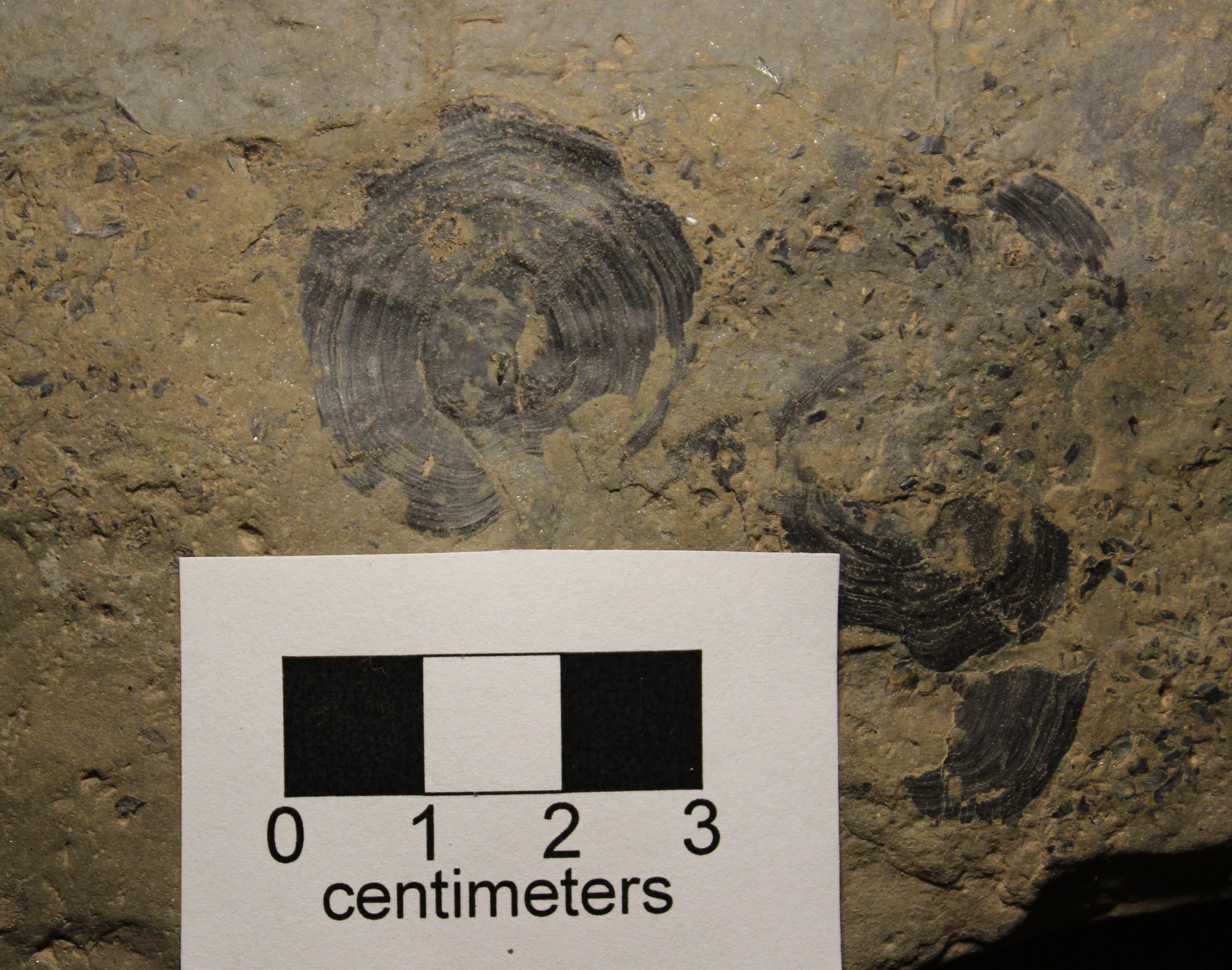
Fish scales

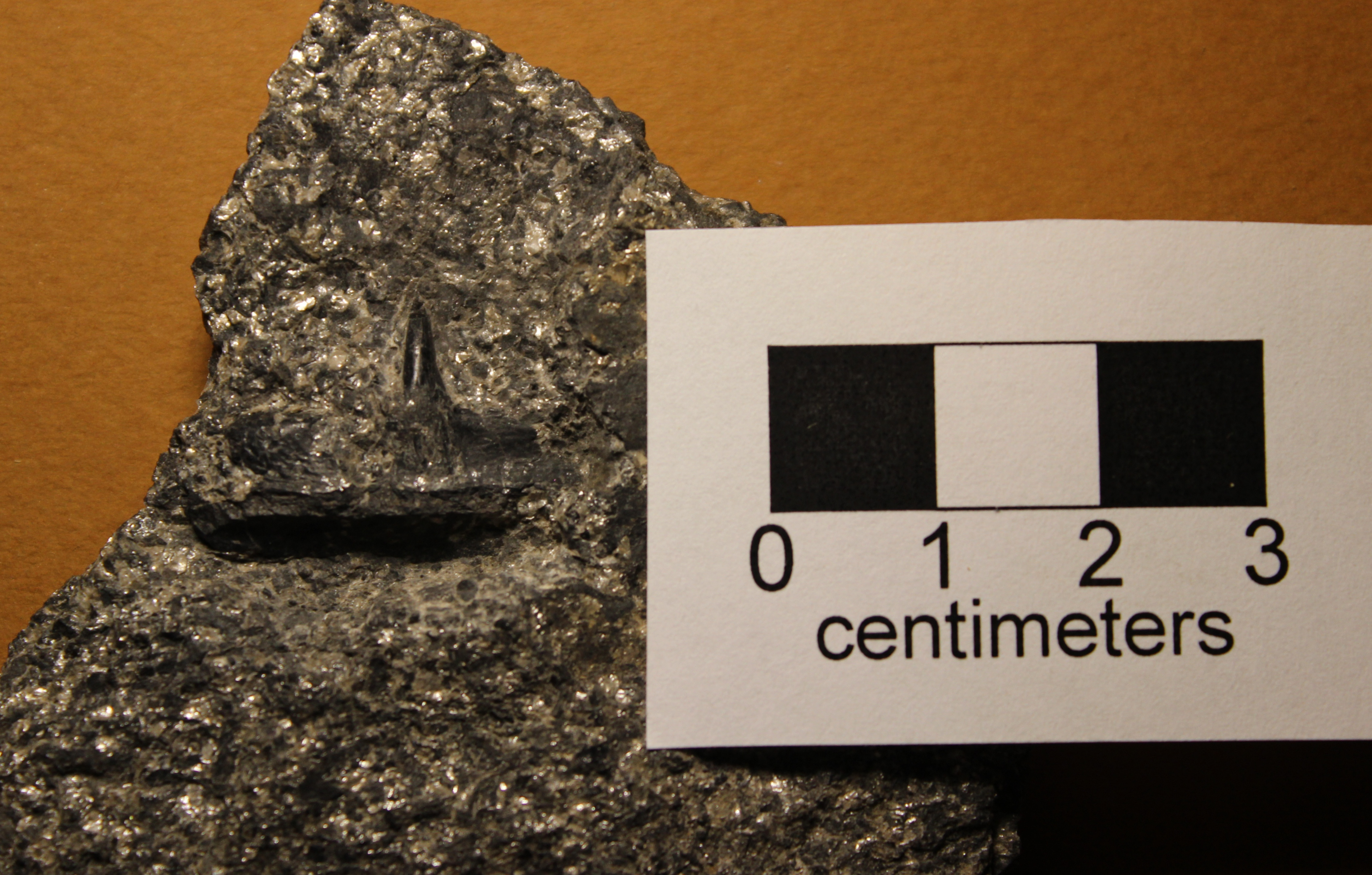
Fish jawbone with tooth

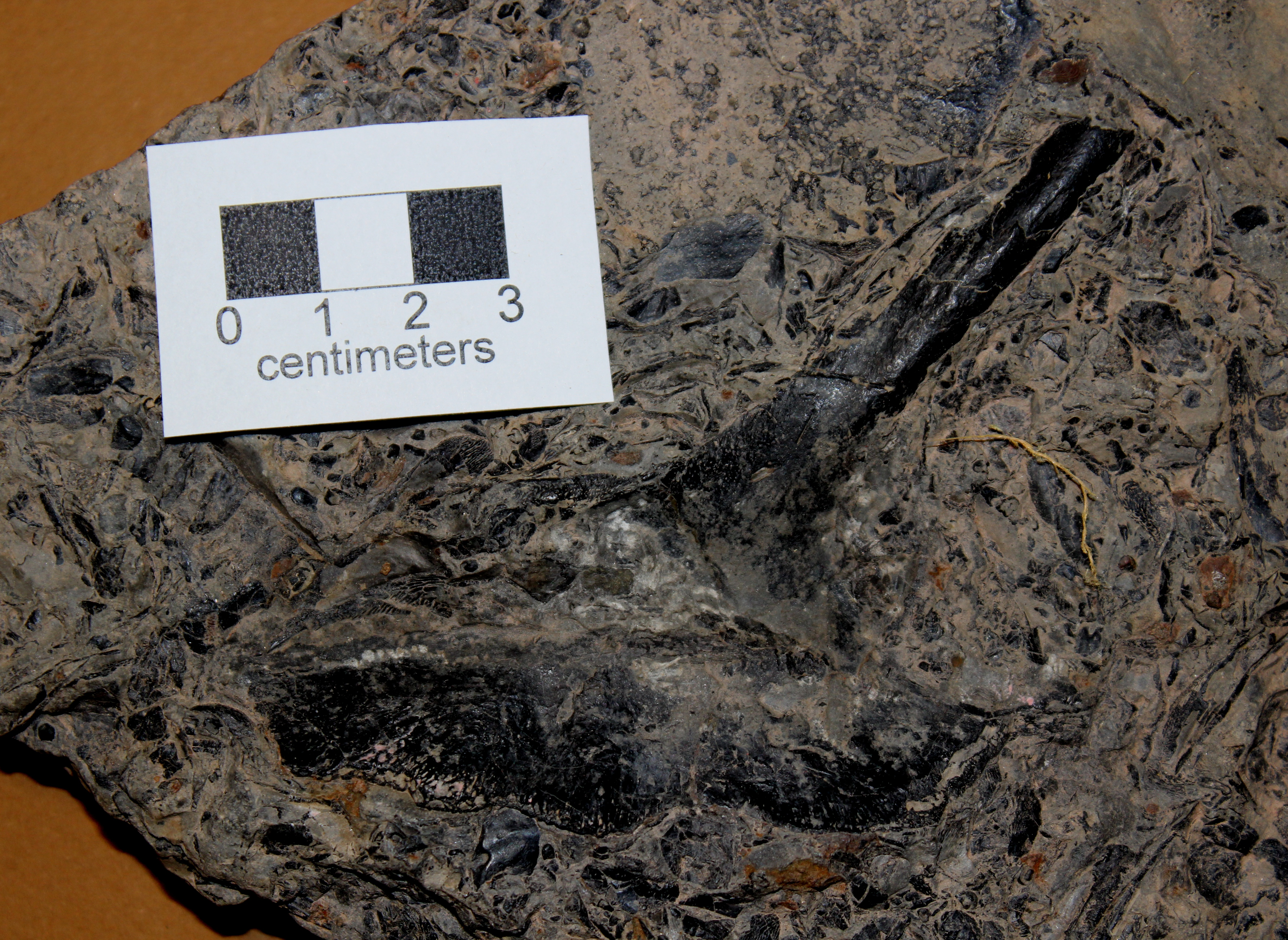
Clavicle

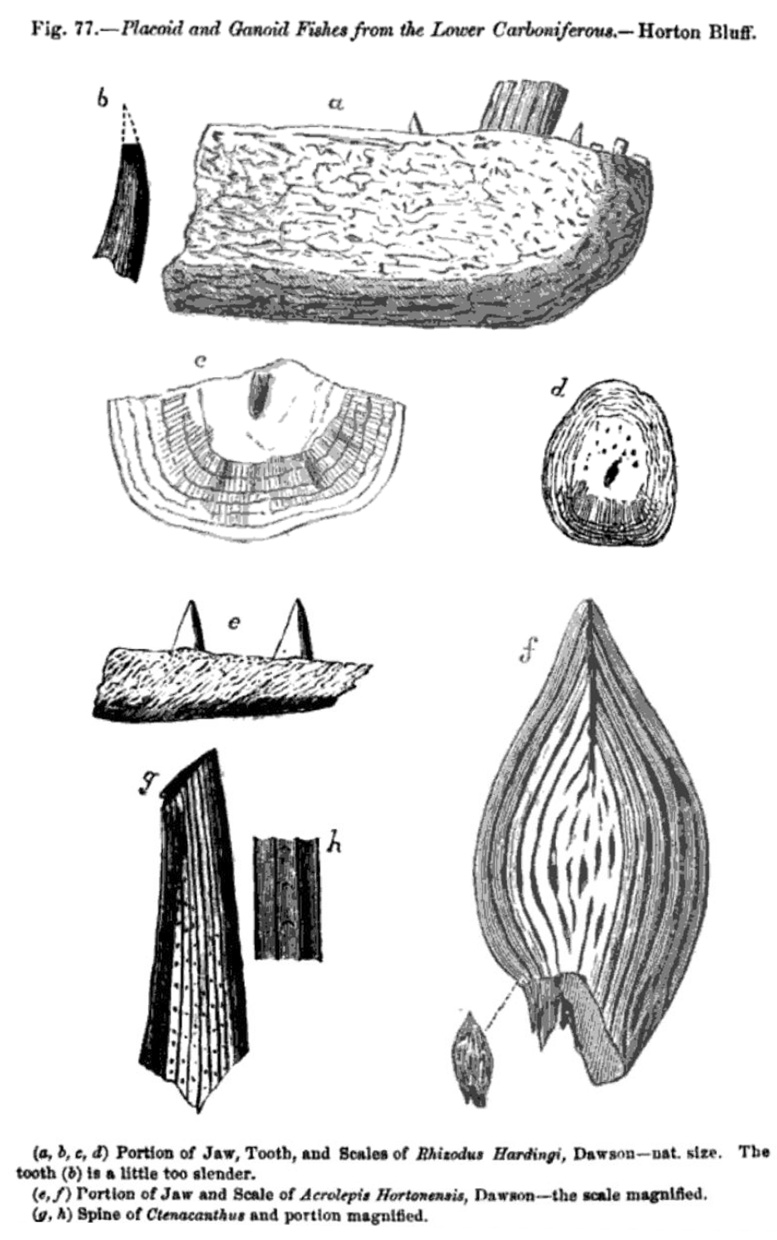
Figure of fish fossils from Dawson's Acadian Geology

== Trace fossils ==
Trace fossils are common. Examples include tetrapod footprints, fish fin trails, arthropod trackways, wave ripples, mud cracks, rain drops, and bromolites - including coprolites, fossilized dung.

The tetrapod footprints and trackways are particularly important due to their age. They are reasonably common at Blue Beach, with over 2000 specimens known. Prints of tetrapods from this era can exhibit polydactyly, or more than five digits per limb., however the specimens from Blue Beach are all pentadactyl (five digits) or are at least functionally pentadactyl. Six morphotypes have been identified so far.

Several types of arthropod trace fossils are found including trackways of Diplichnites and Diplopodichnus (possibly millipedes), Rusophycus (possibly trilobites), Paleohelcura (scorpions), and Arborichnus.

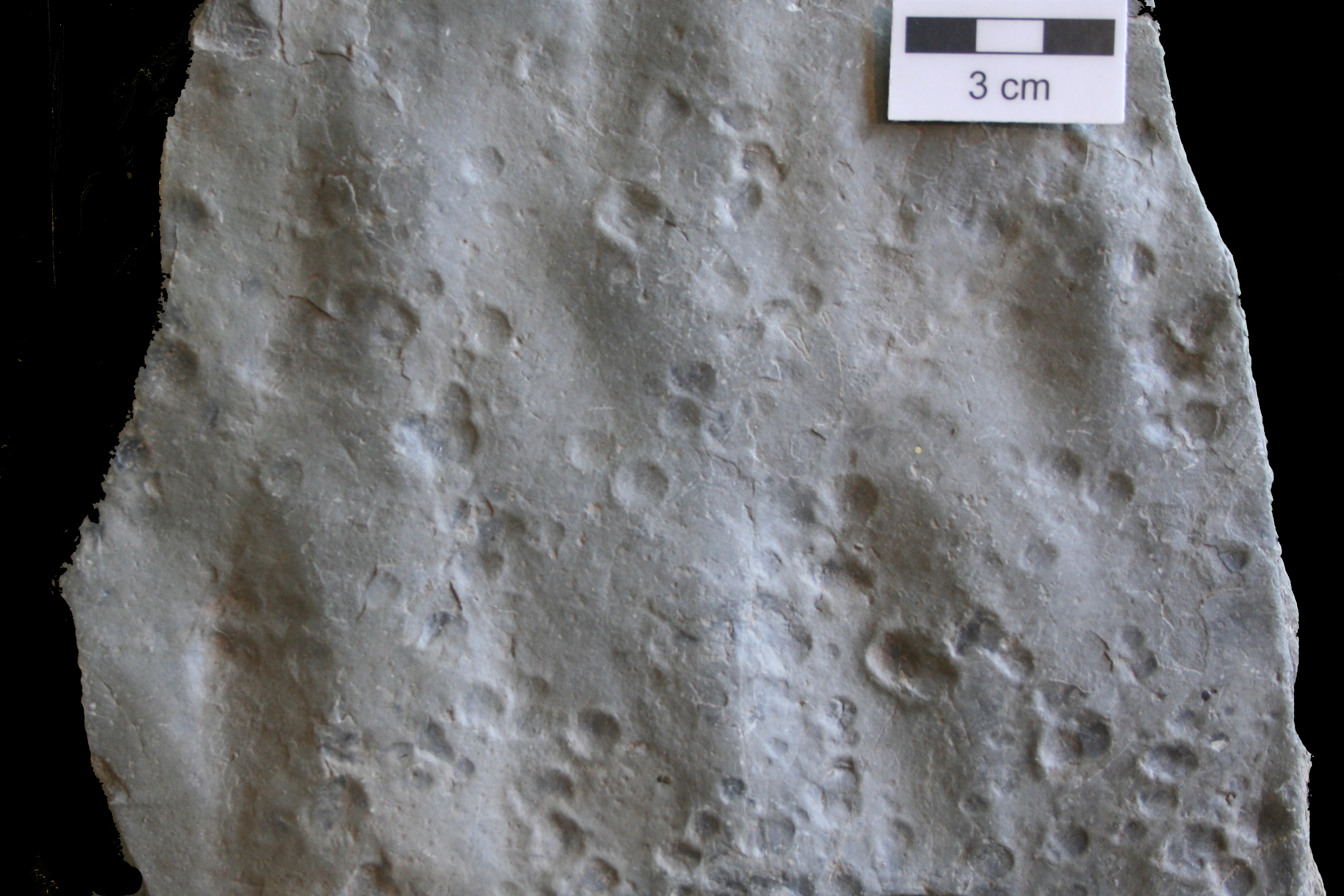
Photograph of trace raindrop impressions from Blue Beach.

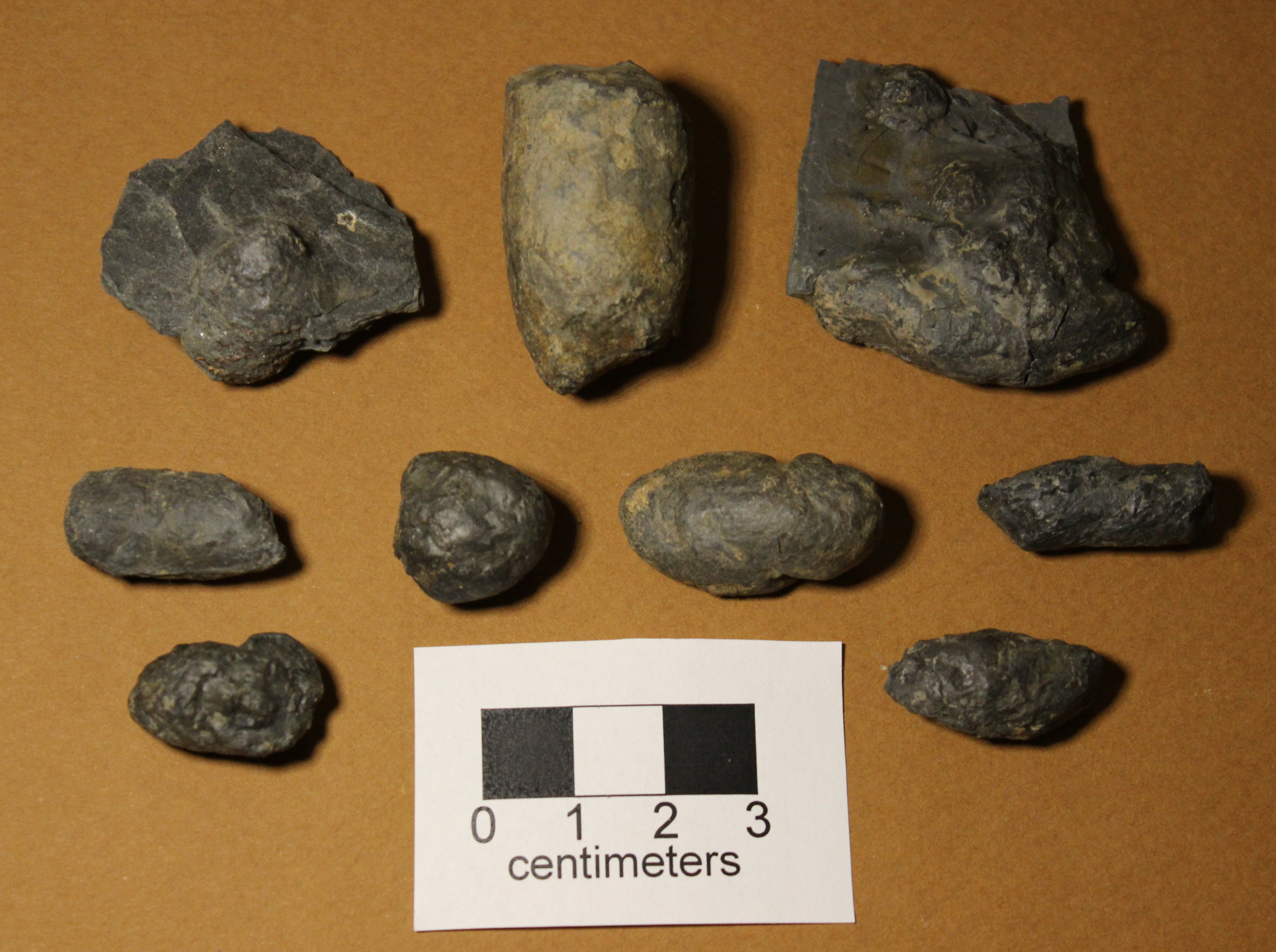
Fish coprolites from Blue Beach.

== Museum ==
From 2000 onward, a small museum formed in a barn near Blue Beach has displayed fossils from it, as founded by Chris Mansky and Sonja Wood. The museum plans to expand to a larger facility.
