= Snowy Plains Formation =

Rock formation in Victoria

- Stratigraphic range: Mississippian (Tournaisian), 358.8–354 Ma
- Type: Geological formation
- Unit of: Mansfield Group
- Overlies: Devonian rocks
- Thickness: Between 250 m (820 ft) to 500 m (1,600 ft) (Home Station Sandstone Member)

Lithology
- Primary: Siltstone, mudstone, sandstone

Location
- Location: Mansfield, Victoria
- Coordinates: 37°03′0″S 146°05′0″E
- Region: Victoria
- Country: Australia
- Snowy Plains Formation (Australia) Snowy Plains Formation (Victoria)

The Snowy Plains Formation is a fossiliferous formation of the Mansfield Group, which had yielded most of the historically described Carboniferous fish taxa in Australia, located near Mansfield, Victoria. Specifically, it is of early Tournaisian age, the oldest subdivision of the Mississippian epoch.

Although the Snowy Plains Formation is most notable for its body fossils of various fish, it has also been the discovery site of several ichnotaxa.

The formation comprises the following members, in descending order (youngest to oldest):

- Devil's Plain Siltstone
- Hearns Mudstone
- Lanky Creek Sandstone
- Buttercup Sandstone
- Home Station Sandstone
- Ashwin Siltstone
- Dungeon Gully Sandstone

== History ==
The age of the Mansfield fish fauna of the formation was once determined to be of Late Devonian age by George Sweet in 1889 and Frederick McCoy in 1890, on the basis that the lithology of the rock strata was similar to the Old Red Sandstone of the Late Devonian in Scotland, and that the fossil taxa were similar. However, it was later determined by Arthur S. Woodward in 1906 that the fauna were actually of Carboniferous age, due to similarities with other Carboniferous fish faunas of Europe and America, and concluded that McCoy's account was erroneous. In more recent decades, it appeared that Eupleurogmus creswelli could no longer be substantiated due to insufficient material, and Acanthodes australis could not be identified at the species level. However, later works continue to include E. creswelli and A. australis.

== Paleobiota ==
Color key: Taxon / Reclassified taxon / Taxon falsely reported as present / Dubious taxon or junior synonym / Ichnotaxon / Ootaxon / Morphotaxon

Notes
Uncertain or tentative taxa are in small text
~~crossed out~~ taxa are discredited.

=== Actinopterygii ===
Actinopterygians of the Snowy Plains Formation
Genus	Species	Clade	Image
Mansfieldiscus	M. sweeti (Formerly Elonichthys sweeti)	Palaeonisciformes, Palaeoniscoidea	
Mansfieldiscus	?M. sp.	Palaeonisciformes, Palaeoniscoidea	
Novogonatodus	N. gibbus (Formerly Elonichthys gibbus)	Palaeonisciformes, Palaeoniscoidea	
Novogonatodus	N. kasantsevae	Palaeonisciformes, Palaeoniscoidea	

=== Chondrichthyes ===
Chondrichthyans of the Snowy Plains Formation
Genus	Species	Clade	Image
Acanthodes	A. australis	Acanthodiformes, Acanthodidae	Restoration of Acanthodes lopatini.
Acanthodes	A. sp.	Acanthodiformes, Acanthodidae	Restoration of Acanthodes lopatini.
Ageleodus	A. altus	Elasmobranchii, incertae sedis	Tooth of Ageleodus pectinatus.
Ctenacanthus	C. sp.	Euselachii, Ctenacanthidae	Life restoration of Ctenacanthus sp.
Eupleurogmus	E. creswelli	Acanthodiformes, Acanthodidae	
Gyracanthides	G. murrayi	Climatiiformes, Gyracanthidae	Restoration of Gyracanthides murrayi.
?Tristychius	?T. sp.	Euselachii, Tristychiidae	
Acanthodii indet.	sp. indet.	Acanthodii, incertae sedis	
Hybodontoidea indet.	sp. indet.	Euselachii, Hybodontiformes incertae sedis	

=== Sarcopterygii ===
Sarcopterygians of the Snowy Plains Formation
Genus	Species	Clade	Image
Barameda	B. decipiens	Rhizodontida, Rhizodontidae	Reconstruction of B. decipiens.
Barameda	B. mitchelli	Rhizodontida, Rhizodontidae	Reconstruction of B. decipiens.
Delatitia	D. breviceps (Formerly Ctenodus breviceps)	Dipnoi, incertae sedis	

=== Ichnotaxa ===
Ichnotaxa of the Snowy Plains Formation
Genus	Species	Notes	Image
Cruziana	C. problematica	Varies in size and surficial morphology due to animal behaviour. Possibly a result of an arthropod ploughing into the sandy sediment to feef.	
Unnamed tetrapod tracks	Indet.	Clawed tracks made by tetrapods resembling those of Notalacerta, Dromopus and Varanopus. Initially claimed to represent those of amniotes (more specifically sauropsids) based on the presence of claws despite being much older than the oldest known amniote body fossils, but later research suggested that even stem-tetrapods such as Westlothiana also had claw-like terminal digits, suggesting that the tracks cannot attributed to amniotes in confidence	
Fuersichnus	F. commerfordi	Possibly made by insect larvae.	
Margaritichnus	M. mansfieldi	Likely to have been made by a bivalve.	
Palaeophycus	P. tubularis	Branching tubular burrows, possibly by an arthropod.	
Platicytes	P. lioparadus	Unbranched tubular burrows, possibly by an arthropod.	
Rusophycus	R. biloba	Likely to have been produced by a non-trilobite arthropod.	
Rusophycus	R. eutendorfensis	Likely to have been produced by a non-trilobite arthropod.	
Rusophycus	R. jenningsi	Likely to have been produced by a non-trilobite arthropod.	
Rusophycus	R. sp.	Likely to have been produced by a non-trilobite arthropod.	
Sagittichnus	S. lincki	Possibly made by an ostrocod.	
