= Strepheoschema =

Strepheoschema Temporal range: Tournaisian–Visean

Scientific classification
- Domain: Eukaryota
- Kingdom: Animalia
- Phylum: Chordata
- Class: Actinopterygii
- Family: †Strepheoschemidae
- Genus: †Strepheoschema; White, 1927

Type species
- †Strepheoschema fouldenensis White, 1927

Extinct genus of ray-finned fishes

Strepheoschema is an extinct genus of ray-finned fish that lived during the early Mississippian (Tournaisian–Visean) in what is now Berwickshire, Scotland, and Northumberland, England. Fossils were recovered from the Ballagan Formation (Cementstone Group).
