= Inverclyde Group =

Rock strata in Scotland and England

- Stratigraphic range: Courceyan to Chadian substages of Carboniferous
- Type: Group
- Sub-units: Kinnesswood Formation, Ballagan Formation, Clyde Sandstone, Tyminghame formations, Balcomie Beds
- Underlies: Strathclyde Group
- Overlies: Stratheden Group
- Thickness: Up to 1,500 m (4,900 ft)

Lithology
- Primary: Sandstone
- Other: Mudstone, limestone. siltstone, dolomite

Location
- Region: Midland Valley
- Country: Scotland, England

Type section
- Named for: Inverclyde

The Inverclyde Group is a Carboniferous lithostratigraphic group (a sequence of rock strata) in southern Scotland and northernmost England. The name is derived from Inverclyde. The rocks of the Inverclyde Group have also previously been referred to as the Cementstone Group and Stirling Group. The group comprises sandstones with limestones and dolomites and some mudstone and lesser amounts of siltstone.
