= Kinnesswood Formation =

Geological formation in Scotland

- Stratigraphic range: Famennian
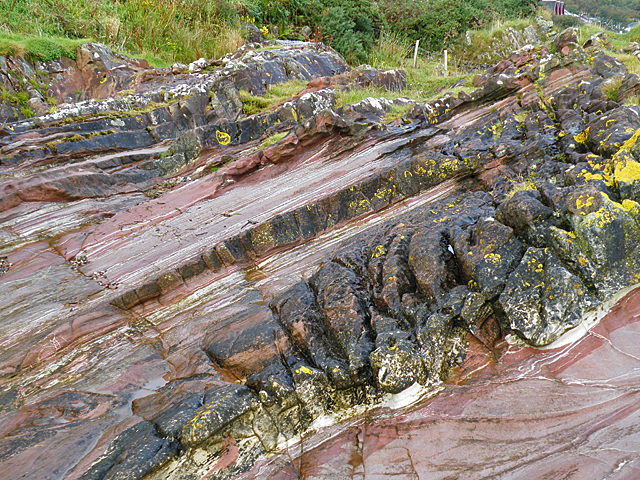
- Kinnesswood Formation exposed near the southern tip of the Isle of Bute
- Type: Geological formation
- Unit of: Inverclyde Group
- Underlies: Ballagan Formation
- Overlies: Knox Pulpit Formation
- Thickness: up to 400 metres (1,310 ft)

Lithology
- Primary: Sandstone
- Other: Limestone, Siltstone

Location
- Region: Europe
- Country: Scotland
- Extent: Central Lowlands

Type section
- Named for: Kinnesswood
- Location: Kinnesswood Row (partial)

The Kinnesswood Formation is a geological formation in the Central Lowlands of Scotland. The lithology largely consists of sandstone with interbeds of limestone and siltstone
