= Horton Bluff Formation =

Geologic formation in Nova Scotia, Canada

- Stratigraphic range: Carboniferous
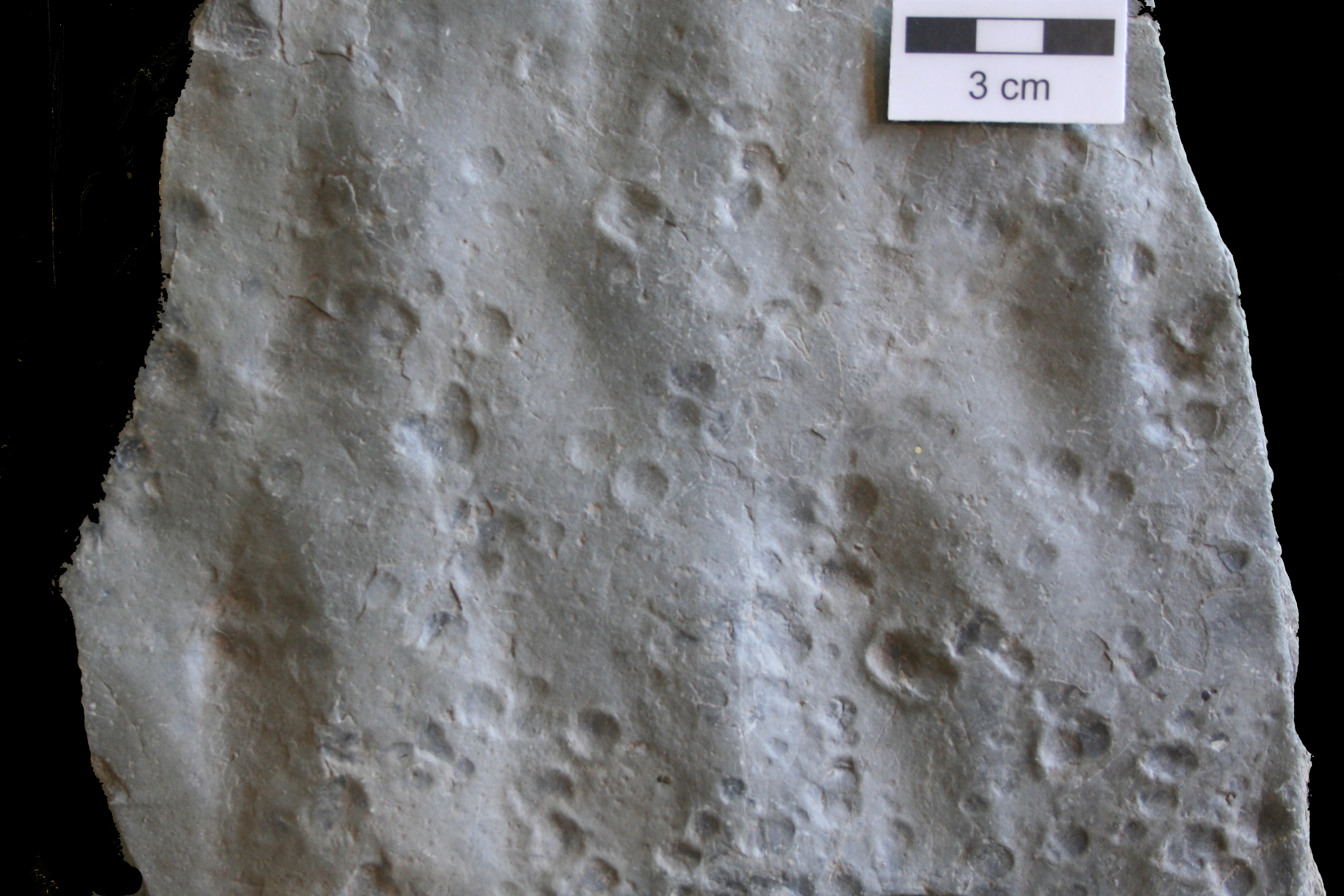
- Raindrop impressions preserved in Horton Bluff sandstone
- Type: Formation

Location
- Region: Nova Scotia
- Country: Canada

The Horton Bluff Formation is a geologic formation in Nova Scotia. It preserves fossils dating back to the Carboniferous period. It is located 2.5 kilometres southeast of Avonport Station.

== See also ==
- List of fossiliferous stratigraphic units in Nova Scotia
- Blue Beach
