= Avonport Station, Nova Scotia =

Locality in Nova Scotia, Canada

Coordinates: 45°6′34″N 64°14′54″W

Avonport Station is a locality in Kings County, Nova Scotia, Canada. It is located near Avonport. The Horton Bluff formation is located 2.5 kilometres southeast from the community.
