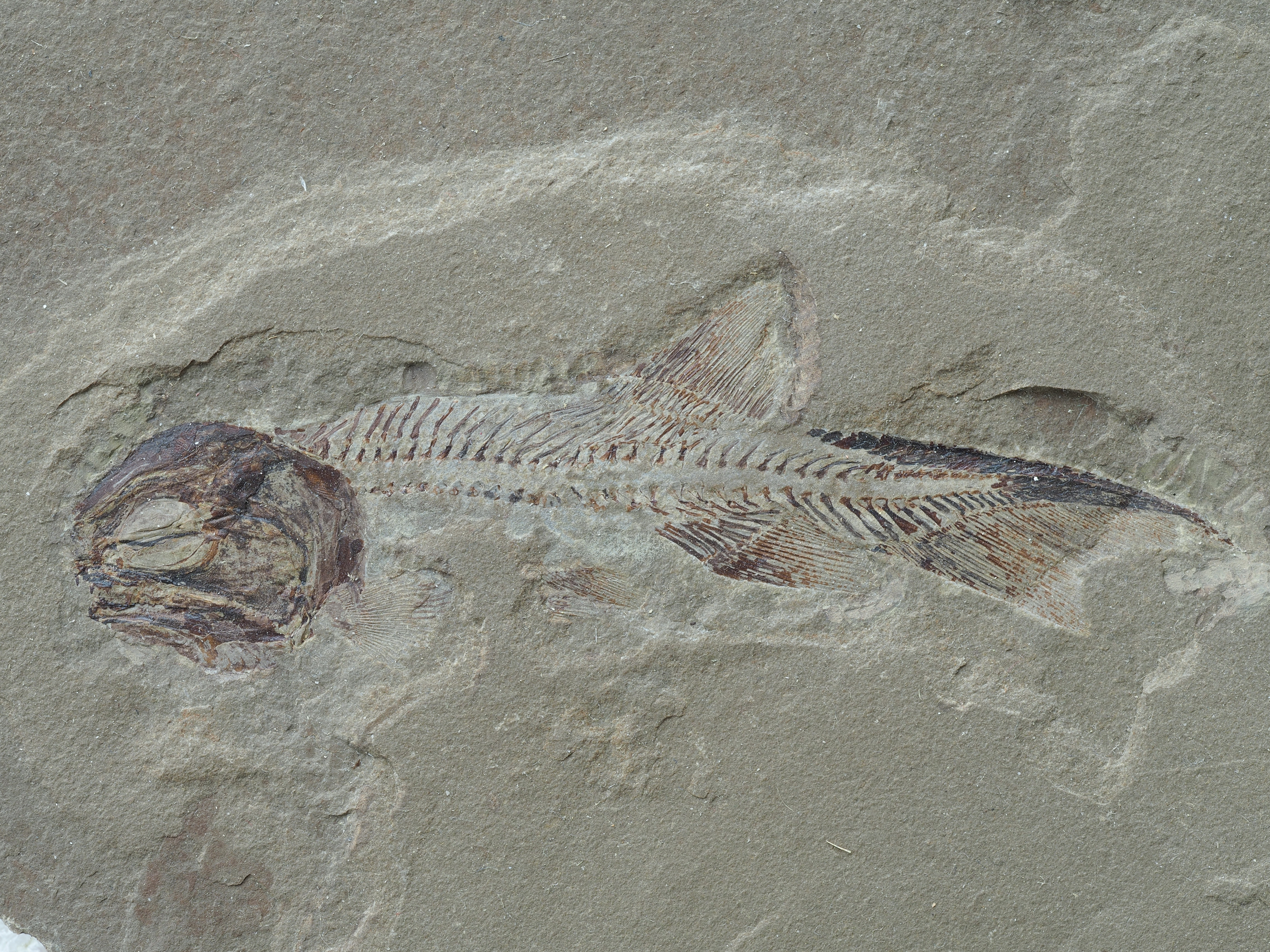
- Phanerosteon phonax fossil

Scientific classification
- Kingdom: Animalia
- Phylum: Chordata
- Class: Actinopterygii
- Order: †Palaeonisciformes
- Genus: †Phanerosteon; Traquair, 1881

Type species
- †Phanerosteon mirabile Traquair, 1881

Other species
- †P. phonax Lowney, 1980; †P. ovensi (White, 1927)

Synonyms
- †Carboveles White, 1927

= Phanerosteon =

Phanerosteon Temporal range: Serpukhovian-Gzhelian

Extinct genus of ray-finned fishes

Phanerosteon is an extinct genus of ray-finned fish from the Carboniferous period. The type species, P. mirabile, was recovered from the Calciferous sandstone series (Pennsylvanian), Scotland. A second species, P. phonax was described from the Serpukhovian aged Bear Gulch Limestone lagerstätte in Montana, United States.
