= Archichthys =

Archichthys Temporal range: Carboniferous

Scientific classification
- Kingdom: Animalia
- Phylum: Chordata
- Class: †Rhizodontida
- Order: †Rhizodontiformes
- Family: †Rhizodontidae
- Genus: †Archichthys; Hancock and Atthey, 1870

Type species
- †Archichthys portlockii Portlock, 1843

Synonyms
- Strepsodus sulcidens Hancock and Atthey, 1870; Archichthys sulcidens Hancock and Atthey, 1870

Genus of fishes

Archichthys is a genus of rhizodont lobe-finned fish that lived throughout the Carboniferous period. Fossils have been found in Northern Ireland and England.
