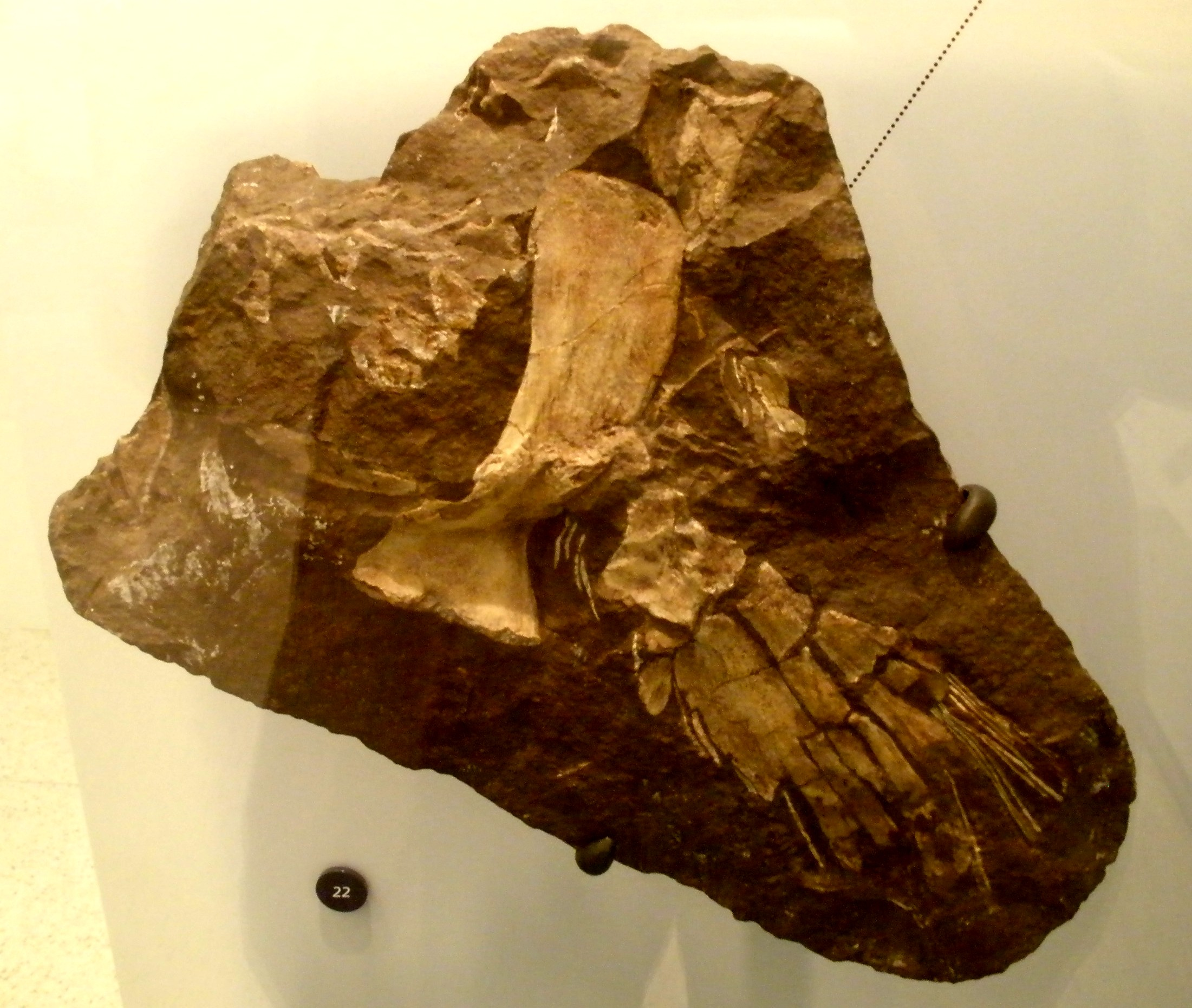

Scientific classification
- Kingdom: Animalia
- Phylum: Chordata
- Class: †Rhizodontida
- Order: †Rhizodontiformes
- Family: †Rhizodontidae
- Genus: †Sauripterus; Hall, 1843

Type species
- †Sauritolepis taylori Hall, 1840

= Sauripterus =

Sauripterus Temporal range: Devonian

Extinct genus of tetrapodomorphs

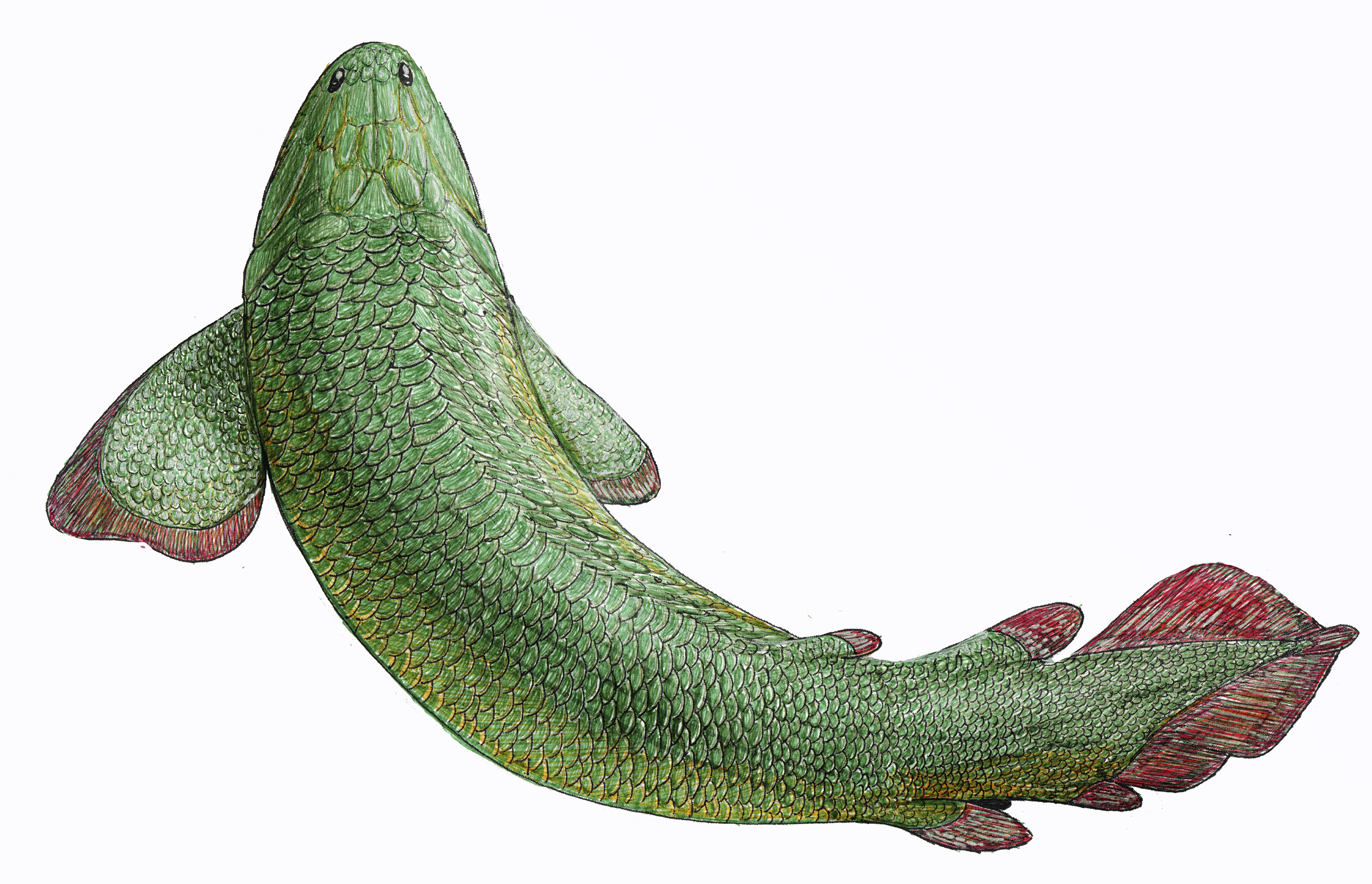
Life restoration

Sauripterus ("lizard wing") is a genus of rhizodont lobe-finned fish that lived during the Devonian period. This genus was described by J. Hall after its discovery at Powy's Curve in the Catskill Formation of Pennsylvania, US. Sauripterus utilized its radial joints and flexors to stiffen its fins, facilitating various swimming movements.
