= Screbinodus =

Screbinodus Temporal range: Carboniferous

Scientific classification
- Domain: Eukaryota
- Kingdom: Animalia
- Phylum: Chordata
- Clade: Sarcopterygii
- Clade: Tetrapodomorpha
- Class: †Rhizodontida
- Order: †Rhizodontiformes
- Family: †Rhizodontidae
- Genus: †Screbinodus; Andrews, 1985

Extinct genus of tetrapodomorphs

Screbinodus is a genus of rhizodonts lobe-finned fish that lived during the Carboniferous period.
