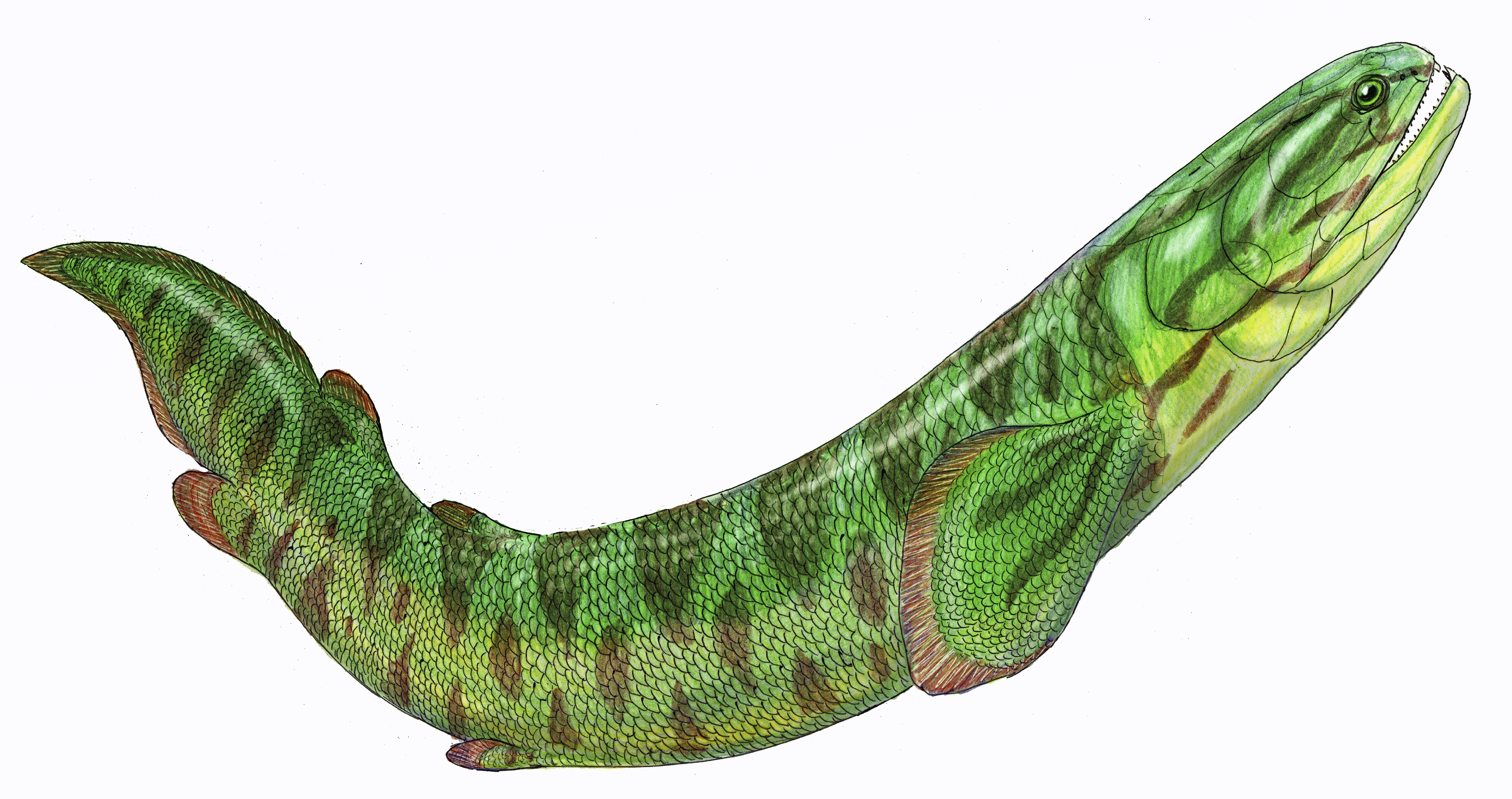
- Life restoration

Scientific classification
- Kingdom: Animalia
- Phylum: Chordata
- Class: †Rhizodontida
- Order: †Rhizodontiformes
- Family: †Rhizodontidae
- Genus: †Barameda; Long, 1989

Species
- †B. decipiens; †B. mitchelli

= Barameda =

Barameda Temporal range: Tournasian ~355 Ma

Extinct genus of tetrapodomorphs

Barameda (Indigenous Australian language: "fish trap") is a genus of rhizodont lobe-finned fishes which lived during the Tournaisian stage near the start of the Carboniferous period in Australia; fossils of the genus have been reported from the Snowy Plains Formation. The largest member of this genus, Barameda decipiens, reached an estimated length of around 3–4 metres (9.8–13.1 ft), while the smallest species, B. mitchelli is estimated to have had a length of about 35 centimetres (14 in).

== Description ==
Species of the genus Barameda had an extremely elongated and thick body typical of Carboniferous rhizodonts. It was covered with moderately thin, cycloidal scales, with thick bony plates covering its head and operculum (gill flaps), a tightly fused Skull roof, and extremely prominent, sharp fangs, devoid of serrations or cutting edges. Its scales preserved a lateral line. Originally it was estimated to have a typical narrow pectoral fin, however a later study shows that it had a wider pectoral fin like other Carboniferous rhizodonts.

== Paleoecology ==
Along with other rhizodonts, Barameda seems likely to have been a benthic ambush predator, and its pectoral fins support that interpretation.
