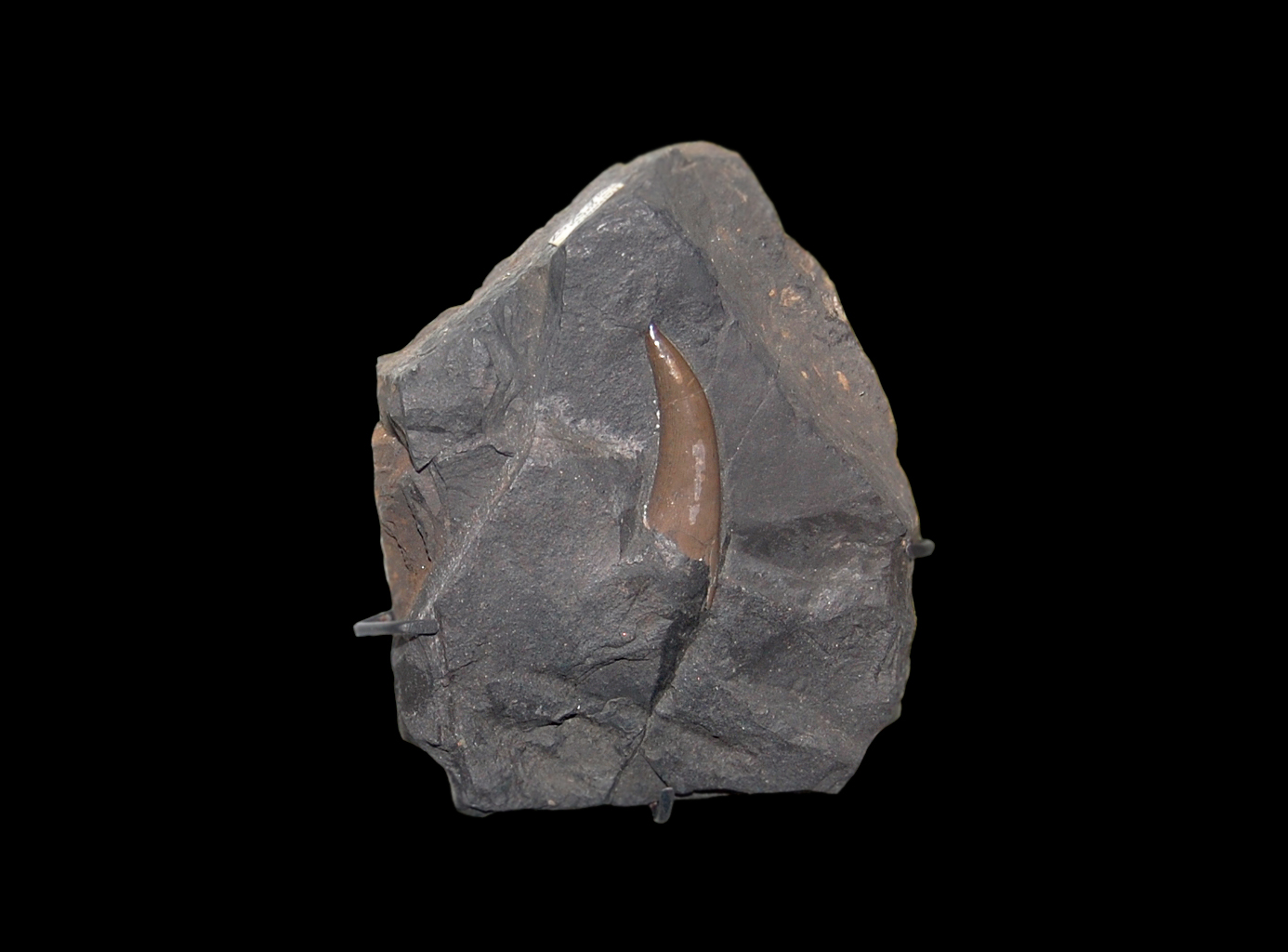
- Tooth

Scientific classification
- Kingdom: Animalia
- Phylum: Chordata
- Class: †Rhizodontida
- Order: †Rhizodontiformes
- Family: †Rhizodontidae
- Genus: †Strepsodus; Huxley, 1865

Type species
- †Strepsodus sauroides Binney, 1841

= Strepsodus =

Strepsodus Temporal range: Carboniferous

Extinct genus of fishes

Strepsodus is a genus of rhizodont lobe-finned fish that lived throughout the Carboniferous period. Fossils have been found in eastern Canada, Britain (England and Scotland), and Queensland, Australia; indeterminate species of Strepsodus have also been found in the late Devonian deposits of Turkey, Iran and Colombia. A large individual is measured up to 3.5 metres (11.5 ft) long.
