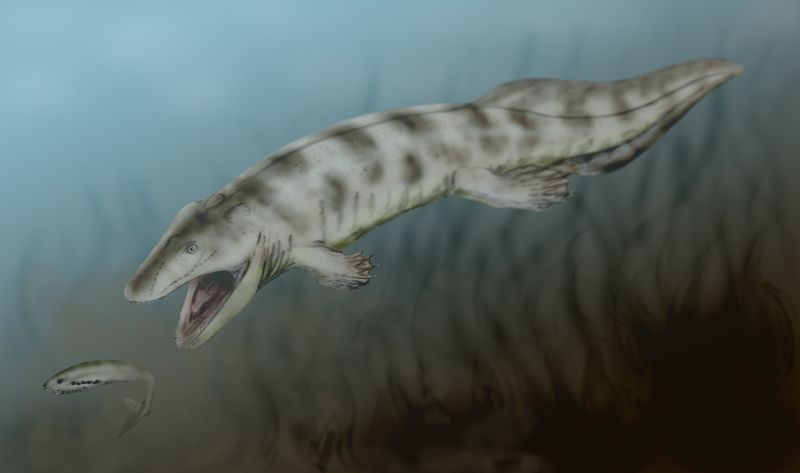
- An artist's depiction of Ventastega curonica chasing prey.

Scientific classification
- Kingdom: Animalia
- Phylum: Chordata
- Clade: Stegocephali
- Genus: †Ventastega; Ahlberg, P.E, Clack, J.A, Lukševičs, E., Zupiņš, I. 1994

Species
- †V. curonica

= Ventastega =

Ventastega Temporal range: 376.1–360.7 Ma Famennian (Late Devonian)

Extinct genus of tetrapodomorphs

Ventastega (Venta referring to the Venta River at the Ketleri Formation where Ventastega was discovered) is an extinct genus of stem tetrapod that lived during the Upper Fammenian of the Late Devonian, approximately 372.2 to 358.9 million years ago. Only one species is known that belongs in the genus, Ventastega curonica, which was described in 1996 after fossils were discovered in 1933 and mistakenly associated with a fish called Polyplocodus wenjukovi. ‘Curonica’ in the species name refers to Curonia, the Latin name for Kurzeme, a region in western Latvia. Ventastega curonica was discovered in two localities in Latvia, and was the first stem tetrapod described in Latvia along with being only the 4th Devonian tetrapodomorph known at the time of description. Based on the morphology of both cranial and post-cranial elements discovered (see below), Ventastega is more primitive than other Devonian tetrapodomorphs including Acanthostega and Ichthyostega, and helps further understanding of the fish-tetrapod transition.

== Discovery ==
Walter Gross was the first person to collect partial Ventastega remains, collecting some teeth in addition to scales from a locality called Ketleri in a Latvian Upper Famennian formation while on a collection trip in 1933. Gross attributed all remains to an osteolepiform fish named Polyplocodus wenjukov, before later in 1944 reattributing some of the fragments to a species called Panderichthys bystrowi when a piece of a lower jaw was collected from the same locality. Additional remains were collected from the locality and from another locality, Pavāri, in the same formation by researchers Per Erik Ahlberg, Ervīns Lukševičs, and Oleg Lebedev. After this collection they realized the previously collected remains were assigned incorrectly, and were actually part of a newly discovered tetrapod, which they named and described in a paper published in 1996. In the follow years, several more fragments of Ventastega curonica remains have been discovered at both the Ketleri and Pavāri localities, with all specimens residing at the Natural History Museum of Latvia.

== Description ==
=== Cranial elements ===
==== Lower jaw ====
The Ventastega holotype (LDM 81/521) is a right lower jaw ramus from Pavāri, and was described by Per Erik Ahlberg, Ervīns Lukševičs, and Oleg Lebedev. The lower jaw ramus total length was estimated to be over 200mm. This, combined with other cranial and post-cranial elements of Ventastega, made researchers predict that it was larger than Ichthyostega. The mandible is widest anterior to the first coronoid fang. The dentary is long and shallow, and has a butt joint as the contact with the coronoid series, indicating the dentary is loosely attached to the jaw. Similar to some tetrapods such as Acanthostega and Tulerpeton, the dentary's lateral surface is ornamented on the dorsal side with a smooth section only on the ventral margin. Another lower jaw specimen (LDM 81/552) is the only known complete Ventastega dentary, and shows Ventastega had 89 marginal teeth on each side of the jaw that are all approximately the same size, although they decrease in height as you move distally. Ventastega also has a pair of fangs on each dentary that are situated close to where the two dentaries meet at the most anterior part of the lower jaw, similar to Panderichthyes and Ichthyostega. On the precoronoid and intercornoid, Ventastega has fangs pairs set within the marginal row of teeth. On the lower jaw, Ventastega had a surangular pit line, which is present in most Sarcopterygians but unknown in any other tetrapods. A primitive characteristic on Ventastega, shared only with fish and Ichthyostega, is the presence of a fully enclosed mandibular sensory canal which opens to the external world through only a single row of pores.

==== Dermal skull bones ====
Maxillae, premaxillae, palatines, and a vomer along with large skull fragments from Pavāri have been identified as Ventastega. The maxilla is long and low, and unlike some fish, the posterior third of the maxilla is the lowest part of the bone. The teeth on the maxilla are approximately equal in size to each other, except for teeth in the posterior part where they shrink in size. The presence of a coronoid fangs in Ventastega is a primitive feature lost in Ichthyostega, Acanthostega, and likely Tulerpeton, indicating that Ventastega was more basal on a phylogeny in comparison other tetrapods. The posterolateral margin of the choana has a smooth area, which is evidence of a loose and ligamentous contact between the maxilla and premaxilla. The premaxilla itself is morphologically similar to premaxillas in Acanthostega, Ichthyostega, and Tulerpeton. The region of maximum curvature along the premaxilla is approximately halfway along the bone, suggesting that Ventastega had a broad and spade-shaped snout. Seventeen teeth are in each premaxilla, with the teeth increasing in size moving from the tip of the snout to the region of maximum curvature. A partial Ventastega cheekplate consisting of the jugal, and parts of the lacrimal, quadratojugal, squamosal, and preopercular is convex in the vertical plane, indicating that Ventastega's skull was low in height. The preopercular in this specimen and several other partial skull fragments is a primitive tetrapod character, otherwise seen only in Ichthyostega, Acanthostega, and Crassigyrinus. The cephalic lateral lines in Ventastega have an intermediate morphology with the lines only being partially enclosed, between the primitive state of full enclosure of the lines in fish and Ichthyostega, and the fully open lines seen in Temnospondyls and other derived tetrapods. The ventral surface of the Ventastega pterygoid is covered is covered in denticles, a feature shared by all early tetrapods except Ichthyostega. Ventastega has a large spiracular notch, larger than seen in any known Devonian tetrapods. The increase in spiracular notch size in Devonian tetrapods has been hypothesized to indicate an increased reliance on air breathing.

==== Braincase ====
A pristinely preserved three-dimensional braincase of Ventastega has been discovered, and closely resembles the braincase of Acanthostega, except Ventastega had a uniquely large and bi-lobed nerve foramen on the anterior face of the prootic, along with an orbit-temporal region immediately dorsal to the basipterygoid processes. Shared features between the two taxa were the shape of the prootic region and its location to the ventral cranial fissure and fenestra vestibuli, along with the basipterygoid processes and laterally open post-temporal fossae.

=== Post-cranial elements ===
The clavicle has a broad ventral blade with a narrow stem, characteristic of early tetrapods, along with the stem having a thick anterior and thin posterior lamina that merges into the lateral rod surface. In the iliac blade, there is a pronounced bend/kink approximately one third from the proximal end of the blade, with the distal part of the blade bent dorsally and mesially. The interclavicle is approximately 25% smaller than the clavicle, and similar in shape in a Greererpeton interclavicle, suggesting it had a similar rhomboidal or kite shape. The clavicle itself is similar to the morphology of other early tetrapod clavicles, with a tapering clavicular stem and P-shaped cross section, although it has a unique and distinct unornamented strip along the anterior margin.

== Classification ==
Ventastega curonica belongs to Tetrapoda in accordance with the traditional definition. According to a strict parsimony phylogeny that ranked 319 characters of tetrapods (defined less inclusively as a crown group) and other tetrapodomorphs, Ventastega is part of the stem-tetrapod group, with 96% bootstrapping consensus at its node (shown below). The group of stem-tetrapods contains any extinct taxon that, according to morphological analysis, is more closely related to lissamphibians (living amphibians) and amniotes than to any other crown group.

- Tetrapodomorpha
  - Eusthenopteron
  - - Panderichthys
    - - Ventastega
      - - Acanthostega
        - - Ichthyostega
          - - Tulerpeton
            - - - Colosteus
                - Greererpeton
              - - Crassigyrinus
                - - Whatcheeria
                  - - - Baphetes
                      - Megalocephalus
                    - Crown Group Tetrapoda

Ventastega in an evolutionary tree, as recovered from an analysis by Clack et al. 2016:

- Elpistostegalia
  - Panderichthys
  - Stegocephalia sensu Laurin, 1998
    - Metaxygnathus
    - - Tiktaalik
      - Stegocephali sensu Laurin, 2020
        - Acanthostega
        - - Ossinodus
          - - Ventastega
            - - Ichthyostega
              - - Ossirarus
                - - - Ymeria
                    - - Aytonerpeton
                      - Perittodus
                  - - Whatcheeriidae
                      - Whatcheeria
                      - Pederpes
                      - Occidens
                    - - Diploradus
                      - - Doragnathus
                        - - Sigournea
                          - - - Koilops
                              - - Tulerpeton
                                - Colosteidae
                                  - Greererpeton
                                  - Colosteus
                            - - Crassigyrinus
                              - - Baphetidae
                                  - Loxomma
                                  - - Megalocephalus
                                    - Baphetes
                                - Tetrapoda

== Role in fish–tetrapod transition ==
Ventastega has helped further research on the Fish-Tetrapod transition, the event during the Devonian when digit bearing tetrapods evolved from finned, fish ancestors. Research on rates of character changes in tetrapods have shown that there were high rates of character changes in the Devonian, which led to the conflicting hypotheses of either the tetrapods had few major changes that occurred during the Devonian or had many small but rapid morphology changes. The braincase of Ventastega has a mixture of fish-like and tetrapod-like characteristics, indicating that changes in the braincase during the fish-tetrapod transition occurred through a series of many small changes instead of one large change. The skull morphology of Ventastega has helped informed the hypothesis that changes in skull roof pattern proportions also occurred gradually, with the snout elongating and eyes increasing in size while moving dorsally over time.

Due to anoxic conditions in aquatic ecosystems during the Famennian (see Paleoenvironment below), early tetrapods such as Ventastega would have had a significant fitness advantage with the ability to exploit terrestrial environments.

=== Locomotion ===
No limb remains from Ventastega have been discovered to inform researchers about its locomotion, but paleontologists have been able to infer some basic information about its limbs and locomotion due to its overall morphological similarity to Acanthostega, a limbed tetrapod with digits. While no fossilized trackways from Ventastega have yet been discovered, discoveries of late Devonian trackways from closely related Ichthyostega and Acanthostega along with other early tetrapods indicate that the most stable gait for early tetrapods, including Ventastega, would a lateral-sequence walk. The trackway patterns, including marks from the tetrapods dragging their tails and bellies on the ground, have both been subaerial and subaqueous, indicating that the origin of terrestrial locomotion originated in tetrapods, not in their fish ancestors. Ventastega likely had subaqueous locomotion, which can be inferred from its close relation to Acanthostega, which researchers hypothesized moved subaqueously.

== Paleoenvironment ==
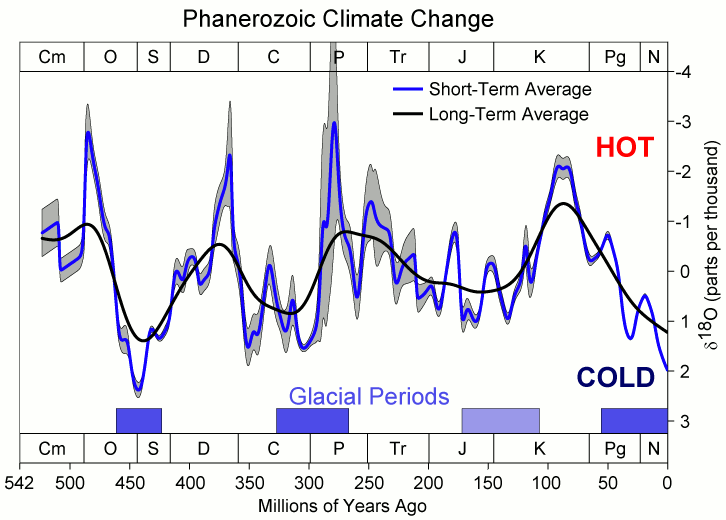
Graph showing the change in global oxygen concentration through time. Looking at the long term average, the graph shows oxygen concentrations in the atmosphere being lower in the Late Devonian in comparison to today.

Paleogeologists estimate that in the Famennian, the global average temperature was about 19.5 °C. CO_{2} levels in the atmosphere during the Famennian were approximately 0.3%, higher than present, while O_{2} levels were lower than present, making up only 16% of the atmosphere. Plants were undergoing rapid diversification during the middle and late Devonian, and beginning to occupy vast tracts of land instead of being restricted to the coastal margins, which created new terrestrial habitats, including the first forests. The decomposition of these newly diversified plants would have increased nutrient concentrations in the surrounding water, creating intense algae growth, which would cause eutrophic and anoxic conditions in the water. Ventastega and other early tetrapods would have been able to gulp air, giving them a significant fitness advantage by allowing them to explore the banks of the anoxic rivers and lakes where they were found.

Stem and crown tetrapods have been found in both freshwater environments along with estuarine and lagoonal environments of varying salinity. However, the sedimentology of the Ketleri Formation, including sands interbedded with siltstones and clays, indicates that Ventastega was deposited in a low-tidal, near-shore environment in saline water.

== Geographic and stratigraphic range ==
The Ketleri Formation or Ketleri Outcrop (Latvian: Ketleru atsegumi) is located in southwestern Latvia and northwestern Lithuania. Per Erik Ahlberg, Ervīns Lukševičs, and Oleg Lebedev collected Ventastega material both from the Ketleri locality where the original material was found, but also from another locality in the Ketleri formation, the Pavāri locality (Latvian: Pavāru atsegumi. The Ketleri locality is at the Venta river near the former Ketleri hamlet, while the Pavāri locality is across the Ciecere river from the former Pavāri hamlet. The formation itself is composed of sand, sandstone, clay, and dolomitic marls, with the formation being 45m thick in Lithuania and 41-56m thick in Latvia. The formation is composed of three members, the lowermost Nīgrange member which has thick clayey carbonate deposits, the Pavāri member which consists of sand and sandstone with high levels of quartz, feldspar, and mica, and the upper Varkaļi member which is composed of fine feldspar-quartz sands and sandstones with high quantities of mica. The Pavāri member had a shallow erosional channel filled with well sorted sands indicating the presence of a stream in the Devonian that flowed in the channel from NNE to SSW, which is the characteristic direction of flow across the whole Ketleri formation. Sand particles filled in the erosional channel, and then were followed by slow, calm intertidal streams depositing poorly sorted silts and clays.

== See also ==
- Acanthostega
- Ichthyostega
- Devonian period
- Latvia
- Sarcopterygians
- Tetrapodamorpha
- Tetrapods
