= Jenny Clack =

English paleontologist and biologist (1947–2020)

Jenny Clack FRS FLS
- Born: Jennifer Alice Agnew; 3 November 1947
- Died: 26 March 2020 (aged 72)
- Education: Newcastle University (BSc, PhD); University of Leicester; University of Cambridge (MA)
- Known for: Gaining Ground: the Origin and Early Evolution of Tetrapods (2002)
- Scientific career
- Fields: Zoology; Palaeontology; Evolutionary biology
- Workplaces: Cambridge University Museum of Zoology; University of Cambridge; Darwin College, Cambridge

Jennifer Alice Clack, FRS, FLS (née Agnew; 3 November 1947 – 26 March 2020) was an English palaeontologist and evolutionary biologist. She specialised in the early evolution of tetrapods, specifically studying the "fish to tetrapod" transition: the origin, evolutionary development and radiation of early tetrapods and their relatives among the lobe-finned fishes. She is best known for her book Gaining Ground: the Origin and Early Evolution of Tetrapods, published in 2002 (second edition, 2012) and written with the layperson in mind.

Clack was curator at the Museum of Zoology and Professor of Vertebrate Palaeontology at the University of Cambridge, where she devoted her career to studying the early development of tetrapods, the "four-legged" animals said to have evolved from Devonian lobe-finned fishes and colonised the freshwater swamps of the Carboniferous period.

== Early life and education ==
Clack was born on 3 November 1947, the only child of Ernest and Alice Agnew. She was brought up in Manchester, England. She was educated at Bolton School (Girls' Division), a private school in Bolton, Lancashire. She received a B.Sc. in Zoology from the University of Newcastle upon Tyne in 1970. In 1978, she accepted an invitation from Alec Panchen to obtain a Ph.D. from the same university, at the encouragement of her then new boyfriend Rob Clack. They married in 1980. Her doctorate was completed in 1984. She also held a Graduate Certificate in Museum Studies from the University of Leicester and an MA from the University of Cambridge. On 9 December 2000, she was awarded a Doctor of Science (ScD) degree by the University of Cambridge.

== Academic career ==
In 1981, Clack joined the University Museum of Zoology, University of Cambridge, as an Assistant Curator. She was promoted to Senior Assistant Curator in 1995. Since 2005, she has been Curator in Vertebrate Palaeontology at the museum. In 2006, she was awarded a personal chair by the University of Cambridge, and took the title Professor of Vertebrate Palaeontology. She retired in 2015 and became Emeritus Professor of Vertebrate Palaeontology at the museum. In 1997, Clack was elected a Fellow of Darwin College, Cambridge; since 1 October 2015, she has been an Emeritus Fellow. From 2000 to 2005, she was Reader in Vertebrate Palaeontology at the University of Cambridge. On 1 October 2006, Clack was awarded a personal chair by Cambridge, taking the title Professor of Vertebrate Palaeontology.

Clack is best known for her extensive body of work on early tetrapods, much of which redefined how paleontologists conceived of the evolution of limbs and other features associated with tetrapods' transition from other lobe-finned fishes. She began her career working primarily on the ear of early tetrapods and later expanded to more broadly addressing the osteology and evolution of tetrapods. Together with Michael Coates (University of Chicago), Clack defined what is known as "Romer's Gap", a major gap in the fossil record of early tetrapods and one that she subsequently began to fill in collaboration with other paleontologists. Clack also undertook extensive fieldwork expeditions in order to search for further remains of early tetrapods. In 1987, during an expedition to East Greenland, Clack and her team discovered the remains of the Devonian tetrapods Acanthostega and Ichthyostega, following up on field notes of researchers who had collected material of Acanthostega in 1970. Additional surveys in 1998 led to the collection of substantial new material, including what is now recognized as Ymeria. Most recently, she led a major consortium project (TW:eed) investigating some exciting new fossils from Northumberland and the Borders Region of Scotland which date from the Tournaisian stage of the earliest Carboniferous period; this project has produced numerous publications furthering the understanding of early tetrapod evolution.

Over the course of her lengthy career, Clack published in some of the most notable scientific journals, including Nature, Science, and Proceedings of the National Academy of Sciences and is one of the most published vertebrate paleontologists in Nature, arguably the leading scientific journal in the world, with over 15 papers in that journal alone. In addition to her Gaining Ground book, Clack also co-authored a volume of the Handbuch der Paläoherpetologie series on early tetrapods with Andrew Milner in 2015 and co-edited a volume on the evolution of hearing in 2016.

Clack is probably best known for discovering that the earliest tetrapods had more than five toes per foot: the Upper Devonian tetrapods from East Greenland, Ichthyostega had seven while Acanthostega had eight (compared to the six toes of the Russian Devonian tetrapod Tulerpeton). This suggests that pentadactyly was not an ancestral trait for tetrapods.

Clack supervised many graduate students who went on to pursue successful careers in paleontology and evolutionary biology, including Per Ahlberg (Uppsala University), Paul Upchurch (University College London), Michael Lee (Flinders University), and Matthew Friedman (University of Michigan). In April 2012 she was featured in an episode of the BBC television series Beautiful Minds, a set of documentaries about scientists who have made important discoveries. This may be viewed on YouTube. Clack was honored by her peers with a festschrift published in 2019.

Taxa named by Jennifer Clack and colleagues
Year	Taxon	Authors
2020	Rossichthys clackae gen. et sp. nov	Johanson et al.
2020	Brittagnathus minutus gen. et sp. nov.	Ahlberg & Clack
2019	Parmastega aelidae gen. et sp. nov.	Beznosov, Clack, Lukševičs, Ruta & Ahlberg
2019	Limanichthys fraseri gen. et sp. nov.	Challands et al.
2018	Celsiodon ahlbergi gen. et sp. nov.	Clack, Challands, Smithon & Smithson
2018	Mesanerpeton woodi gen. et sp. nov.	Smithson & Clack
2018	Whitropus longicalcus gen. et sp. nov.	Richards et al.
2018	Deltodus tubineus sp. nov.	Richards et al.
2017	Spathicephalus marsdeni sp. nov.	Smithson et al.
2016	Perittodus apsconditus gen. et sp. nov.	Clack & Smithson
2016	Koilops herma gen. et sp. nov.	Clack & Smithson
2016	Ossirarus kierani gen. et sp. nov.	Clack & Smithson
2016	Diploradus austiumensis gen. et sp. nov.	Clack & Smithson
2016	Aytonerpeton microps gen. et sp. nov.	Clack & Smithson
2015	Ctenodus williei sp. nov.	Smithson, Richards & Clack
2015	Ctenodus whitropei sp. nov.	Smithson, Richards & Clack
2015	Ctenodus roberti sp. nov.	Smithson, Richards & Clack
2015	Xylognathus macrustenus gen. et sp. nov.	Smithson, Richards & Clack
2015	Ballagadus rossi gen. et sp. nov.	Smithson, Richards & Clack
2015	Ballagadus caustrimi sp. nov.	Smithson, Richards & Clack
2015	Coccovedus celatus gen. et sp. nov.	Smithson, Richards & Clack
2015	Occludus romeri gen. nov.	Smithson, Richards & Clack
2012	Ymeria denticulata gen. et sp. nov.	Clack, Ahlberg, Blöm & Finney
2011	Kirktonecta milnerae gen. et sp. nov.	Clack
2004	Occidens portlocki gen. et sp. nov.	Clack & Ahlberg
2003	Kyrinion martilli gen. et sp. nov.	Clack
2002	Pederpes finneyae gen. et sp. nov.	Clack
1998	Eucritta melanolimnetes gen. et sp. nov.	Clack
1993	Silvanerpeton miripedes gen. et sp. nov.	Clack

== Death ==
Clack died on 26 March 2020 at the age of 72, after a five-year battle with endometrial cancer.

== Honours ==
In 2008, Clack was awarded the Daniel Giraud Elliot Medal from the U.S. National Academy of Sciences, the first woman to achieve the honor.

In 2009, Clack was elected a Fellow of the Royal Society, the first female vertebrate paleontologist to achieve the honor. She has also been elected a Foreign Honorary Member of the American Academy of Arts and Sciences.

On 15 June 2013, Clack was awarded an honorary Doctor of Science (DSc) degree by the University of Chicago. The university described her as "an internationally preeminent palaeontologist whose research has profoundly changed the understanding of the origin of terrestrial vertebrate life." Also in 2013, she was awarded the T Neville George Medal by the Geological Society of Glasgow.

On 17 July 2014, she was awarded an honorary Doctor of Science degree by the University of Leicester. Also in 2014, she was made an Honorary Foreign Member of the Royal Swedish Academy of Sciences.

In 2018, she won the Palaeontological Association's most prestigious award, the Lapworth Medal.
