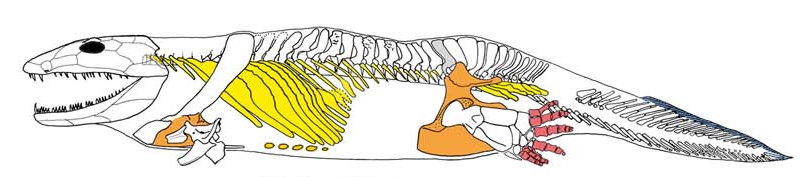
- Skeleton of the early stegocephalian Ichthyostega

Scientific classification
- Kingdom: Animalia
- Phylum: Chordata
- Clade: Elpistostegalia
- Clade: Stegocephali; Cope, 1868

Subgroups
- See text

= Stegocephali =

Clade of tetrapodomorphs

Stegocephali or Stegocephalia (from Ancient Greek: στεγοκεφαλια, lit. "roofed head") is a taxon of limbed vertebrates. In its traditional sense, Stegocephalia groups together various early limbed vertebrates, including temnospondyls and stem-tetrapods such as Ichthyostega. As Stegocephalia in the traditional sense is paraphyletic, in 1998 the Canadian paleontologist Michel Laurin proposed redefining the taxon as a clade, encompassing all limbed vertebrates, including both traditional stegocephalians and their living descendants. This proposed use of Stegocephalia replaced the traditional use of Tetrapoda, which nine years earlier had been proposed to be redefined to restrict it to the crown group. However, the traditional use of Tetrapoda for the clade of limbed vertebrates has since remained in common use.

== History of classification ==
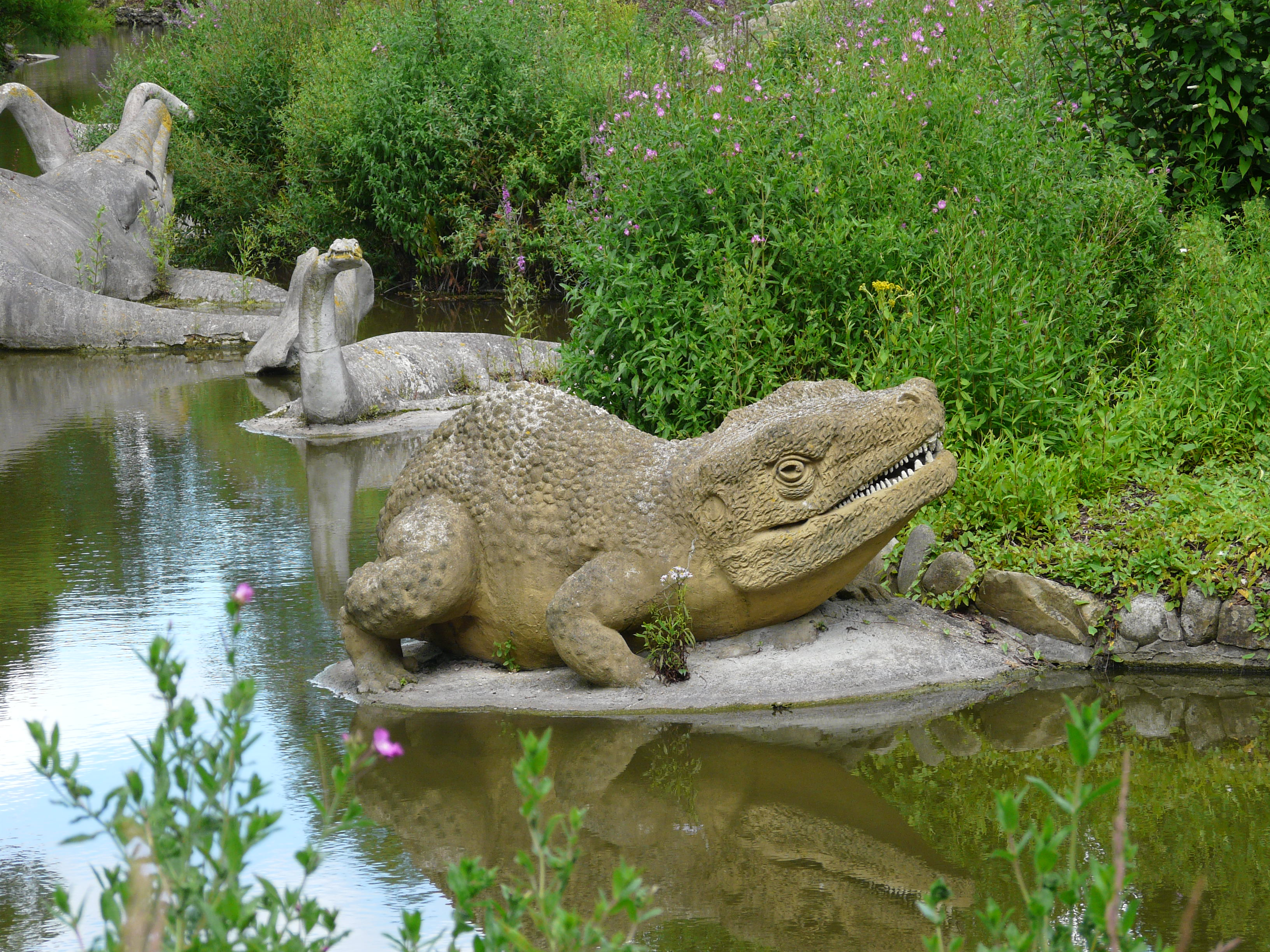
Typical 19th-century depiction of a primitive stegocephalian, based on modern anurans and fossils now recognised as belonging to mastodonsaurids and Bromsgroveia

Stegocephali was coined by Edward Drinker Cope in 1868 as an order of Batrachia. He divided the order into four suborders, Microsauria, Ganocephala, Labyrinthodontia, and Xenorhachia (a taxon coined by Cope to include Amphibamus). Though Cope did not explain the etymology of the name, it presumably refers to the solid skull roof, lacking fenestrae, shared by members of the group. Originally, the term was used as a systematic unit at the rank of order. The term rose to prominence in American and British science in the 19th century, though the largely equivalent term Labyrinthodontia had been coined 18 years earlier by Hermann Burmeister in reference to the tooth structure. The terms were used interchangeably during the early 20th century, usually divided into three orders. Cope originally spelled the term as "Stegocephali", though A.S. Woodward introduced the spelling "Stegocephalia" in 1898; this spelling subsequently became the more widespread spelling. Woodward considered Stegocephalia as one of four orders of Batrachia/Amphibia, alongside Gymnophiona, Caudata (salamanders, and Ecaudata (frogs), and divided Stegocephalia into four suborders, Branchiosauria, Aistopoda, Microsauria, and Labyrinthodontia. In the 20th century, the taxon Stegocephalia was widely used to group together all pre-Jurassic taxa traditionally considered "amphibians." Zittel, in 1902, provided a "typical" early 20th century classification of early tetrapods that divided Stegocephalia into Phyllospondyli (Branchiosauridae), Lepospondyli, Temnospondyli, and Stereospondyli. In contrast, Watson, instead of classifying all early tetrapods in the order Stegocephali, recognized two orders of early amphibian, Labyrinthodontia and Phyllospondyli. Abel, in 1919, considered Stegocephalia a subclass and divided it into the orders Rhachitomi, Embolomeri, and Phyllospondyli. When the stem-tetrapod Ichthyostega was first described in 1932, it was classified as a stegocephalian.

In general, Stegocephalia encompassed all limbed vertebrates except lissamphibians and amniotes. This traditional use of Stegocephalia refers to a paraphyletic group, and therefore is not considered a valid taxon under phylogenetic nomenclature.

=== Proposed redefinition as a clade ===
In 1989, Gauthier and colleagues proposed to redefine the taxon Tetrapoda to restrict it to the crown group clade uniting amniotes and modern amphibians. This left the clade of limbed vertebrates, Tetrapoda in the traditional sense, without a name, and meant that several taxa traditionally regarded as tetrapods, such as Ichthyostega and Crassigyrinus, were reclassified as a non-tetrapod sarcopterygians. In 1998, Michel Laurin proposed to redefine Stegocephali as a clade, in order to "rescue" it from invalidity and provide a name for the limbed vertebrate clade, by defining it as all vertebrates more closely related to Temnospondyli than to Panderichthys (the closest relative of tetrapods known to have retained paired fins, see below). Therefore, Stegocephali sensu Laurin 1998 includes all vertebrate groups that have toes rather than fins, and a few (Elginerpeton, Metaxygnathus, Ventastega and possibly Hynerpeton) that may have retained paired fins. Contrary to the old usage of this term, the Stegocephali refers to a clade in this scheme.. In 2021, as part of Phylonyms, Stegocephalia was again redefined as the group as including all taxa closer to Eryops than to Tiktaalik, Panderichthys, or Eusthenopteron. However, various subsequent studies have continued to use the traditional, apomorphy-based definition of Tetrapoda as the clade of limbed vertebrates rather than using Stegocephali for this clade.

== Phylogeny ==
Below is an evolutionary tree of stegocephalians, as recovered from an analysis by Swartz in 2012.

- Elpistostegalia
  - Panderichthys
  - Stegocephalia sensu Laurin, 1998
    - - Tiktaalik
      - Elpistostege
    - Stegocephali sensu Laurin, 2020
      - Elginerpeton
      - - Ventastega
        - - Acanthostega
          - - Ichthyostega
            - - Whatcheeriidae
              - - Colosteidae
                - - Crassigyrinus
                  - - Baphetidae
                    - Crown group Tetrapoda

As recovered by Clack et al. 2016:

- Elpistostegalia
  - Panderichthys
  - Stegocephalia sensu Laurin, 1998
    - Metaxygnathus
    - - Tiktaalik
      - Stegocephali sensu Laurin, 2020
        - Acanthostega
        - - Ossinodus
          - - Ventastega
            - - Ichthyostega
              - - Ossirarus
                - - - Ymeria
                    - - Aytonerpeton
                      - Perittodus
                  - - Whatcheeriidae
                      - Whatcheeria
                      - Pederpes
                      - Occidens
                    - - Diploradus
                      - - Doragnathus
                        - - Sigournea
                          - - - Koilops
                              - - Tulerpeton
                                - Colosteidae
                                  - Greererpeton
                                  - Colosteus
                            - - Crassigyrinus
                              - - Baphetidae
                                  - Loxomma
                                  - - Megalocephalus
                                    - Baphetes
                                - Tetrapoda

- Tetrapoda
  - Temnospondyli
  - - Eucritta
    - - Embolomeri
      - - Gephyrostegidae
        - - Silvanerpeton
          - - - Casineria
              - Seymouriamorpha
            - - Lepospondyli
              - Amniota

Cladogram after Pardo, 2024:

- Tetrapodomorpha
  - †Eusthenopteron
  - †Panderichthys
  - - †Tiktaalik
    - limbs present
      - †Ymeria
      - †Ventastega
      - †Ichthyostega
      - - †Acanthostega
        - - †Aistopoda
          - †Whatcheeria
          - †Pederpes
          - - †Crassigyrinus
            - - †Greererpeton
              - - †Embolomeri
                - - - †Eucritta
                    - †Baphetes
                  - crown group Tetrapoda
                    - Temnospondyli (including Lissamphibia)
                    - - †Seymouriamorpha (Seymouria)
                      - - †Diadectomorpha (Limnoscelis)
                        - Amniota (including modern mammals, reptiles and birds)

The following cladogram represents the results of Igielman (2026):

- Tetrapodomorpha
  - †Eusthenopteron
  - - †Tiktaalik
    - - †Ichthyostega
      - - †Acanthostega
        - - †Whatcheeriidae
          - - †Embolomeri
            - †Colosteidae
            - - †Westlothiana
              - †Aistopoda
            - - †Baphetoidea
              - crown-group Tetrapoda
                - Temnospondyli (including Lissamphibia, i.e. modern amphibians)
                - - †Seymouriamorpha
                  - - †Recumbirostra
                    - - †Diadectomorpha
                      - - †Captorhinidae
                        - Amniota (including modern mammals, reptiles and birds)

== Subgroups ==
- †Elginerpetontidae
- †Aistopoda
- †Whatcheeriidae
- †Colosteidae
- †Baphetoidea
- †Embolomeri
- crown-Tetrapoda
  - Batrachomorpha (stem-Lissamphibia, likely equivalent to Temnospondyli)
  - Reptiliomorpha (stem-Amniota, a.k.a. Anthracosauria sensu lato)
- Stegocephali incertae sedis
  - †Acanthostega
  - †Antlerpeton
  - †Aytonerpeton
  - †Brittagnathus
  - †Crassigyrinus
  - †Diploradus
  - †Densignathus
  - †Doragnathus
  - †Elpistostege?
  - †Gaiasia
  - †Hynerpeton
  - †Ichthyerpeton
  - †Ichthyostega
  - †Jakubsonia
  - †Koilops
  - †Livoniana?
  - †Mesanerpeton
  - †Metaxygnathus
  - †Occidens
  - †Ossirarus
  - †Parmastega
  - †Perittodus
  - †Sigournea
  - †Sinostega
  - †Tantallognathus
  - †Tanyka
  - †Tiktaalik?
  - †Tulerpeton
  - †Tutusius
  - †Umzantsia
  - †Ventastega
  - †Ymeria
