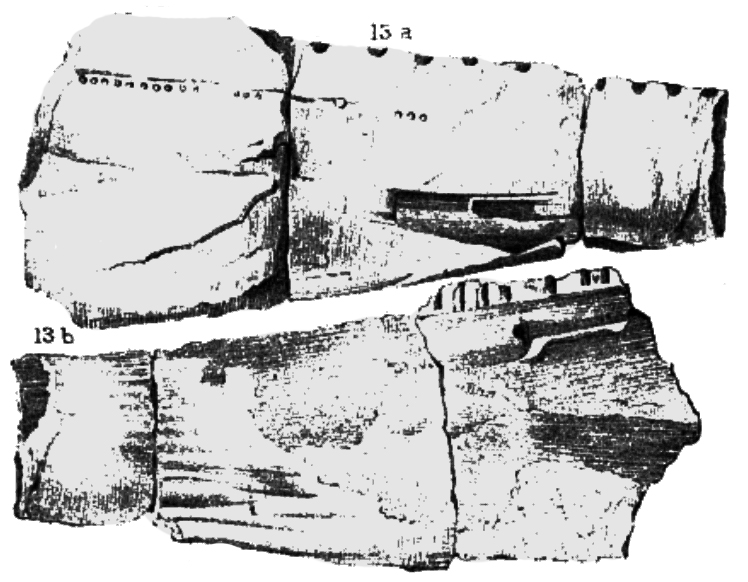
- Portlock's 1843 illustration of the jaw of Occidens portlocki, which he attributed to Holoptychius; inner surface (top) and outer surface (bottom)

Scientific classification
- Kingdom: Animalia
- Phylum: Chordata
- Clade: Stegocephali
- Genus: †Occidens; Clack and Ahlberg, 2004
- Species: †O. portlocki

Binomial name
- †Occidens portlocki Clack and Ahlberg, 2004

= Occidens portlocki =

Occidens portlocki Temporal range: Early Carboniferous, 350 Ma Tournaisian

Extinct species of tetrapodomorph

Occidens is an extinct genus of stem tetrapod from the Early Carboniferous (Tournaisian) Altagoan Formation of Northern Ireland. It is known from a single type species, Occidens portlocki, named in 2004 on the basis of a left lower jaw described by British geologist Joseph Ellison Portlock in 1843.

== History ==
The holotype, a left lower jaw, was discovered in Northern Ireland in 1843 by Joseph Ellison Portlock, who attributed the specimen to the lobe-finned fish Holoptychius. It was housed in the collections of the British Geological Survey for over a century before being reevaluated. In 2004, it was redescribed by vertebrate paleontologists Jenny Clack and Per E. Ahlberg, who reclassified it as a new genus and species of early tetrapod. They established the genus name Occidens, referring to its presence west of better-known early tetrapod assemblages in Great Britain. The species name honors Portlock.

The jaw likely comes from the Altagoan Formation and, based on an analysis of fossilized pollen, dates to the late Tournaisian stage of the Early Carboniferous about 350 million years ago. The occurrence of Occidens in the Tournaisian makes it a critically important taxon because it lies within Romer's gap, a time interval spanning most of the Early Carboniferous in which few tetrapod fossils are known. Romer's gap separates the first appearance of tetrapods in the Late Devonian from the group's first evolutionary radiation toward the end of the Early Carboniferous. However, the relationship of Occidens to other early tetrapods both before and after the gap remain uncertain, which means that its context in tetrapod evolution remains unknown.

== Description ==
Clack and Ahlberg noted several distinctive features of Occidens, including a straight row of teeth along the coronoid bones on the inner surface of the lower jaw, an open groove for a lateral line sense organ on the jaw's outer surface, and a stepped shape to the connection between the dentary and angular bones. The jaw bone is deep, resembling those of Crassigyrinus and whatcheeriids (which both occur in Romer's gap) in overall appearance.

== Classification ==
In most phylogenetic trees produced by Clack and Ahlberg's 2004 analysis, Occidens fell near whatcheeriids and the Devonian taxon Tulerpeton, being more derived than all other Devonian taxa and more basal than Crassigyrinus and the post-Romer's Gap taxa Greererpeton and Megalocephalus. A 2008 phylogenetic analysis by paleontologists Marcello Ruta and John Bolt found Occidens to be the closest relative of Sigournea multidentata, a species from the end of the gap found in Iowa, but could not determine where these two taxa fit relative to other Early Carboniferous tetrapods.
