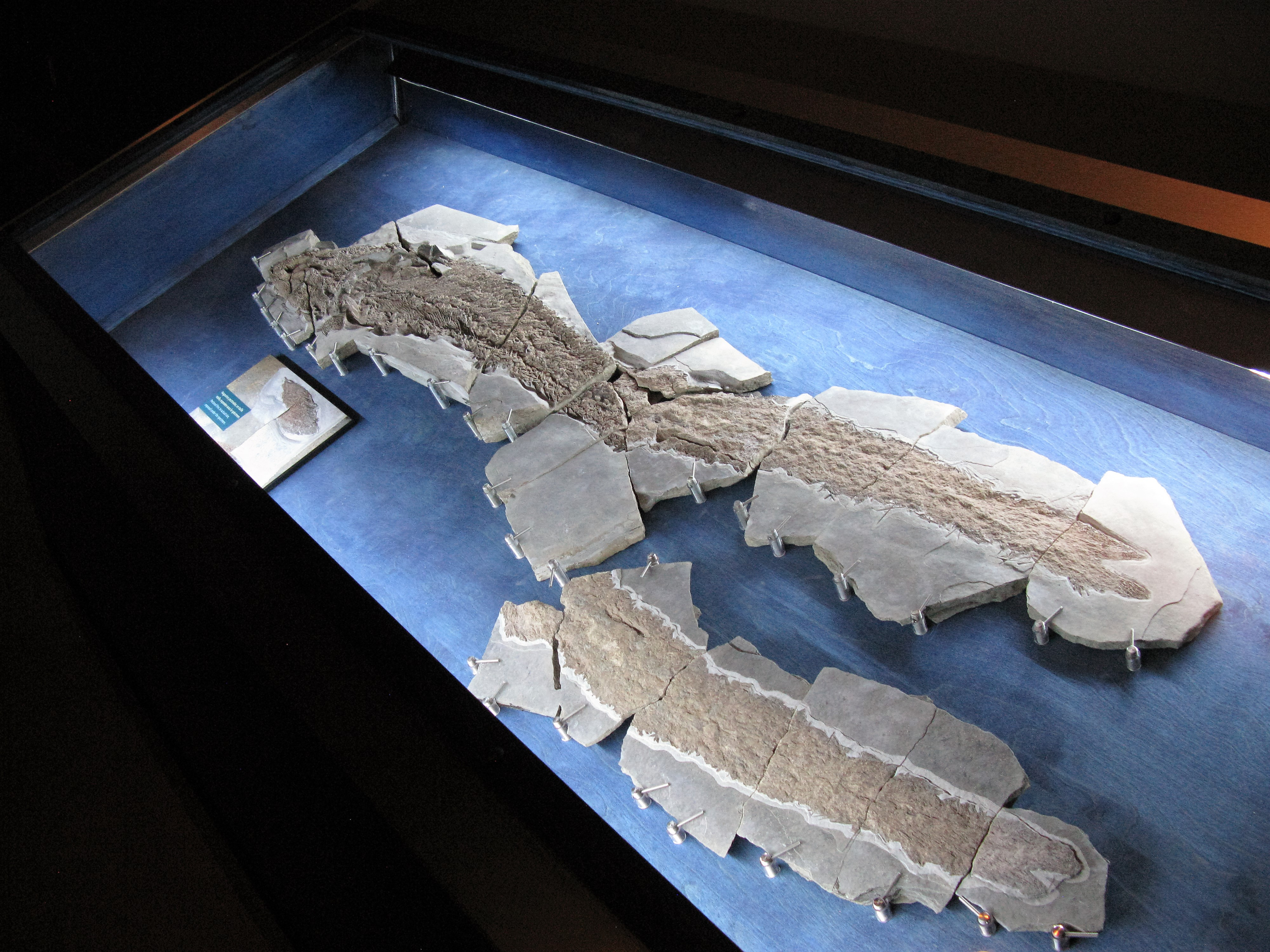
- Elpistostege watsoni on display at the Miguasha National Park

Scientific classification
- Kingdom: Animalia
- Phylum: Chordata
- Clade: Stegocephali
- Family: †Elpistostegidae
- Genus: †Elpistostege; Westoll, 1938
- Species: †E. watsoni

Binomial name
- †Elpistostege watsoni Westoll, 1938

= Elpistostege =

Elpistostege Temporal range: Frasnian

Extinct genus of tetrapodomorphs

Elpistostege is an extinct genus of finned tetrapodomorphs that lived during the Frasnian age of the Late Devonian epoch. Its only known species, E. watsoni, was first described in 1938 by the British palaeontologist Thomas Stanley Westoll, based on a single partial skull roof discovered at the Escuminac Formation in Quebec, Canada.

In 2010, a complete specimen was found in the same formation, which was described by Richard Cloutier and colleagues in 2020. It reveals that the paired fins of Elpistostege contained bones homologous to the phalanges (digit bones) of modern tetrapods; it is the most basal tetrapodomorph known to possess these bones. At the same time, the fins were covered in scales and lepidotrichia (fin rays), which indicates that the origin of phalanges preceded the loss of fin rays, rather than the other way around.

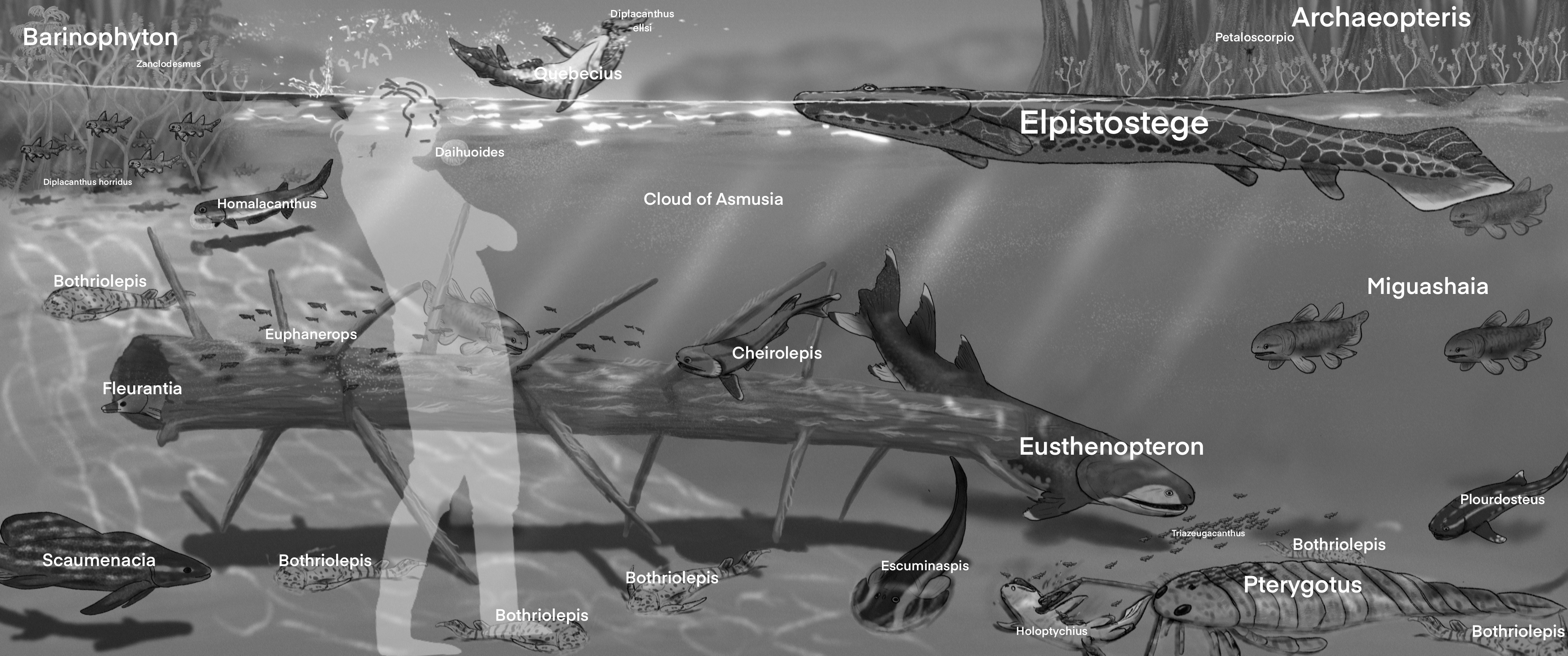
Elpistostege compared with various other devonian fauna

== Relationships ==
An analysis conducted by Swartz in 2012 found Elpistostege to be the sister taxon of Tiktaalik. Both were found to be primitive members of the group Elpistostegalia, along with other advanced stem-tetrapods.

- Elpistostegalia
  - Panderichthys
  - Stegocephalia sensu Laurin, 1998
    - - Tiktaalik
      - Elpistostege
    - Stegocephali sensu Laurin, 2020
      - Elginerpeton
      - - Ventastega
        - - Acanthostega
          - - Ichthyostega
            - - Whatcheeriidae
              - - Colosteidae
                - - Crassigyrinus
                  - - Baphetidae
                    - Crown group Tetrapoda

The 2020 study by Cloutier et al. instead recovers Elpistostege as the sister taxon of all limbed vertebrates, crownward of Tiktaalik:

- - Panderichthys
  - - - Tiktaalik
      - - Elpistostege
        - Limbed vertebrates
          - Ventastega
          - - Acanthostega
            - - Ichthyostega
              - Tulerpeton
