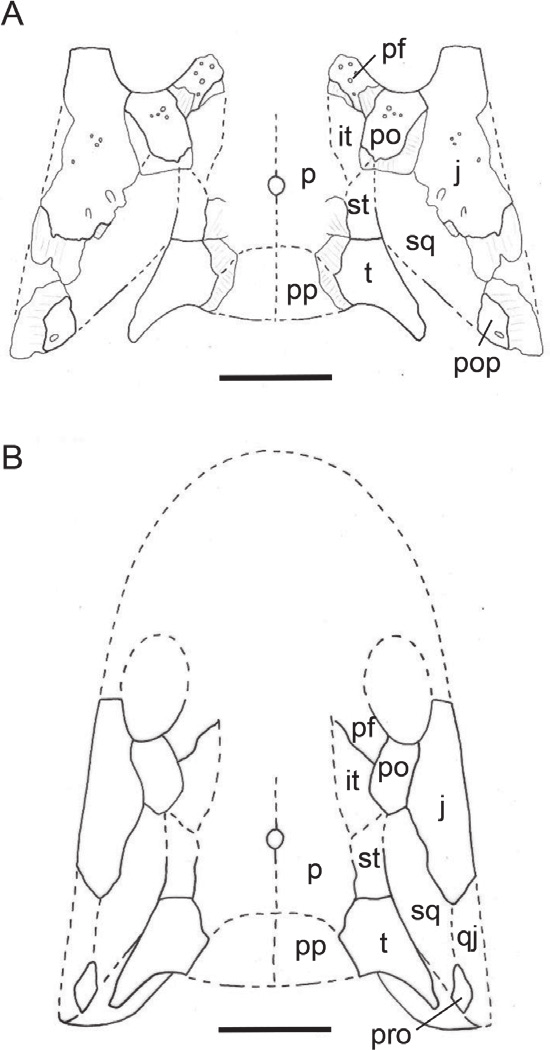

Scientific classification
- Domain: Eukaryota
- Kingdom: Animalia
- Phylum: Chordata
- Clade: Sarcopterygii
- Clade: Tetrapodomorpha
- Clade: Stegocephali
- Genus: †Ossirarus; Clack et al., 2016

Type species
- †Ossirarus kierani Clack et al., 2016

= Ossirarus =

Ossirarus Temporal range: mid-Tournaisian

Extinct genus of tetrapodomorphs

Ossirarus is an extinct genus of four-limbed stem-tetrapod from the Mississippian (mid-Tournaisian) of Scotland. It contains a single species, Ossirarus kierani, based on a disarticulated skull and postcranial bones from the Ballagan Formation at Burnmouth. It would have had a large, pointed tabular horn and several minor traits shared with Devonian stem-tetrapods. Ossirarus was described in a 2016 study which was devised to fill in the tetrapod and stem-tetrapod faunas of Romer's gap, an interval of the early Carboniferous with few tetrapod fossils. It was one of five new genera named in this study, along with Aytonerpeton, Diploradus, Koilops, and Perittodus.

== Discovery ==
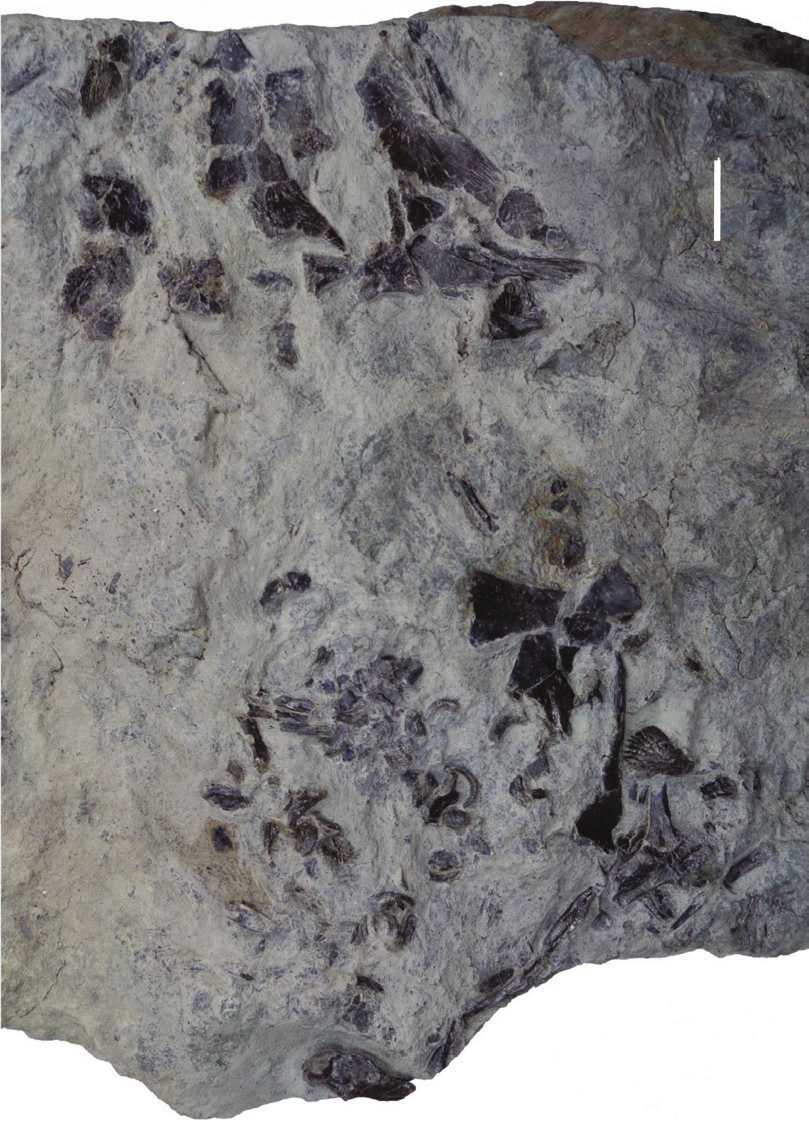
Holotype of Ossirarus kierani embedded in siltstone.

The holotype and only known specimen of Ossirarus, UMZC2016.3, was collected in 2010 from a mid-Tournaisian layer of cliffs in Burnmouth, in Scotland's Ballagan Formation. The strata belong to Romer's Gap, a hiatus between the Late Devonian and the Viséan where comparatively few known tetrapod fossils are known. The specimen was found in a layer of light gray sandy siltstone immediately above a gleyed palaeosol, located 340.5 metres (1,117 ft) above the base of the formation.

The holotype consists of multiple cranial and postcranial elements. Skull bones are disarticulated, and around two-thirds of the skull length has been preserved. The preorbital region is missing, as well as the jawbones, with the exception of a fragment belonging to either the maxilla or premaxilla. Postcranial material includes vertebral centra, neural arch and rib fragments, the pectoral girdle, both humeri and the left radius. Fragmentary scales are also preserved. The specimen was presumed to be an adult from the presence of interdigitated sutures.

The species was formally described in 2016. The generic name Ossirarus comes from Latin ossi, 'bones', and rarus, 'rare, scattered', while the specific epithet kierani honors two members of the local Burnmouth community who supported the study.

== Description ==
A unique characteristic of Ossirarus is the presence of a large, pointed tabular horn. Ossirarus also exhibits features similar to stem-amniotes, such as a contact between the tabular and parietal bones, and separation between the exoccipital and basioccipital bones. At the same time, more primitive features are also present, like an intertemporal bone.

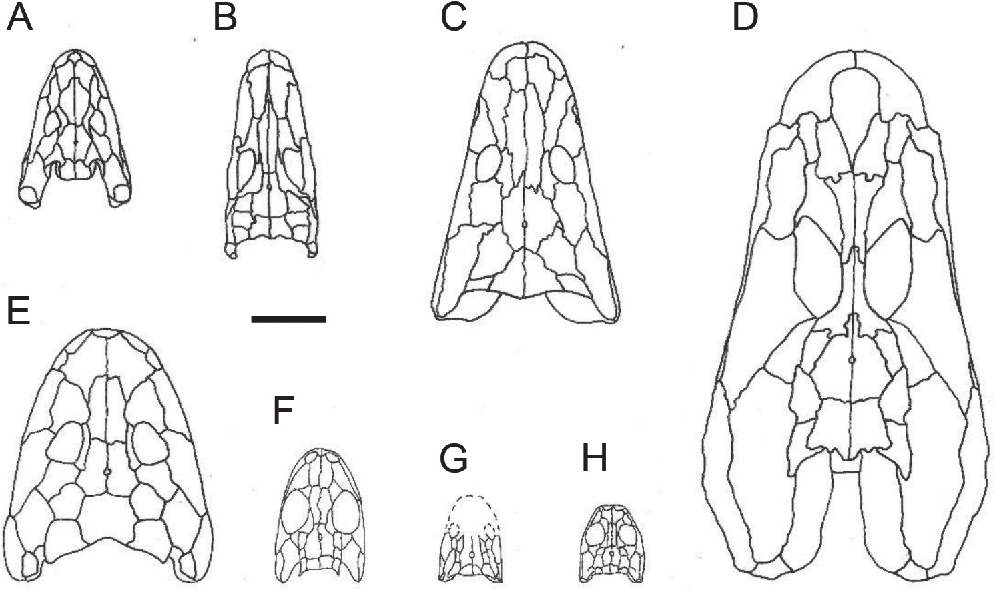
Skulls of early tetrapods drawn to scale (G: Ossirarus kierani)

At an estimated 54 millimetres (2.1 in) of skull length and 30 centimetres (12 in) of total length, Ossirarus was much smaller than Late Devonian and Tournaisian tetrapods like Pederpes, and more comparable in size to later Viséan genera from East Kirkton Quarry such as Balanerpeton. Unlike the terrestrial East Kirkton tetrapods, Ossirarus was more adapted for an aquatic or amphibious life and less reliant on vision, having lateral line canals in the skull as well as proportionally smaller orbits.

== Ecology ==
The deposit in which Ossirarus was found belonged to a floodplain environment, more specifically a marsh or seasonal water body evaporating during the dry season. Ossirarus shared its environment with the stem-tetrapod Aytonerpeton, as well as rhizodonts, actinopterygians, chondrichthyans and lungfish. Atmospheric oxygen was stable above 16%.

== Phylogeny ==
A provisional 2024 phylogenetic study recovered Ossirarus as a stem-tetrapod, placing it crownward of most Devonian genera, but branching before the Devonian Ymeria, Tulerpeton and Brittagnathus.
