= Perittodus =

Perittodus Temporal range: early mid-Tournaisian

Scientific classification
- Domain: Eukaryota
- Kingdom: Animalia
- Phylum: Chordata
- Clade: Sarcopterygii
- Clade: Tetrapodomorpha
- Clade: Stegocephali
- Genus: †Perittodus; Clack et al., 2016

Type species
- †Perittodus apsconditus Clack et al., 2016

Extinct genus of tetrapodomorphs

Perittodus is an extinct genus of four-limbed stem-tetrapod from the Mississippian (mid-Tournaisian) of Scotland. It contains a single species, Perittodus apsconditus, based on disarticulated skull and postcranial bones from the Ballagan Formation. The lower jaw of the holotype specimen was about 6.8 cm (2.7 in.) in length and had a pattern of dentition similar to the Devonian taxon Ymeria. Perittodus was described in a 2016 study which was devised to fill in the tetrapod and stem-tetrapod faunas of Romer's gap, an interval of the early Carboniferous with few vertebrate fossils. It was one of five new genera named in this study, along with Aytonerpeton, Diploradus, Koilops, and Ossirarus.
