= Mesanerpeton =

Mesanerpeton Temporal range: Tournaisian

Scientific classification
- Domain: Eukaryota
- Kingdom: Animalia
- Phylum: Chordata
- Clade: Sarcopterygii
- Clade: Tetrapodomorpha
- Clade: Stegocephali
- Genus: †Mesanerpeton; Smithson & Clack, 2017

Type species
- †Mesanerpeton woodi Smithson & Clack, 2017

Extinct genus of tetrapodomorphs

Mesanerpeton is an extinct genus of four-limbed stem-tetrapod from the Mississippian (Tournaisian) of Scotland. It contains a single species, Mesanerpeton woodi, (Note: which means 'Wood's intermediary crawler' named after its discoverer Stan Wood) who based on a disarticulated specimen including a clavicle, vertebrae, and forelimb bones from the Ballagan Formation. The vertebrae are poorly-ossified and similar to Crassigyrinus, but the forelimb was robust. The shape and level of torsion present in the humerus are intermediate between Devonian stem-tetrapods and later Carboniferous tetrapods. This transitional condition, and the associated rerouting of the brachial artery and median nerve, may indicate that Mesanerpeton had a higher stride length and more efficient locomotion on land compared to its predecessors.
