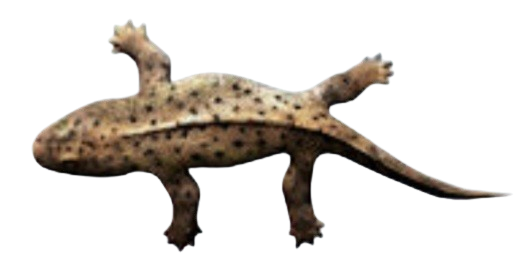
- Life reconstruction

Scientific classification
- Domain: Eukaryota
- Kingdom: Animalia
- Phylum: Chordata
- Clade: Sarcopterygii
- Clade: Tetrapodomorpha
- Clade: Stegocephali
- Genus: †Koilops; Clack et al., 2016

Type species
- †Koilops herma Clack et al., 2016

= Koilops =

Koilops Temporal range: early mid-Tournaisian

Extinct genus of tetrapodomorphs

Koilops is an extinct genus of four-limbed stem-tetrapod from the Mississippian (mid-Tournaisian) of Scotland. It contains a single species, Koilops herma, based on a mold of an 8.0 cm (3.1 in.)-long skull from the Ballagan Formation.

== Classification ==
A phylogenetic analysis in its original description places Koilops as a close relative of Tulerpeton and colosteids. Koilops was described in a 2016 study which was devised to fill in the tetrapod and stem-tetrapod faunas of Romer's gap, an interval of the early Carboniferous with few vertebrate fossils. It was one of five new genera named in this study, along with Aytonerpeton, Diploradus, Ossirarus, and Perittodus.
