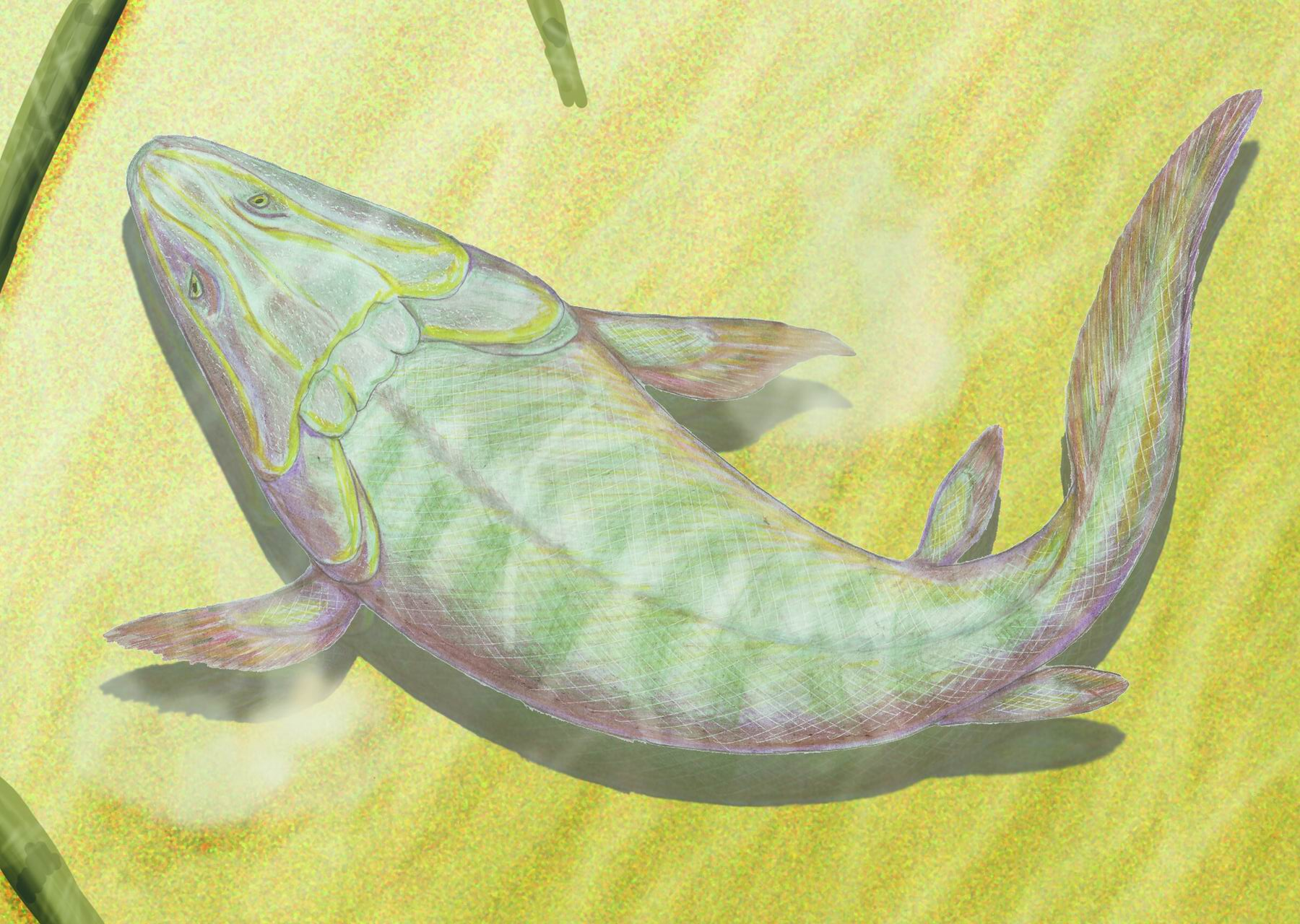
- Panderichthys

Scientific classification
- Kingdom: Animalia
- Phylum: Chordata
- Clade: Eotetrapodiformes
- Clade: Elpistostegalia; Camp & Allison, 1961

Subgroups
- †Howittichthys?; †Livoniana; †Panderichthys; †Parapanderichthys; †Qikiqtania; †Rubrognathus; †Tiktaalik; Stegocephali?

Synonyms
- Panderichthyida Vorobyeva, 1989

= Elpistostegalia =

Elpistostegalia Temporal range: Middle Devonian (Givetian) – Present, 385–0 Ma (Possible Eifelian record, 395 Ma)

Clade of tetrapodomorphs

Elpistostegalia is a clade containing Panderichthys and all more derived tetrapodomorph taxa. The earliest elpistostegalians, combining fishlike and tetrapod-like characteristics, such as Tiktaalik, are sometimes called fishapods. Although historically Elpistostegalia (referred to as Panderichthyida) was considered an order of prehistoric lobe-finned fishes, it was cladistically redefined to include tetrapods.

== Paleobiology ==
The Silurian–Devonian Terrestrial Revolution, which led to a rise in global oxygen content and the formation of vast swathes of riverine wetlands, allowed the evolution of large, predatory freshwater fish who were able to exploit the shallow waters of the littoral zone as ambush predators. Several groups of lobe-finned fish (in particular the dipnotetrapodomorphs) evolved to fill these shallow-water niches; the most successful clade among those were the demersal elpistostegalians, who developed limb-like paired fins that allowed them to better navigate the snag-abundant underwater terrains. In these freshwater environments, any aquatic animals would have been challenged periodically by fluctuating water levels and hypoxia, which exerted a selective pressure favoring the ability for direct gas exchange with air, either through the skin or via specialized air-breathing organs. In comparable modern aquatic environments like shallow eutrophic lakes and swamps, modern lungfish and some genera of catfish also rely on the more stable, atmospheric source of oxygen.

Being shallow-water fishes, the elpistostegalians evolved many of the basic adaptions that later allowed the tetrapods to become terrestrial animals. The most important ones were the shift of the main propulsion apparatus from the tail fin to the pectoral and pelvic fins, and a shift to reliance on an often-bifurcated, air-filled foregut diverticulum lined by capillary beds (which evolved into the lungs in dipnomorphs and tetrapodomorphs, and homologously into swim bladders in ray-finned fish) rather than on aquatic respiration via gills as the main means of obtaining oxygen. Both of these features appear to be a direct result of moving to a semiaquatic mode of living in shallow bankside zones of inland freshwaters, which (while challenging) allowed the elpistosteglians to both avoid larger aquatic predators from deeper waters and forage opportunistically from riparian habitats by temporarily venturing out of water onto the shores of floodplains.

Fossils of Panderichthys are dated to the Givetian (around 385 million years old) or the Frasnian (around 380–375 million years old). Thus, the oldest bone remains of elpistostegalians appear in the late Middle Devonian or in the early Late Devonian. However, a series of trace fossils from the early Middle Devonian of Poland suggests that tetrapod-limbed animals may have existed as early as in the Eifelian, around 395 million years ago.

== Traits ==
Paleontologist and professor Per E. Ahlberg has identified the following traits as synapomorphic for Elpistostegalia (and thus Tetrapoda):

- The endocranium is hinged, the hinge forming the profundus nerve foramen. The cranial kinesis is also visible in the skull roof, between the parietal bones and the postparietal bones.
- A rather small shoulder girdle is present.
- The anal and posterior dorsal fin supported by a basal plate and three unjointed radials.
- The pectoral fin skeleton is composed of bones homologous to the tetrapod humerus, ulna, and radius, followed by a host of smaller bones anchoring the fin rays; the pelvic fin skeleton similarly has femur, tibia, and fibula.

== Phylogeny ==
The name, originally coined around the genus Elpistostege, later become a synonym for Panderichthyida. In most analyses, the group as traditionally imagined is actually an evolutionary grade, the last "fishes" of the tetrapod stem line, though Chang and Yu (1997) treated them as the sister clade to Tetrapoda. Elpistostegalia was re-defined as a clade containing Panderichthys and tetrapods.

Below is a cladogram from Swartz, 2012.

- Eotetrapodiformes
  - Tristichopteridae
  - - Tinirau
    - - Platycephalichthys
      - Elpistostegalia
        - Panderichthys
        - - - Tiktaalik
            - Elpistostege
          - Stegocephali
            - Elginerpeton
            - - Ventastega
              - - Acanthostega
                - - Ichthyostega
                  - - Whatcheeriidae
                    - - Colosteidae
                      - - Crassigyrinus
                        - - Baphetidae
                          - Tetrapoda

The 2020 study by Cloutier et al. revealed that the paired fins of Elpistostege contained bones homologous to the phalanges (digit bones) of modern tetrapods. The analysis carried out in this study recovered Elpistostege as the sister taxon of all unequivocally digited vertebrates.

- Elpistostegalia
  - Panderichthys
  - - - Tiktaalik
      - Stegocephali
        - Elpistostege
        - - Ventastega
          - - Acanthostega
            - - Ichthyostega
              - Tulerpeton
