= Diploradus =

Diploradus Temporal range: mid-Tournaisian

Scientific classification
- Domain: Eukaryota
- Kingdom: Animalia
- Phylum: Chordata
- Clade: Sarcopterygii
- Clade: Tetrapodomorpha
- Clade: Stegocephali
- Genus: †Diploradus; Clack et al., 2016

Type species
- †Diploradus austiumensis Clack et al., 2016

Extinct genus of tetrapodomorphs

Diploradus is an extinct genus of four-limbed stem-tetrapod from the Mississippian (mid-Tournaisian) of Scotland. It contains a single species, Diploradus austiumensis, based on an incomplete skull and jaw fragments from the Ballagan Formation at Burnmouth. The most complete part of the specimen, the lower jaw, was about 3.0 cm (1.2 in.) in length and possessed several rows of small, numerous teeth. It likely represents a juvenile animal. Diploradus was described in a 2016 study which was devised to fill in the tetrapod and stem-tetrapod faunas of Romer's gap, an interval of the early Carboniferous with few vertebrate fossils. It was one of five new genera named in this study, along with Aytonerpeton, Koilops, Ossirarus, and Perittodus.
