= Beautiful Minds (TV programme) =

- Genre: Documentary
- Country of origin: United Kingdom
- No. of series: 2
- No. of episodes: 6

Production
- Running time: 1 hour

Original release
- Network: BBC Four
- Release: 7 April 2010 – 25 April 2012

Beautiful Minds is a British documentary television programme, produced by BBC and broadcast on BBC Four. The first series aired in April 2010, and the second series in April 2012. Each series consists of three episodes.

== Overview ==
The programme features significant British scientists who describe their big moment or discovery.

== Episodes ==
=== Series 1 (2010) ===
No. overall	No. in season	Scientist	Original release date
1	1	Jocelyn Bell Burnell	7 April 2010
Professor Dame Jocelyn Bell Burnell describes how she discovered pulsars, the by-products of supernova explosions which make life in the universe possible.
2	2	James Lovelock	14 April 2010
Environmentalist James Lovelock explains how his way of thinking led him not only to breakthroughs in atmospheric detection systems on Earth and Mars, but also to the Gaia hypothesis – a new way of thinking about the Earth as a holistic, self-regulating system.
3	3	Tim Hunt	21 April 2010
Biochemist Sir Tim Hunt at Cancer Research UK, who was awarded the Nobel Prize in 2001 for his discovery of the mechanism of how cells divide, recalls moments in his life that provided inspiration for his career as a scientist.

=== Series 2 (2012) ===
No. overall	No. in season	Scientist	Original release date
4	1	Jenny Clack	11 April 2012
Jenny Clack, Professor of Vertebrate Palaeontology at Cambridge University, recounts how she overcame setbacks before she found and described a fossil which offered new evidence of how fish made the transition onto land.
5	2	Andre Geim	18 April 2012
Andre Geim, Professor of Physics at the University of Manchester, reveals how his playful approach to his research helped him uncover the properties of graphene, the world's thinnest material, and won him the 2010 Nobel Prize in Physics.
6	3	Richard Dawkins	25 April 2012
Professor Richard Dawkins reveals how he came to write The Selfish Gene in 1976, an explosive book which divided the scientific community and made him the most influential evolutionary biologist of his generation, and how this made him an outspoken spokesman for atheism.
