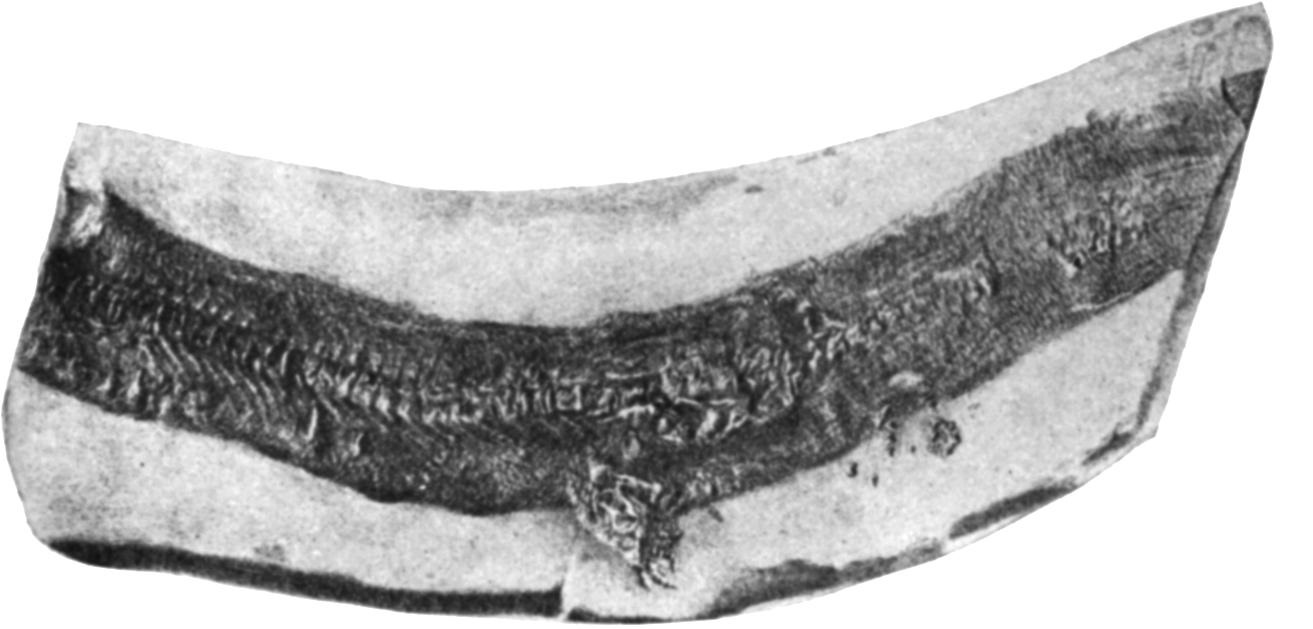
- Holotype specimen

Scientific classification
- Kingdom: Animalia
- Phylum: Chordata
- Genus: †Ichthyerpeton; Wright & Huxley, 1866
- Species: †I. bradleyae

Binomial name
- †Ichthyerpeton bradleyae Wright & Huxley, 1866

= Ichthyerpeton =

Ichthyerpeton Temporal range: Langsettian (late Bashkirian)

Extinct genus of tetrapodomorphs

Ichthyerpeton is an extinct genus of stegocephalian ("tetrapod") from the Pennsylvanian of Ireland. It was originally described by E.P. Wright and Thomas Henry Huxley in 1866, based on an articulated partial skeleton from the Jarrow coal seam in County Kilkenny. It was redescribed in 2021 by Aodhán Ó Gogáin and Patrick N. Wyse Jackson, who used X-ray tomography to peer through the dense coating of scales which obscures many bones. The body was very elongated, with tall diplospondylous vertebrae similar to those of embolomeres. The fossil includes a stout hindlimb with distinct digits and a proportionally short tibia. Though previously considered an embolomere, colosteid, or long-bodied temnospondyl, Ichthyerpeton has a unique combination of features which prevents an unambiguous placement among these tetrapod groups.
