= Metaxygnathus =

Metaxygnathus Temporal range: Famennian

Scientific classification
- Kingdom: Animalia
- Phylum: Chordata
- Clade: Elpistostegalia
- Genus: †Metaxygnathus; Campbell & Bell, 1977

Type species
- †Metaxygnathus denticulus Campbell & Bell, 1977

Extinct genus of tetrapodomorphs

Metaxygnathus is an extinct genus of ichthyostegalian found in Late Devonian deposits of New South Wales, Australia. It is known only from a lower jawbone. Previously thought to be a lobe-finned fish, it has now been reassigned to the earliest group of tetrapodomorphs.
