= Doragnathus =

Doragnathus Temporal range: Early Carboniferous

Scientific classification
- Domain: Eukaryota
- Kingdom: Animalia
- Phylum: Chordata
- Clade: Tetrapoda
- Class: incertae sedis
- Genus: †Doragnathus; Smithson, 1980

Type species
- †Doragnathus woodi Smithson, 1980

Extinct genus of tetrapodomorphs

Doragnathus is an extinct genus of stem-tetrapod from the Early Carboniferous of Scotland.
