= Livoniana =

Livoniana Temporal range: Devonian

Scientific classification
- Kingdom: Animalia
- Phylum: Chordata
- Clade: Eotetrapodiformes
- Clade: Elpistostegalia
- Genus: †Livoniana
- Species: †L. multidentata

Binomial name
- †Livoniana multidentata Ahlberg et al., 2000

Extinct genus of tetrapodomorphs

Livoniana is a genus of prehistoric tetrapodomorphs which lived during the Devonian period (Givetian - Frasnian stages, about 374 to 391 million years ago).

This species is a transitional form between fish and the earliest tetrapods, like Tiktaalik, Ichthyostega and Acanthostega. Before Livoniana there was Elginerpeton and Obruchevichthys.

Four legs developed in water, not on land, to better escape waterliving predatory creatures like Hyneria. There were very lush forests, and particularly swamps, where four limbs became very useful to avoid predators.
