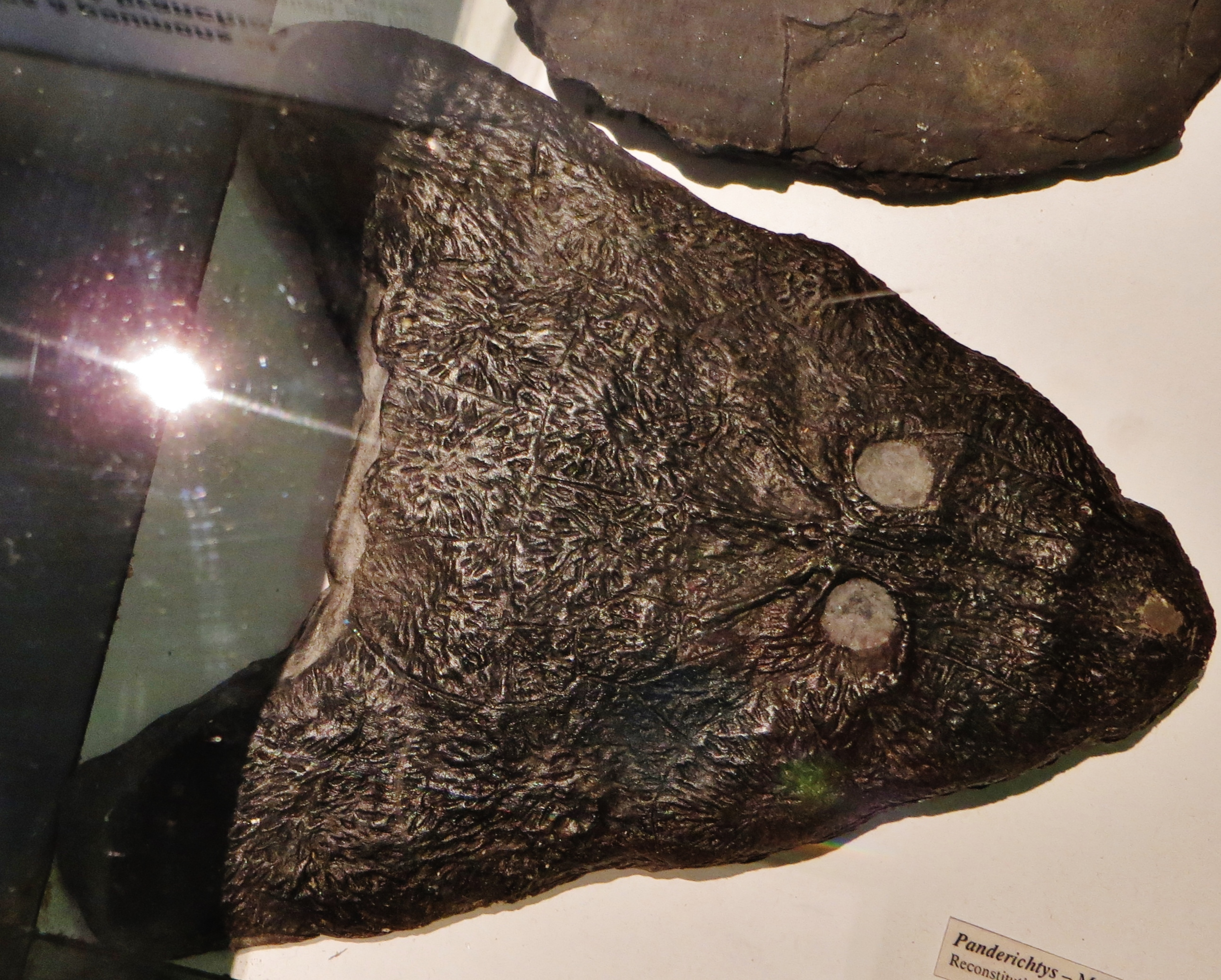
- Skull cast, Musee d'Histoire Naturelle, Lille

Scientific classification
- Kingdom: Animalia
- Phylum: Chordata
- Clade: Elpistostegalia
- Family: †Panderichthyidae; Vorobyeva, 1968
- Genus: †Panderichthys; Gross, 1941

Type species
- †Panderichthys rhombolepis Gross, 1941

Species
- †P. stolbovi? Vorobyeva, 1960; †P. rhombolepis Gross, 1941

= Panderichthys =

Panderichthys Temporal range: Late Devonian, 380 Ma Possible Early Devonian Records

Extinct genus of tetrapodomorphs

Panderichthys is a genus of extinct sarcopterygian (lobe-finned fish) from the late Devonian period, about 380 Mya. Panderichthys, which was recovered from Frasnian (early Late Devonian) deposits in Latvia, is represented by two species. P. stolbovi is known only from some snout fragments and an incomplete lower jaw. P. rhombolepis is known from several more complete specimens. Although it probably belongs to a sister group of the earliest tetrapods, Panderichthys exhibits a range of features transitional between tristichopterid lobe-fin fishes (e.g., Eusthenopteron) and early tetrapods. It is named after the German-Baltic paleontologist Christian Heinrich Pander. Possible tetrapod tracks dating back to before the appearance of Panderichthys in the fossil record were reported in 2010, which suggests that Panderichthys is not a direct ancestor of tetrapods, but nonetheless shows the traits that evolved during the fish-tetrapod evolution.

== Discovery and history ==
Panderichthys is represented by two different species: Panderichthys rhombolepis and Panderichthys stobolvi. P. rhombolepis was discovered by Gross in 1930 and P. stobolvi was discovered and figured by Emilia Vorobyeva in 1960. P. rhombolepis was discovered in Lode, Latvia within Frasnian deposits and according to P.E. Ahlberg can definitely be found in other Frasnian deposits in Latvia. Although fossils of Panderichthys have been known for a long time, they have only recently been examined in full. The first time they were recognized as being phylogenetically closer to tetrapods than fish was by Shultze and Arsenault in 1985.

== Description ==
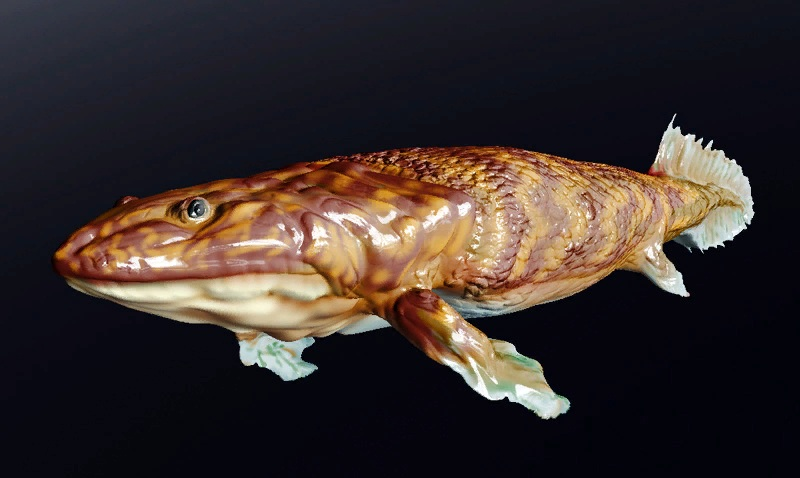
Digital restoration

Panderichthys is a 1.5–2 m (4 ft 11 in – 6 ft 7 in) long fish with a large tetrapod-like head that is flattened, narrow at the snout and wide in the back. The intracranial joint, which is characteristic of most lobe-fin fishes, has been lost from the external elements of the skull, but is still present in the braincase. The patterns of external bones in the skull roof and cheeks are more similar to those of early tetrapods than those of other lobe-fins. The transitional qualities of Panderichthys are also evident in the rest of the body. It lacks the dorsal and anal fins (fish fin) and its tail is more like those of early tetrapods than the caudal fins of other lobe-fins. The shoulders exhibit several tetrapod-like features, while the humerus is longer than those found in other lobe-fins. The vertebral column is ossified throughout its length and the vertebrae are comparable to those of early tetrapods. On the other hand, the distal parts of the front fins are unlike those of tetrapods. As would be expected from a fin, there are numerous lepidotrichia (long and thin fin rays).

Panderichthys has many features that can be considered an intermediate form during the fish-tetrapod evolution and displays some features that are more derived than its phylogenetic position indicates, while others that are more basal. The body form of Panderichthys and Tiktaalik represents a major step in the transition from fish to tetrapods and they were even able to haul out on land. According to Shultze and Trueb, Panderichthys shares ten features with tetrapods:

- The skull roof is flat compared to fish skulls.
- The orbits are more dorsal and lie closer together.
- The external naris is close to the margin of the upper jaw.
- Frontals are paired.
- There is no external intracranial joint.
- The parietal bone is located between the orbits and main portion posterior to orbits.
- In P. rhombolepis, the squamosal touches the maxilla (varies among specimens though).
- The teeth have a complex polyplocodont structure.
- A lack of median fins.
- In panderichthyids and Ichthyostega, the ribs are attached to the neural arch and there is an intercentrum.

=== Humerus ===
One of the key transitional features of Panderichthys is its humerus. During the transition from fish to tetrapods the limbs began to move and became located at a right angle to the body rather than being oriented toward the posterior end. As a result, the muscles became perpendicular to the body and caused the limbs to move in a more anteroposterior and dorsoventral pattern. This in turn affected the shape of the humerus and as a result early tetrapods have an L-shaped humerus. Due to a recent discovery of a humerus of Panderichthys that was not flattened, the specimen could be analyzed in much greater detail. The humerus of Panderichthys displays a variety of features including ones that are both primitive and derived. Despite being placed as basal to Tiktaalik, the humerus of Panderichthys has features that are more derived, but overall is very similar. Both Panderichthys and Tiktaalik have humeri that are dorsoventrally flattened with a blade like entepicondyle curving ventrally, separated epipodial facets, a latissimus dorsi process and ectepicondule process that is parallel to the preaxial margin. The humeri of both species are considered transitional forms because they are almost L-shaped, have a low latissimus dorsi process, a low entepicondyle, and an intermediate entepicondylar canal. The humerus of Panderichthys is more derived than that of Tiktaalik because of the presence of a more preaxially oriented radial facet as well as a more slender shaft. One feature that is unique to Panderichthys is that the entepicondyle does not project as far as the epipodial facets and the humeral ridge does not go into the entepicondyle. The result of the analysis of the humerus of Panderichthys is that the transition of the humerus from the fish-like organisms to tetrapods occurred much slower than previously thought and Panderichthys now provides a base to determine many autapomorphies. Due to the orientation of the fin towards the posterior end, the attitude of the limb is more horizontal than vertical and the operational space in which it acts is level to the shoulder joint, which causes the muscles to pull at a right angle to the body. This resulted in the ability of Panderichthys to prop up its large head most likely to breathe.

=== Fins and digits ===
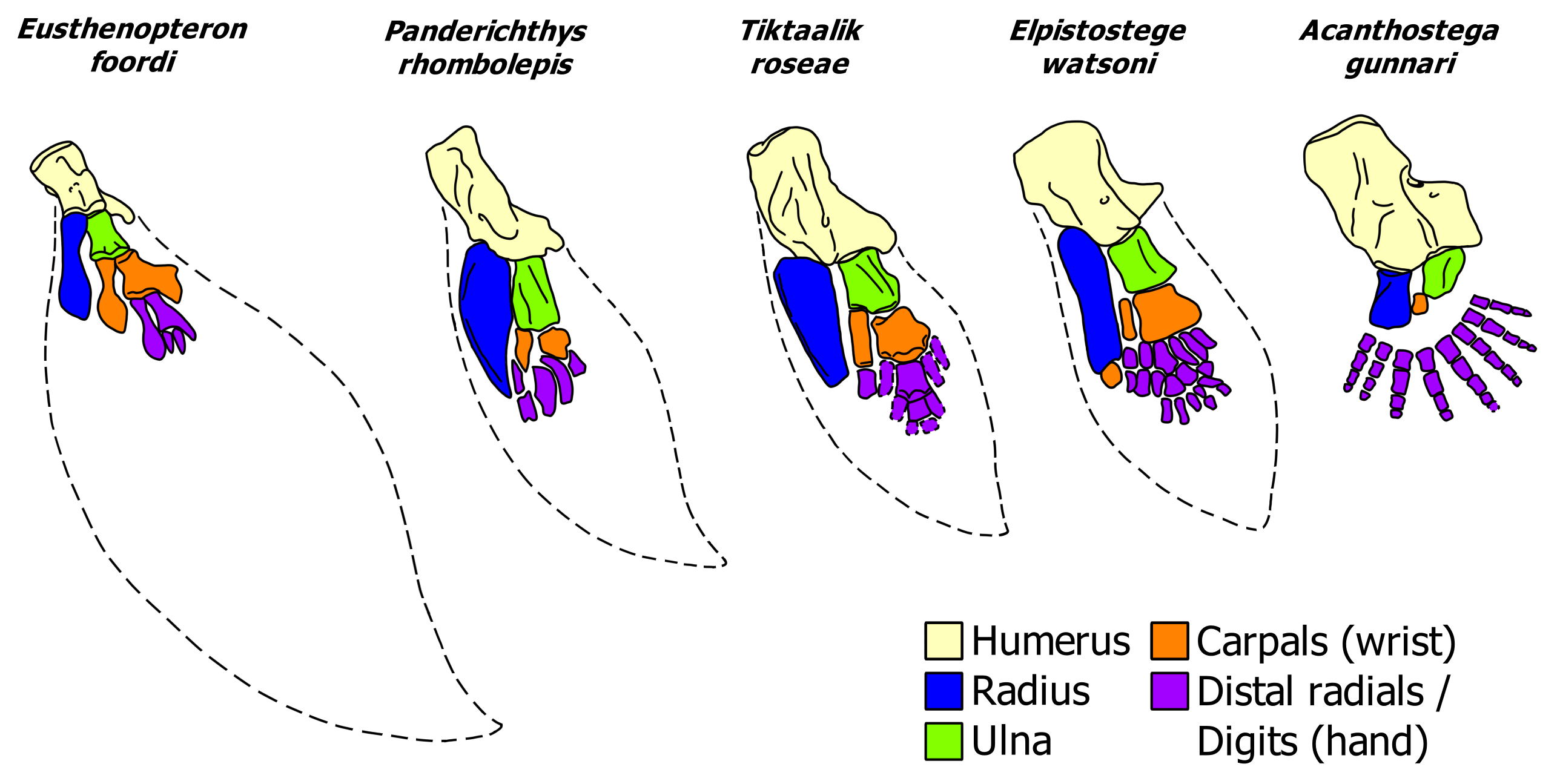
Comparisons between tetrapodomorphs during the transition from pectoral fins to forelimbs. Panderichthys is second from the left.

Another key feature of Panderichthys is its intermediate form during the evolution of digits. In the past it was believed that digits and fingers had no analogous part in sarcopterygian fish and were evolutionary novelties. However, a reexamination of existing Panderichthys fossils using a CT scanner shows at least four very clearly differentiated distal radial bones at the end of the fin skeletal structure. This study, performed by Boisvert et al. in 2008, examined the pectoral fins of Panderichthys and found that the fins of Panderichthys are oriented anteroposteriorly, which is different from the limbs of tetrapods that project at an angle from the body. The humerus, radius, and ulna all are recognizable as analogous to the parts in tetrapods.

CT scans allowed the authors to see below the scales and lepidotrichia (fin rays), uncovering the distal fin endoskeleton for the first time. The CT scan displayed an ulnare, a blocky carpal (wrist bone) that articulates with the ulna and two terminal radials. The wrist also included a more slender intermedium, articulating in line to the lateral ridge of the ulna. The CT scan additionally uncovered radials that can be interpreted as digits, disputing the hypothesis that digits are entirely new structures in tetrapods. These finger-like bones show neither muscle development nor joints and they are extremely small, but nonetheless show an intermediate form between fully fish-like fins and tetrapods. Similar to the humerus, Panderichthys also has a more derived feature similar to tetrapods and unlike Tiktaalik: the ulna is significantly longer than the ulnare.

=== Pelvic girdle ===
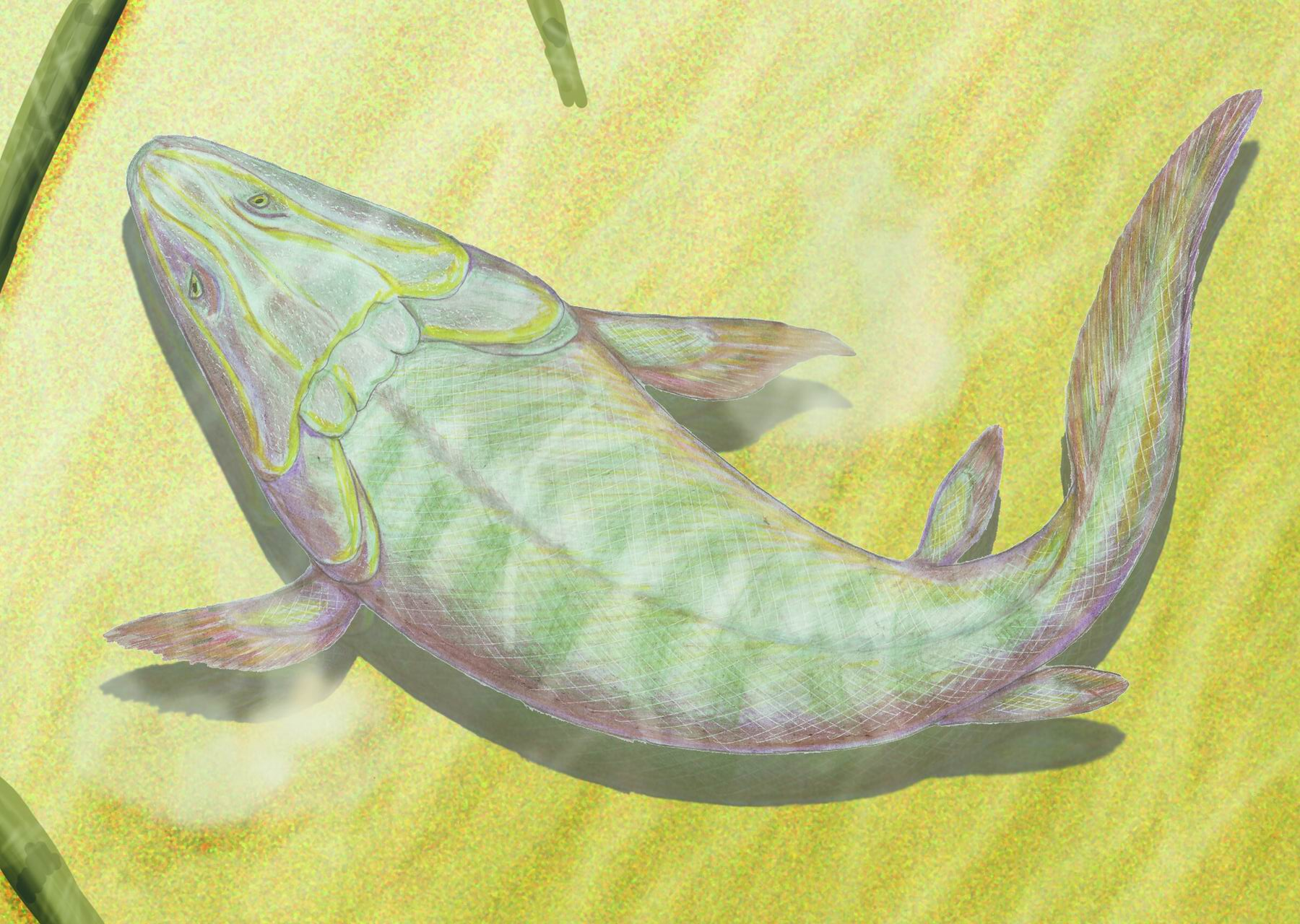
Restoration showing side to side undulation

The pelvic girdle (hip) and pelvic fins of Panderichthys represents an intermediate in the fish-tetrapod evolution. During the fish-tetrapod evolution the pelvic girdle became a weight bearing structure when the ilium, meso-ventral contact of the sides of the girdle, an ilium, and a sacral rib developed. The femur and humerus became longer and the radius/ulna and tibia/fibula became more equal in length. In general, the pelvic girdle in Panderichthys is more primitive than the pectoral girdle. This is due to the humerus of Panderichthys being a shape that is more of an intermediate, while the femur is more primitive because of the length ratio to the fibula and that it lacks an adductor blade and crest. This implies that Panderichthys was not capable of tetrapod-like hindlimb propelled locomotion because of its small pelvic fins, non-weight bearing pelvic girdle, acetebelum oriented posteriorly, and limited knee and elbow flexion. Boisvert describes the locomotion of Panderichthys as possibly using one of its pectoral fins to anchor itself while side to side undulation propels the body forward.

=== Skull ===
The braincase of Panderichthys demonstrates a key intermediate within the fish-evolution sequence. From the outside, Panderichthys has a tetrapod-like head, but actually retains an intracranial joint that is a characteristic of fish. Panderichthys shares many features with the osteolepiform Eusthenopteron such as similar hyomandibular and basipterygoid processes. Even though its head is shaped similar to that of a tetrapod, tetrapod craniums lack a lateral commissure, jugular groove, basicranial fenestra, arcual plate, and intracranial joint, all of which are present in Panderichthys. What this means is that there was no major change of the braincase construction since the first sarcopterygian, but instead there had been only changes in skull shape. This implies that the evolution of the braincase during the transition from fish-tetrapod was very rapid and seems to display the same timing as the evolution of the pelvic girdle. In general, Panderichthys demonstrates that the braincase structure evolved much more slowly than the external skull morphology that created the tetrapod-like appearance of the head.

As for the lower jaw and dentition, the lower jaw is similar to Rhipidistians and is composed of a tooth-bearing dentary, four intradentaries, a lingual prearticular, three coronoids, and an adsymphsial plate dorsally. In addition, the teeth are of polyplocodont structure.

== Paleobiology ==
=== Respiration ===
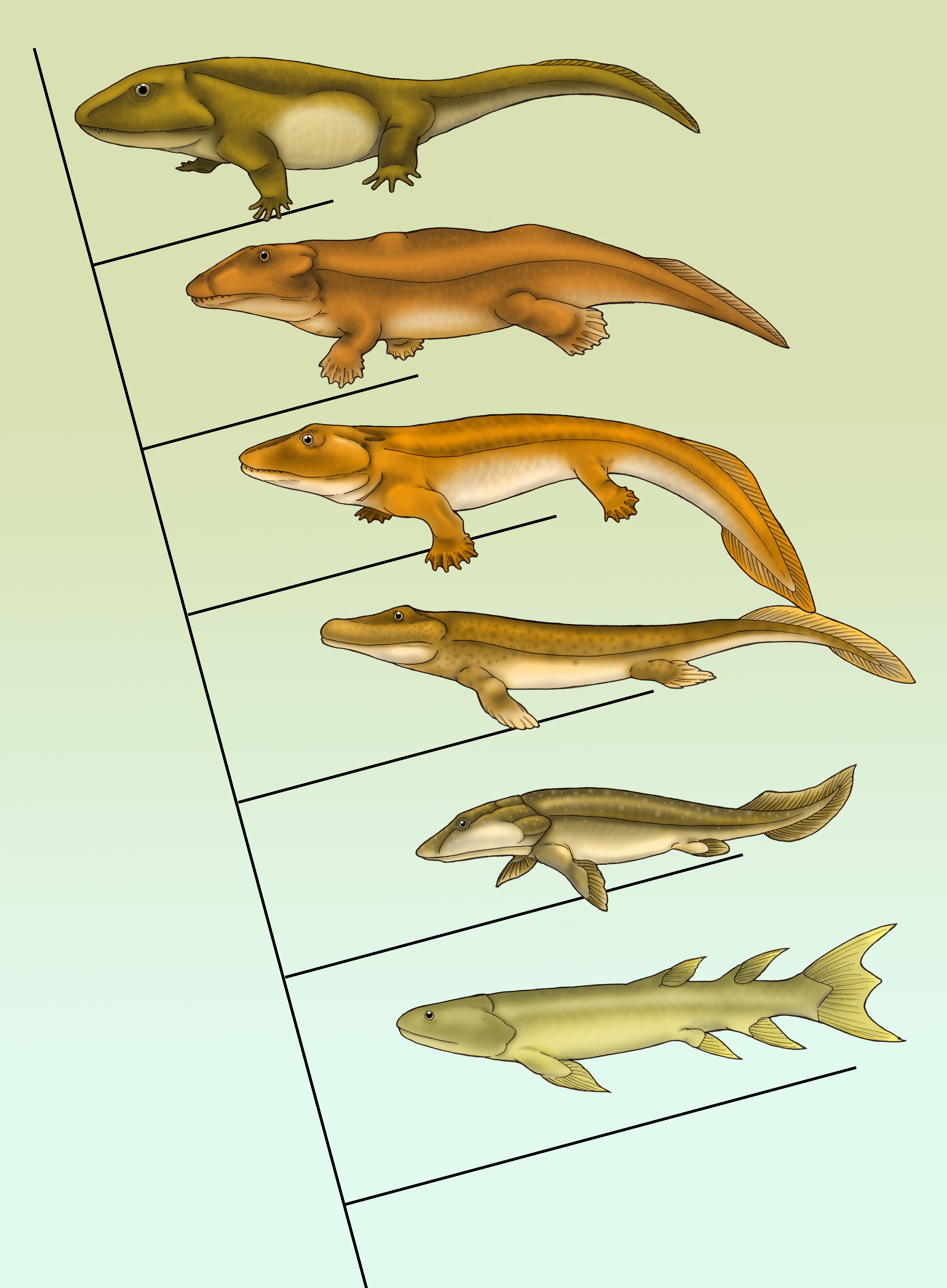
Panderichthys (second from the bottom) in an evolutionary context with other tetrapodomorphs

As an intermediate in the fish-tetrapod evolution, Panderichthys had the capacity to breathe air. The trend from the early sarcopterygians to the first tetrapods was an increase in the size of the spiracular chamber and its opening to the outside. Compared to Eusthenopteron, the spiracular chamber of Panderichthys is greatly expanded and the hyomandibula is shorter compared to those in fish. The opercular series was also shorter compared to other osteolepiforms. On either side of the skull, Panderichthys has a single external nasal opening and a palatal choana. In contrast to earlier osteolepiforms, the palatal choana is elongated and the nariochoanal lamina is narrow. Along with the spiracular chamber, this feature in Panderichthys can be considered transitional during the evolution from fish to tetrapods. Sarcopterygians such as Panderichthys can be considered at least facultative air breathers and demonstrate an intermediate form as air breathing was becoming more abundant.

During the Frasnian in which Panderichthys was extant, there was a drop in oxygen in the atmosphere as well as an increase in the abundance of plants. Due to the fact that oxygen is much less soluble in water than air, the decreased oxygen in the atmosphere would have caused the oxygen concentrations in any type of water to decrease substantially. This in turn would have caused any aquatic animal that could breathe air to have an advantage and be more likely to thrive. In addition to its ability to move in shallow water, Panderichthys could also breathe air. Its strong pectoral fins in theory could allow it to prop up its head in shallow water and take a breath. The enlargement of the spiracular chamber itself as well as its opening to the outside suggests that Panderichthys was part of a transition to an increased capacity for air breathing that was completed in tetrapods.

== Classification ==
Zachelmie tracks vs selected Devonian fossils

Panderichthys is a member of a group of tetrapod-like fish known as Panderichthyida or Elpistostegalia. Other well-preserved elpistostegalians include Elpistostege (from Quebec) and Tiktaalik (from Arctic Canada). Episostegalians in the narrow sense may be a grade (a paraphyletic group defined by ancestral anatomical conditions) or a clade (a monophyletic group defined by exclusive shared ancestry). More recent studies tend to redefine Elpistostegalia in an expanded format, as a clade starting at Panderichthys and encompassing everything as far as living tetrapods (the tetrapod crown group).

In January 2010, Nature reported well-preserved and "securely dated" tetrapod tracks from Polish marine tidal flat sediments approximately 397 million years old. These fossil tracks suggest that a group of two meter long tetrapods lived in the fully marine intertidal or lagoonal areas on the south coast of Laurussia during the time elpistostegalians were living. This implies that Panderichthys (and relatives like Elpistostege and Tiktaalik) were not direct ancestors to tetrapods, and represents their own adaptive morphology. Under this interpretation, Panderichthys can only be a "late-surviving relic", showing traits that convergently evolved during the transition from fish-like creatures to tetrapods, but whose date does not reflect that transition. The tracks "force a radical reassessment of the timing, ecology and environmental setting of the fish–tetrapod transition, as well as the completeness of the body fossil record."

== Palaeoecology ==
=== Paleoenvironment ===
Late Devonian fish and tetrapods

Panderichthys was alive during the late Devonian (Frasnian) in Lode, Latvia. Lode is known to be a marginal marine environment and it has been hypothesized that Panderichthys was adapted for movement in shallow and debris filled waters. Panderichthys was collected in deposits that were formerly believed to be from a calm freshwater basin, but have proven to be from shallow tidal flats or an estuary. The Lode Formation, where P. rhombolepis was found, occurs within a 200-meter thick layer composed of fine grained sandstone and clay along with finely dispersed clays. Nearly every major taxa of late Devonian vertebrates are represented within the Lode Formation. Most of the specimens are well preserved due to anaerobic substrate conditions as well as rapid burial in depressions on the submarine delta slopes. P. rhombolepis was discovered in the Gauja Regional formation within the lower Frasnian section. Taphocoenosis was characterized as in finely displaced clay and silty clay as well as low water activity.

=== Diet ===
Within this environment it has been hypothesized that P. rhombolepis was a large predator and fed upon dipterids, small and juvenile sarcopterygians, and Latvius. Associated vertebrates found in the same deposits include an armored jawless fish (Psammolepis), two placoderms (Asterolepis and Plourdosteus), an unidentified acanthodid acanthodian, a porolepiform lobe-fin (Laccognathus), a lungfish (Dipterus), and another elpistostegalian (Livoniana). Heterostracan (armored jawless fish) specimens showing bite marks are found at every formation which produces Panderichthys fossils. Panderichthys is an outlier in size and bite mark co-occurrence compared to many other jawed vertebrates, so it may have been a major predator of heterostracans.

== See also ==
- Eusthenopteron
- Elpistostege
- Tiktaalik
