= Romer's gap =

Gap in the tetrapod fossil record

Romer's gap is an apparent period of fossil sparseness in the Paleozoic tetrapod fossil record noted in the studies of paleontology and evolutionary biology, which represent a timespan in the Early Carboniferous (spanning the Tournaisian and the early part of the Visean) from which American paleontologist Alfred Romer in 1956 noted excavators had not yet found relevant transitional fossils. In the 2010s, it became understood that tetrapod material from the Ballagan Formation of Scotland belonged to the period of Romer's gap, thereby filling the apparent lack of fossils from the timespan.

Romer's gap
Axis scale: millions of years ago. Known fossil ranges. Ghost lineages. 1: "Anthracosauria" 2: Temnospondyli 3: "Microsauria" 4: Seymouriamorpha 5: Diadectidae 6: Nectridea 7: Aistopoda 8: Amniota 9: Baphetidae 10: Colosteidae 11: Gephyrostegidae 12: Casineria 13: Crassigyrinus 14: Whatcheeriidae 15: Adelogyrinidae 16: Ventastega 17: Ichthyostega 18: Acanthostega 19: Tulerpeton References: Smithson et al. (2012)

== Age ==
Romer's gap runs from approximately 360 to 345 million years ago, corresponding to the first 15 million years of the Carboniferous, the early Mississippian (starting with the Tournaisian and moving into the Visean). The gap forms a discontinuity between the primitive forests and high diversity of fishes at the end Devonian and more modern aquatic and terrestrial assemblages of the early Carboniferous.

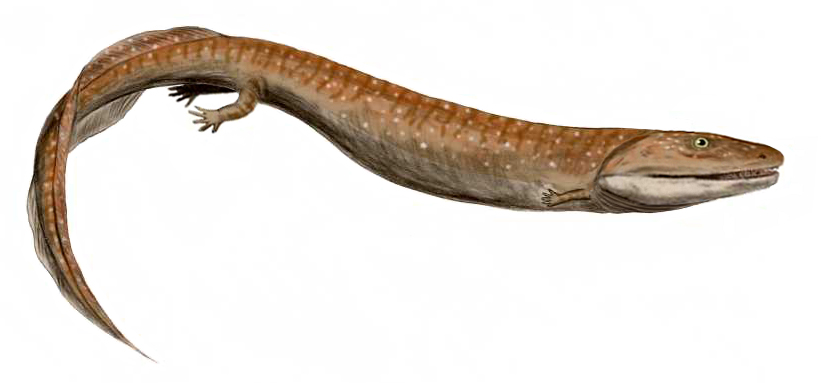
Crassigyrinus, a secondarily aquatic non-amniote tetrapod from Romer's gap

== Mechanism behind the gap ==
There has been long debate as to why there are so few fossils from this time period. Some have suggested the problem was of fossilization itself, suggesting that there may have been differences in the geochemistry of the time that did not favour fossil formation. Also, excavators simply may not have dug in the right places. The existence of a true low point in vertebrate diversity has been supported by independent lines of evidence. However, recent finds in five new locations in Scotland have yielded multiple fossils of early tetrapods and amphibians. They have also allowed the most accurate logging of the geology of this period. This new evidence suggests that - at least locally - there was no gap in diversity or changes in oxygen geochemistry.

While initial arthropod terrestriality was well under way before the gap, and some digited tetrapods might have come on land, there are remarkably few terrestrial or aquatic fossils that date from the gap itself. Recent work on Paleozoic geochemistry has provided evidence for the biological reality of Romer's gap in both terrestrial vertebrates and arthropods, and has correlated it with a period of unusually low atmospheric oxygen concentration, which was determined from the idiosyncratic geochemistry of rocks formed during Romer's gap. The new sedimentary logging in the Ballagan Formation in Scotland challenges this, suggesting oxygen was stable throughout Romer's Gap.

Aquatic vertebrates, which include most tetrapods during the Carboniferous, were recovering from the Hangenberg event, a major extinction event that preceded Romer's gap, one on par with that which killed the dinosaurs. In this end-Devonian extinction, most marine and freshwater groups became extinct or were reduced to a few lineages, although the precise mechanism of the extinction is unclear. Before the event, oceans and lakes were dominated by lobe-finned fishes and armored fishes called placoderms. After the gap, modern ray finned fish, as well as sharks and their relatives were the dominant forms. The period also saw the demise of the Ichthyostegalia, the early fish-like amphibians with more than five digits.

The low diversity of marine fishes, particularly shell-crushing predators (durophages), at the beginning of Romer's gap is supported by the sudden abundance of hard-shelled crinoid echinoderms during the same period. The Tournaisian has even been called the "Age of Crinoids". Once the number of shell-crushing ray-finned fishes and sharks increased later in the Carboniferous, coincident with the end of Romer's gap, the diversity of crinoids with Devonian-type armor plummeted, following the pattern of a classic predator-prey (Lotka-Volterra) cycle. There is increasing evidence that lungfish and stem tetrapods and amphibians recovered quickly and diversified in the rapidly changing environment of the end-Devonian and Romer's Gap.

== Gap fauna ==
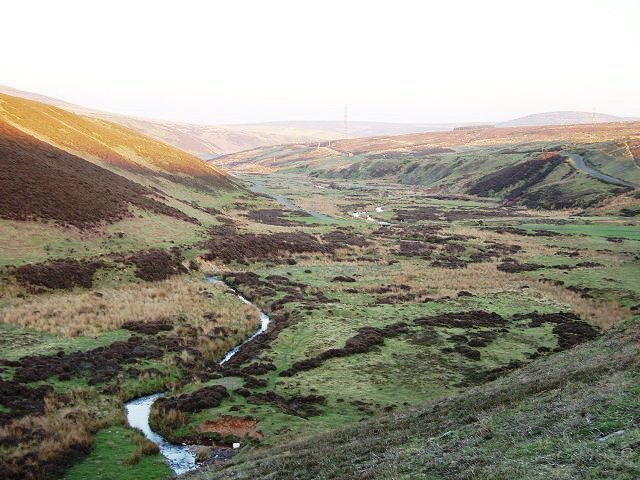
The bank of the Whiteadder Water in Scotland is one of the few known localities bearing fossils of tetrapods from Romer's gap.

The gap in the tetrapod record has been progressively closed with the discoveries of such early Carboniferous tetrapods as Pederpes and Crassigyrinus. There are a few sites where vertebrate fossils have been found to help fill in the gap, such as the East Kirkton Quarry, in Bathgate, Scotland, a long-known fossil site that was revisited by Stanley P. Wood in 1984 and has since been revealing a number of early tetrapods in the mid Carboniferous; "literally dozens of tetrapods came rolling out: Balanerpeton (a temnospondyl), Silvanerpeton and Eldeceeon (basal anthracosaurs), all in multiple copies, and one spectacular proto-amniote, Westlothiana", Paleos Project reports. In 2016, five new species were found across the Ballagan Formation: Perittodus apsconditus, Koilops herma, Ossirarus kierani, Diploradus austiumensis, Aytonerpeton microps. These stem tetrapods and amphibians provide evidence for an early split between the two groups, and rapid diversification in the Early Carboniferous.

However, tetrapod material in the earliest stage of the Carboniferous, the Tournaisian, remains scarce relative to fishes in the same habitats, which can appear in large death assemblages, and is unknown until late in the stage. Fish faunas from Tournaisian sites around the world are very alike in composition, containing common and ecologically similar species of ray-finned fishes, rhizodont lobe-finned fishes, acanthodians, sharks, and holocephalans.

Recent analysis of the Blue Beach deposits in Nova Scotia suggest that "the early tetrapod fauna is not easily divisible into Devonian and Carboniferous faunas, suggesting that some tetrapods passed through the end Devonian extinction event unaffected."

In 2025, a study claimed evidence of crown group amniotes during Romer's gap, citing clawed footprints from the Snowy Plains Formation of Victoria, Australia. These footprints, which closely resemble those of sauropsids, suggest that the radiation of crown group amniotes occurred very early in the Carboniferous or even during the Devonian, contrasting with all previous theories that this only occurred during the mid-late Carboniferous. However, a later study noted that Romer's gap tetrapod Westlothiana (once hailed as the earliest reptile, but now considered a stem-tetrapod less closely related to reptiles than modern amphibians are) bore claws, suggesting that claws cannot be considered a distinctive characteristic of amniotes and that their presence in the footprints cannot be used to constrain the timing of origin for Amniota.

== Tournaisian-age locations ==
For many years after Romer's gap was first recognised, only two sites yielding Tournaisian-age tetrapod fossils were known; one is in East Lothian, Scotland, and another in Blue Beach, Nova Scotia, where in 1841, Sir William Logan, the first Director of the Geological Survey of Canada, found footprints from a tetrapod. (Note: During 1841–1842, Scottish geologist Charles Lyell visited North America, including Nova Scotia. In 1843, Lyell mentioned Logan's discovery of footprints in the Carboniferous deposits of Horton Bluff. English paleontologist Richard Owen claimed that Logan's footprints were those of a reptile. See: Lyell, Charles (1843). "On the coal formation of Nova Scotia, and on the age and relative position of the gypsum accompanying marine limestones". Proceedings of the Geological Society of London: 184–186. ; see p. 185. From p. 185: "With these Mr. Lyell found in Horton Bluff scales of a ganoid fish, and in the ripple-marked sandstones of the same place, Mr. Logan discovered footsteps, which appeared to Mr. Owen to belong to some unknown species of reptile, constituting the first indications of the reptilian class known in the carboniferous rocks."; Reprinted in: Lyell, Charles (1843). "On the coal formation of Nova Scotia, and on the age and relative position of the gypsum accompanying marine limestones". American Journal of Science and Arts. 45: 356–358. ; see p. 358.) Blue Beach maintains a fossil museum that displays hundreds of Tournaisian fossils, which continue to be found as the cliff erodes to reveal new fossils.

In 2012, 350-million-year-old tetrapod remains from four new Tournaisian sites in Scotland were announced, including those from a primitive amphibian nicknamed "Ribbo". In 2016, five more species were unearthed from these localities, proving Scotland to be one of the most important sites in the world for understanding this time period.

These localities are the coast of Burnmouth, the banks of the Whiteadder Water near Chirnside, the River Tweed near Coldstream, and the rocks near Tantallon Castle alongside the Firth of Forth. Fossils of both aquatic and terrestrial tetrapods are known from these localities, providing an important record of the transition between life in water and life on land and filling some of the lacunae in Romer's gap. These new localities may represent a larger fauna, as all lie within a short distance of each other and share many fishes with the nearby and contemporary Foulden fish bed locality (which has not produced tetrapods thus far). As with East Kirkton Quarry, tetrapods at these sites were discovered through the long-term efforts of Stan Wood and colleagues.

In April 2013 scientists associated with the British Geological Survey (BGS) and the National Museums of Scotland announced the TW:eed project (Tetrapod World: early evolution and diversification). This project includes collaborators from across the UK, and aims to gather knowledge on the end-Devonian Early-Carboniferous world. One aim has been to drill a continuous 500-meter (1,640 ft) borehole at an undisclosed location near Berwick-upon-Tweed. This has produced a complete, centimetre-scale sampling of Tournaisian sediment, without discontinuities, providing a timeline on which fossil discoveries can be accurately placed. In the most recent paper to be produced by the TW:eed team, they announced some initial results from the core, including the apparent lack of oxygen excursion across Romer's Gap. This suggests that previous theories about low oxygen being the cause of Romer's Gap will need to be re-evaluated.

In 2025, tetrapod footprints were identified from a Tournaisian-age site in Victoria, Australia.

== See also ==
- Arthropod gap
- Olson's gap
- Sauropod hiatus
