= Per E. Ahlberg =

Swedish palaeontologist

Per Erik Ahlberg is a Swedish palaeontologist working with the earliest tetrapods. He took his Ph.D. in zoology at the University of Cambridge in 1989 under English palaeontologist Jenny Clack. He is currently professor at the Department of Organismal Biology, University of Uppsala. He has collaborated with Clack on a number of projects.

He was elected to the Royal Swedish Academy of Sciences early in 2012.
