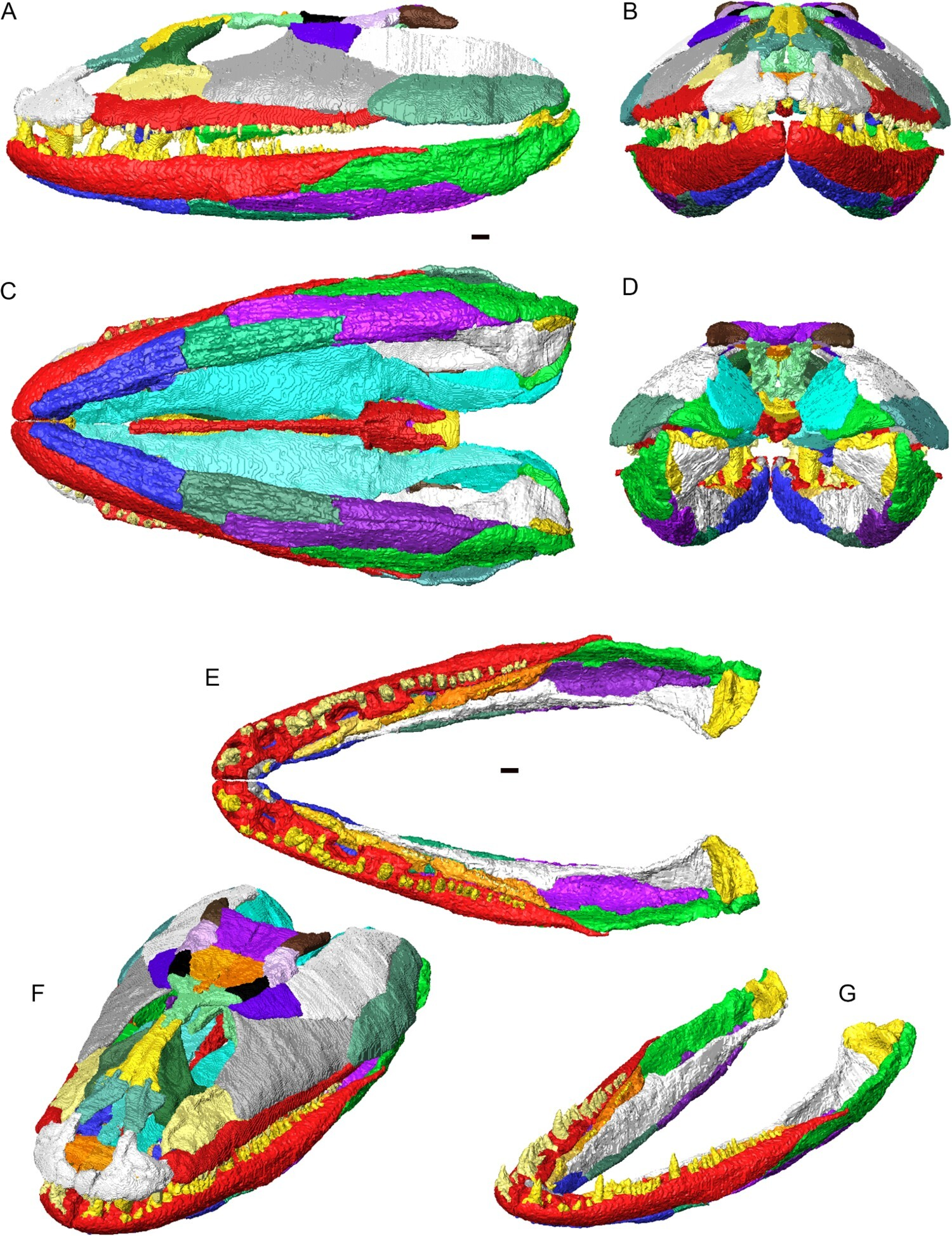
- 3D skull reconstruction

Scientific classification
- Kingdom: Animalia
- Phylum: Chordata
- Clade: Stegocephali
- Family: †Crassigyrinidae von Huene, 1948
- Genus: †Crassigyrinus; Watson, 1929

Type species
- †Crassigyrinus scoticus Watson, 1929

= Crassigyrinus =

Crassigyrinus Temporal range: Viséan ~345–329 Ma

Extinct genus of tetrapodomorphs

Crassigyrinus (from Latin: crassus, 'thick' and Greek: γυρίνος Greek: gyrínos, 'tadpole') is an extinct genus of carnivorous stem tetrapod from the Early Carboniferous Clackmannan Group of Scotland and possibly Greer, West Virginia.

== Discovery ==
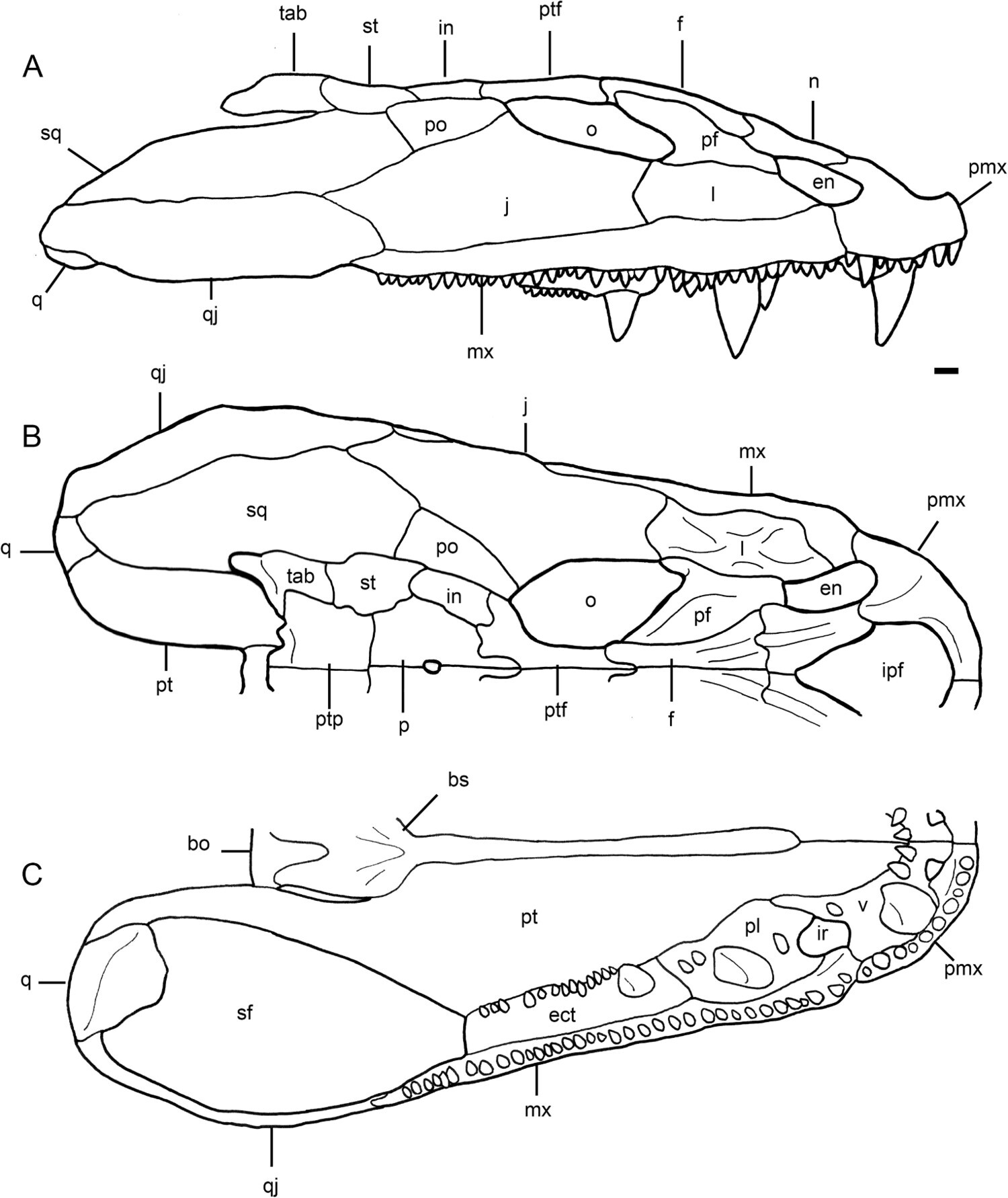
Skull diagram

The type specimen was originally described as Macromerium scoticum and lacked a complete skull. With subsequent discoveries, Crassigyrinus is now known from three skulls, one of which is in articulation with a fairly complete skeleton, and two incomplete lower jaws. Crassigyrinus grew up to 2 metres (6 ft 7 in) in length, coupled with tiny limbs and unusually large jaws. Crassigyrinus is taxonomically enigmatic, having confused paleontologists for decades with its apparent fish-like and tetrapod features. It was traditionally placed within the group Labyrinthodontia along with many other early tetrapods. Some paleontologists have even considered it as the most basal crown group tetrapod, while others hesitate to even place it within the Tetrapoda superclass.

== Description ==
Size comparison

Crassigyrinus had a streamlined body up to 2 metres (6 ft 7 in) in length. Its limbs were tiny and virtually useless, implying that the animal was almost completely aquatic. Crassigyrinus had unusually large jaws, equipped with two rows of sharp teeth, the second row having a pair of palatal fangs. Studies have shown that Crassigyrinus may have been able to open its mouth as wide as 60 degrees, which suggests that it was a powerful predator with a strong bite. This strongly suggests that it was ideally suited for catching fish, and the animal was probably a fast-moving predator.

Several thickened bony ridges ran along the dorsal midline of the snout and between the eyes, and several paleontologists have suggested that they helped the skull to withstand stress when the animal bit prey. Crassigyrinus had large eyes, suggesting that it was either nocturnal, or lived in very murky water. It possessed large otic (spiracular) notches, probably accommodating a spiracle rather than a tympanic membrane.

Life restoration

Its peculiar stunted forelimbs were tiny and the humerus was only 35 millimetres (1.4 in) long in an animal that was about 1.5 metres (4 ft 11 in) long. Various foramina on the humeral surfaces are very similar to those seen in Ichthyostega, Acanthostega, and lobe-finned fishes like Eusthenopteron. The hindlimbs were much larger than the forelimbs, and in the pelvis the ilium lacked a bony connection to the vertebral column (a classic feature of aquatic tetrapods). Although there is evidence that the Crassigyrinus eventually lost its limbs, there is counterevidence in that it used its limbs for movement, as proven by healing in the bones in case of injury. The fact that there is a need to heal the limbs must mean there was an importance of the limbs at some point which then was lost. The tail, only known from a few vertebrae fragments, is assumed to have been long and laterally compressed.

A crushed skull from the Dora bonebed near Cowdenbeath was described by Panchen (1985). The skull was redescribed by Porro et al. (2023), based on a digital reconstruction derived from CT scans. The 1985 reconstruction of the skull was much taller and narrower than in most early tetrapods, though the 2023 reconstruction is relatively low and broad.

== Phylogeny ==
Crassigyrinus is generally placed as a stem-group tetrapod. Cladogram after Pardo, 2024

- Tetrapodomorpha
  - †Eusthenopteron
  - †Panderichthys
  - - †Tiktaalik
    - limbs present
      - †Ymeria
      - †Ventastega
      - †Ichthyostega
      - - †Acanthostega
        - - †Aistopoda
          - †Whatcheeria
          - †Pederpes
          - - †Crassigyrinus
            - - †Greererpeton
              - - †Embolomeri
                - - - †Eucritta
                    - †Baphetes
                  - crown group Tetrapoda
                    - Temnospondyli (including Lissamphibia)
                    - - †Seymouriamorpha (Seymouria)
                      - - †Diadectomorpha (Limnoscelis)
                        - Amniota (including modern mammals, reptiles and birds)

== Paleobiology ==
Crassygyrinus was an aquatic predator. It was capable of opening its jaws widely at a 60-degree angle, with a powerful bite with rapid jaw closure, allowing it to grasp and consume relatively large prey items.
