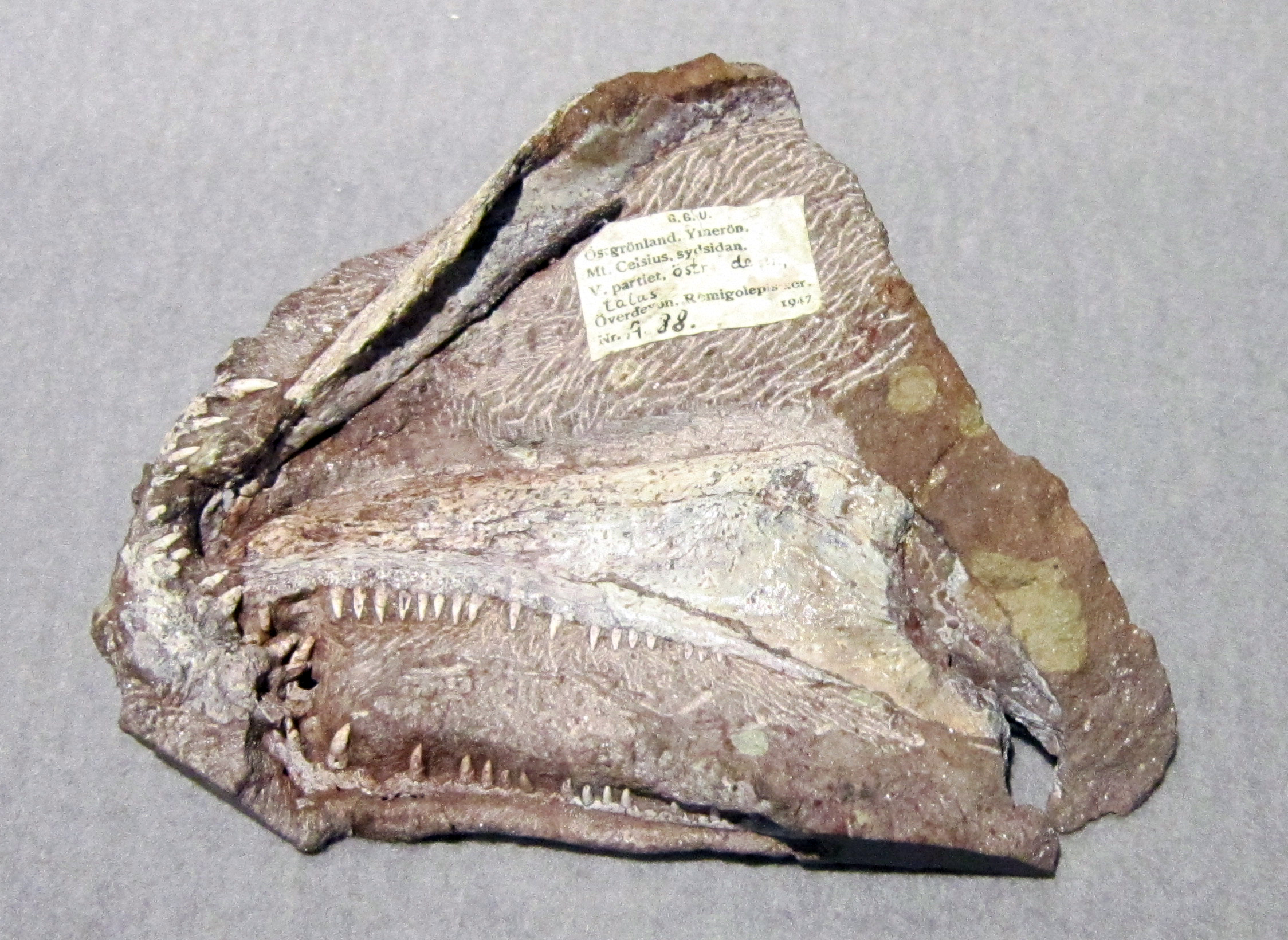
- Holotype specimen, Zoological Museum of Copenhagen

Scientific classification
- Kingdom: Animalia
- Phylum: Chordata
- Clade: Stegocephali
- Genus: †Ymeria; Clack et al., 2012

Type species
- †Ymeria denticulata Clack et al., 2012

= Ymeria =

Ymeria Temporal range: Late Devonian

Extinct genus of tetrapodomorphs

Ymeria is an extinct genus of early stem tetrapod from the Devonian of Greenland. Of the two other genera of stem tetrapods from Greenland, Acanthostega and Ichthyostega, Ymeria is most closely related to Ichthyostega, though the single known specimen is smaller, the skull about 10 cm in length. A single interclavicle resembles that of Ichthyostega, an indication Ymeria may have resembled this genus in the post-cranial skeleton.

== Discovery ==
Ymeria is primarily known from a partial holotype skull including the lower jaws and palate, as well as impressions of the shoulder girdle. The holotype comes from the southern slope of Mt. Celsius on Ymer Island in northeast Greenland. Fossils of Devonian tetrapods like Ichthyostega have been known from Ymer Island since 1929. The skull of Ymeria found in 1947 by a team of paleontologists from Sweden and Denmark. It came from a talus slope or pile of rock fragments at the base of Mount Celsius, encased in a pale red sandstone. The fossil's origin on the mountain has not been identified. There are four formations preserved at Mt. Celsius, all belonging to the larger Celsius Bjerg Group. Since the skull cannot be traced to any one of these formations, its exact age is uncertain.

=== Classification ===
Swedish paleontologist Erik Jarvik, a member of the 1947 expedition, could not assign the skull to either Ichthyostega or Acanthostega. In 1988, English paleontologist Jennifer Clack was the first to propose that the material represented a third type of tetrapod from Greenland, based mainly on the teeth. While the skull shape is closest to Ichthyostega, the teeth are smaller, more numerous and less curved, indicating the two exploited different foods. The surface ornamentation on the skull bones are less pronounced, indicating lighter dermal armour. The material was assigned to a new genus and species, Ymeria denticulata, in 2012. The genus is named after Ymer Island, while the specific name refers to the denticulated or bumpy surface of the lower jaw.

== Description ==
The cranium of the holotype only preserves a few fragmentary bones. The premaxillae (toothed bones at the tip of the snout) were present and seemingly bore indentations at the front for a median rostral. A small bone is preserved behind the right premaxilla. This bone may be a lateral rostral due to possessing a lateral line, but its shape is more similar to a tectal. Rostrals and tectals are small skull bones scattered around the snout, which are present in tetrapodomorph fish but lost in true tetrapods. Both maxillae (toothed bones at the side of the snout) are well-preserved, but not particularly specialized. The premaxillae and maxilla bear numerous tapering teeth, with about 11 on each premaxilla and up to 24 on each maxilla. This is slightly more than Ichthyostega (which has 8–10 on the premaxilla and 16–23 on the maxilla), and Ymeria further differs by having the largest teeth be slightly further forwards in the snout. Bones of the palate (roof of the mouth), such as the vomers, palatines, ectopterygoids, and pterygoids, are poorly preserved, but similar to those of other Devonian stem-tetrapods (in terms of both shape and dentition) when visible. A sliver of bone near the cheek region may represent a branchial element (gill bone). Preserved fragments of the shoulder girdle resemble those of Ichthyostega, such as smooth clavicles and a pointed rear stalk of the interclavicle.

The lower jaws were thick and well-preserved. Their external bone texturing consisted of indistinct and shallow pits and grooves. This contrasts with Ichthyostega and Acanthostega, which have much more pronounced systems of ridges and pits. The jaw also has a (mostly) open lateral line groove on its outer surface. Like other early tetrapods and their close relatives, there were two main rows of teeth on each lower jaw. The outer (marginal) tooth row was present solely on the dentary bone, which was narrow and had alternating regions of light and absent texturing. It had at most 33 teeth, including a symphysial fang (an enlarged tooth near the chin) which was only slightly larger than the other dentary teeth. The inner tooth row stretched along four plate-like bones: the parasymphysial plate and three coronoid bones. The parasymphysial plate has a large tooth at its front edge, followed by a smaller tooth and a diastema (toothless area), similar to Ichthyostega. About 22 teeth were present in a mostly unbroken row along the coronoids. The largest coronoid teeth were present at the front of the first coronoid, the middle of the second, and (to a lesser extent) about a third the way down the rear coronoid. These large teeth are the same size as the dentary teeth. In contrast, even the largest coronoid teeth of Ichthyostega are much smaller than the dentary teeth. Another unique feature of Ymeria is the presence of a large patch of tiny tooth-like denticles on the prearticular bone, which lies directly under the inner main tooth row. This patch of denticles is unknown in Ichthyostega or any of its relatives. All of Ymeria's teeth (on both the top and bottom jaws) were sharp but conical, in contrast to the recurved teeth of Ichthyostega.
