= Aytonerpeton =

Aytonerpeton Temporal range: Early Carboniferous, Tournaisian

Scientific classification
- Domain: Eukaryota
- Kingdom: Animalia
- Phylum: Chordata
- Clade: Sarcopterygii
- Clade: Tetrapodomorpha
- Clade: Stegocephali
- Genus: †Aytonerpeton; Clack et al., 2016

Type species
- †Aytonerpeton microps Clack et al., 2016

Extinct genus of tetrapodomorphs

Aytonerpeton is an extinct genus of stem-tetrapod from the Ballagan Formation of Scotland. It was one of five new genera of early limbed vertebrates from the Ballagan Formation described by Clack et al. in 2016. These vertebrates were among the only known in the world from a period of time known as Romer's gap. Romer's gap, which spans most of the Mississippian age of the Carboniferous, is characterized by a comparative rarity of tetrapod and stem-tetrapod fossils compared to the periods of time directly older and younger than it. However, Aytonerpeton and other Ballagan stem-tetrapods help to close in this gap in the vertebrate fossil record.
