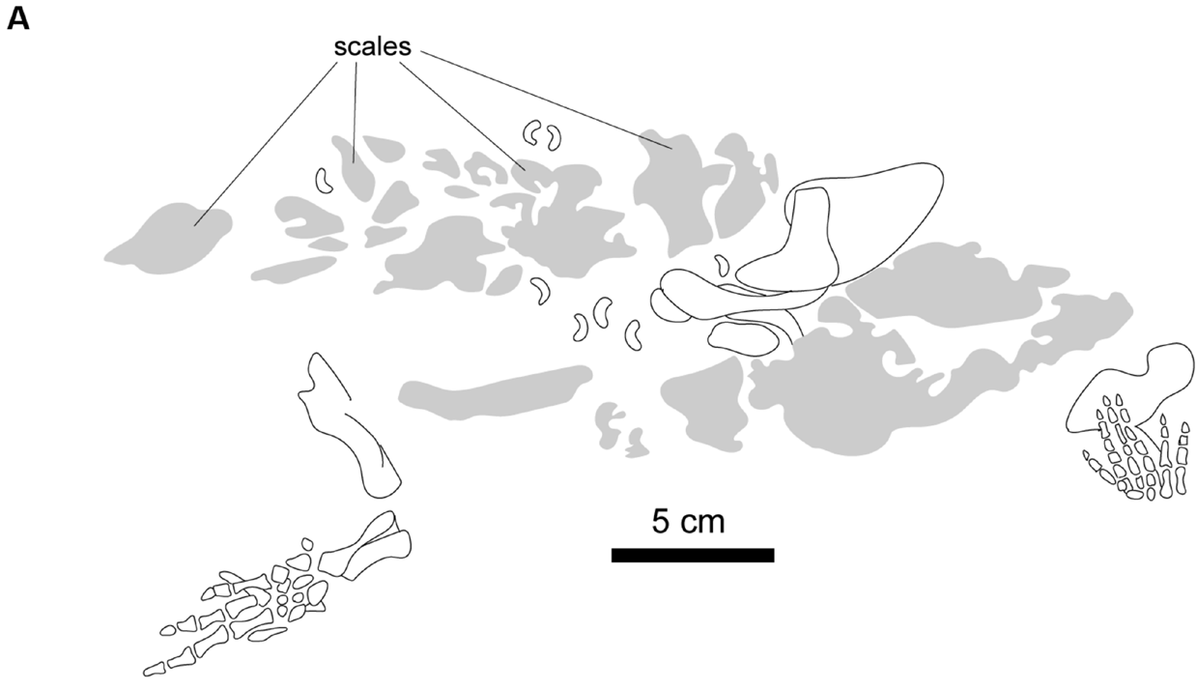
- Fossil diagram

Scientific classification
- Kingdom: Animalia
- Phylum: Chordata
- Clade: Elpistostegalia
- Clade: Stegocephali
- Family: †Tulerpetontidae; Lebedev & Coates, 1995
- Genus: †Tulerpeton; Lebedev, 1984

Type species
- Tulerpeton curtum Lebedev, 1984

= Tulerpeton =

Tulerpeton Temporal range: Famennian

Extinct genus of tetrapodomorphs

Tulerpeton is an extinct genus of Devonian four-limbed vertebrate, known from a fossil that was found in the Tula Region of Russia at a site named Andreyevka. This genus, Acanthostega, and Ichthyostega represent the earliest tetrapods.

== Description ==
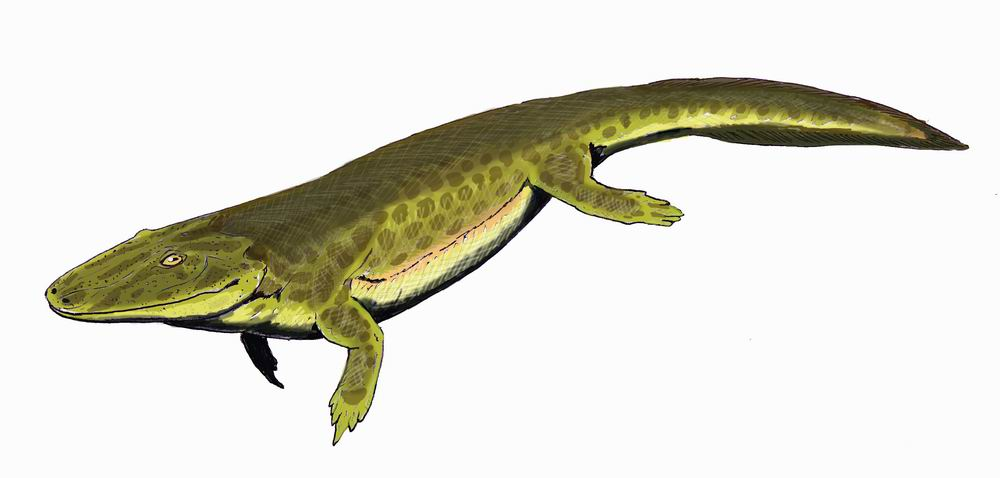
Life restoration

Tulerpeton is considered one of the first "tetrapods" (in the broad sense of the word) to have evolved. It is known from a fragmented skull, the left side of the pectoral girdle, and the entire right forelimb and right hindlimb along with a few belly scales. This species is differentiated from the less derived "aquatic tetrapods" (such as Acanthostega and Ichthyostega) by a strengthened limb structure. These limbs consist of 6 toes and fingers. Additionally, its limbs appear to have evolved for powerful paddling rather than walking.

The fossil fragments also indicate that its head was disconnected from the pectoral girdle. From the absence of the rough postbranchial lamina of the pectoral girdle, it has been determined that Tulerpeton had no gills and was therefore entirely dependent on breathing air.

== Era ==
Tulerpeton lived approximately 365 million years ago, in the Late Devonian period when the climate was fairly warm and there were no glaciers. Land had already been colonized by plants. But it was only during the following Carboniferous period that the first truly terrestrial pentadactyl tetrapods – the ancestors of present-day lissamphibians, mammals, birds, and reptiles – first began to appear.

== Lifestyle ==
Even though Tulerpeton breathed air, it lived mainly in shallow marine water. The Andreyevka fossil bed where it was discovered was at least 200 km from the nearest landmass during this era. The fossils of plants in the area tell us that the salinity of the waters where it lived fluctuated wildly, indicating that the waters were quite shallow.

Because the bones of the neck and the pectoral girdle were disconnected, Tulerpeton could lift its head. Therefore, in shallow water, it had a considerable advantage over the other animals whose heads only moved side to side. The later land animals that descended from Tulerpeton’s relatives needed this head flexion on land, but the condition probably evolved because of the advantage that this gave it in shallow marine waters, not for land. In the book “Vertebrate Life”, authors Pough, Janis, and Heiser say that,” The development of a distinct neck, with the loss of the opercular bones and the later gain of a specialized articulation between the skull and the vertebral column (not yet present in the earliest tetrapods), may be related to lifting the snout out of the water to breath [sic?] air or to snap at prey items.”

The six fingered hands and toes were stronger than the fins from which they developed, therefore Tulerpeton had an advantage in propelling itself through shallow and brackish water, but the limbs do not yet seem strong enough for extensive use on land.

== Significance of the find ==
Tulerpeton is one of the early transition tetrapods – a marine animal capable of living on land. The separation of the pectoral-shoulder girdle from the head allowed the head to move up and down, and the strengthening of the legs and arms allowed the early tetrapods to propel themselves on land.

Tulerpeton is important in the study of dactyly. The polydactyl (more than five toes) condition of Tulerpeton caused considerable comment when the fossil was first discovered. Before the discovery, the pentadactyl five-fingered condition that is ancestral to all living tetrapods, was thought to have developed before the first terrestrial tetrapods appeared. But the discoveries of Acanthostega and Ichthyostega confirm that the pentadactyl ancestor came later in the development of tetrapods.

Phylogenetic studies conducted by Lebedev and Coates (1995) and Coates (1996) indicated that Tulerpeton was the earliest and basalmost member of the clade containing amniotes and all extinct tetrapods that were more closely related to amniotes than to lissamphibians (living amphibians). However, later phylogenetic studies recovered Tulerpeton outside the least inclusive clade containing amniotes and lissamphibians, finding it to be more distantly related to amniotes than such extinct tetrapods as lepospondyls, seymouriamorphs, Embolomeri, temnospondyls, baphetids, colosteids and whatcheeriids were. Michael Benton (2005) noted that, due to the fact that Tulerpeton had more than five toes, establishing its exact phylogenetic position is important to our understanding of digital reduction in tetrapods. If it indeed was more closely related to amniotes than lissamphibians are, it would mean that "reduction to five digits had to happen twice, once on the line to amphibians and once on the reptiliomorph line"; on the other hand, if it lies outside the least inclusive clade containing amniotes and lissamphibians, then "digital reduction happened once, between Tulerpeton and later tetrapods".
