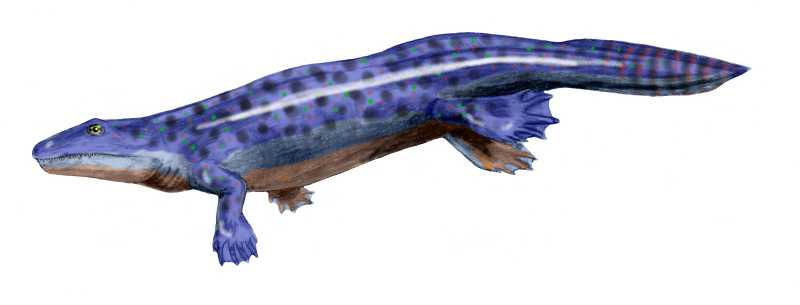
- Ichthyostega, the nominal genus.

Scientific classification (obsolete as paraphyletic)
- Kingdom: Animalia
- Phylum: Chordata
- Clade: Tetrapoda
- Order: †Ichthyostegalia; Säve-Söderbergh, 1932

Genera
- See text

= Ichthyostegalia =

Ichthyostegalia Temporal range: 368–329 Ma Possibly emerged 395 Ma

Paraphyletic group of tetrapodomorphs

Ichthyostegalia is an obsolete order of early amphibians, representing the earliest landliving vertebrates. The group is thus an evolutionary grade rather than a clade. While the group are recognized as having feet rather than fins, most, if not all, had internal gills in adulthood and lived primarily as shallow water fish and spent minimal time on land.

The group evolved from elpistostegalian fish in the late Devonian, or possibly in the middle Devonian. They continued to thrive as denizens of swampland and tidal channels throughout the period. They gave rise to the Temnospondyli and then disappeared during the transition to the Carboniferous.

== Classification ==
- Ichthyostegalia
  - Acanthostegidae
    - Acanthostega
  - Crassigyrinidae
    - Crassigyrinus
  - Densignathidae
    - Densignathus
  - Elginerpetontidae
    - Elginerpeton
    - Obruchevichthys
  - Ichthyostegidae
    - Hynerpeton
    - Ichthyostega
  - Jakubsonidae
    - Jakubsonia
  - Metaxygnathidae
    - Metaxygnathus
  - Sinostegidae
    - Sinostega
  - Tulerpetontidae
    - Tulerpeton
  - Ventastegidae
    - Ventastega
  - Ymeridae
    - Ymeria

== Description ==
As first described, the order's sole member was Ichthyostega, from which the group takes its name. Ichthyostega was seen as transitional between fish and the early Stegocephalians, in that it combines a flat, heavily armoured stegocephalian skull with a fishlike tail bearing fin rays. Later work on Ichthyostega and other Devonian Labyrinthodonts shows that they also had more than 5 digits to each foot, in fact the whole foot being fin-like. Acanthostega, later found in the same locations, appears to have had a soft operculum and both it and Ichthyostega possessed functional internal gills as adults.

The feet are only known from Ichthyostega, Acanthostega, and Tulerpeton, but appear to be polydactyl in all forms with more than the usual five digits for tetrapods and were paddle-like. The tail bore true fin rays like those found in fish.

The ichthyostegalians were large to medium-sized, with an adult size form most genera on the order of a meter or more. Their heads were flat and massive, with a host of labyrinthodont teeth. They were carnivorous and probably mainly ate fish, but may also have fed on washed-up carcasses of fish and other marine life, and hunted unwary arthropods and other invertebrate life along the tidal channels of the coal swamps. The vertebrae were complex and rather weak. At the close of the Devonian, forms with progressively stronger legs and vertebrae evolved, and the later groups lacked functional gills as adults. As adults, the animals would have been heavy and clumsy on land, and would probably appear more as fish that occasionally went ashore rather than proper land animals. All were however predominately aquatic and some spent all or nearly all their lives in water.

== Genera ==
The order Ichthyostegalia was erected for Ichthyostega, and contained until the 1980s only three genera (Ichthyostega, Acanthostega and Tulerpeton). While "Ichthyostegalia" in principle contain the most basal of animals with toes rather than fins, Clack and Ahlberg uses it for all finds more advanced than Tiktaalik (the closest relative of tetrapods known to have retained paired fins rather than feet). Under this use, the number of known Devonian tetrapods have increased dramatically, so that the group now contain 12 genera: Most of the newer finds are redescriptions of very fragmentary finds, usually just the lower jaw. These were thought to have been from fish when found, but cladistic analyses indicate they are more advanced than Tiktaalik, though whether they actually had feet rather than fins is unknown. In order of discovery:

- Ichthyostega
- Acanthostega
- Tulerpeton
- Metaxygnathus
- Elginerpeton
- Obruchevichthys
- Ventastega
- Hynerpeton
- Densignathus
- Sinostega
- Jakubsonia
- Ymeria

== Phylogeny ==
Cladogram after Pardo, 2024:

- Tetrapodomorpha
  - †Eusthenopteron
  - †Panderichthys
  - - †Tiktaalik
    - limbs present
      - †Ymeria
      - †Ventastega
      - †Ichthyostega
      - - †Acanthostega
        - - †Aistopoda
          - †Whatcheeria
          - †Pederpes
          - - †Crassigyrinus
            - - †Greererpeton
              - - †Embolomeri
                - - - †Eucritta
                    - †Baphetes
                  - crown group Tetrapoda
                    - Temnospondyli (including Lissamphibia)
                    - - †Seymouriamorpha (Seymouria)
                      - - †Diadectomorpha (Limnoscelis)
                        - Amniota (including modern mammals, reptiles and birds)
