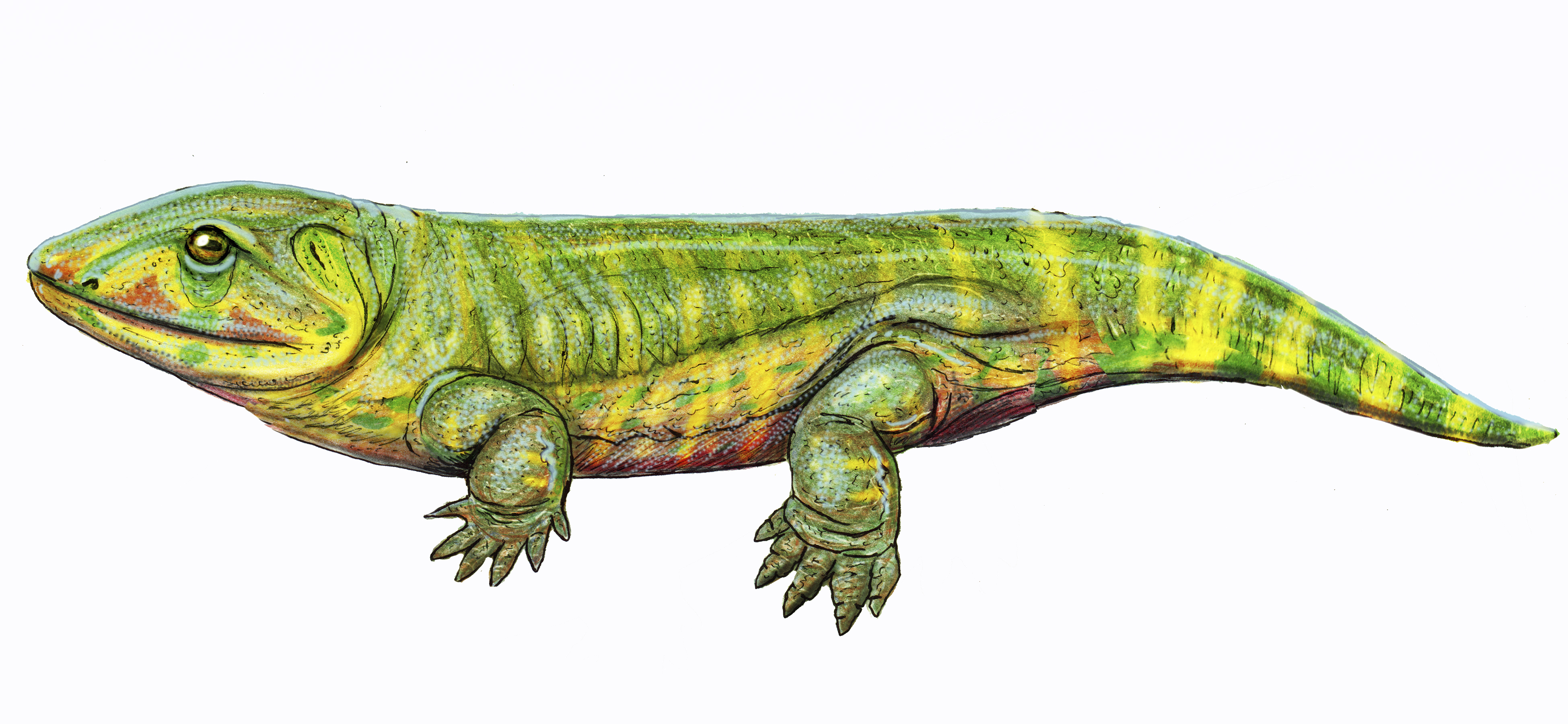
- Pederpes finneyae

Scientific classification
- Kingdom: Animalia
- Phylum: Chordata
- Clade: Stegocephali
- Family: †Whatcheeriidae; Clack, 2002

Type genus
- †Whatcheeria Lombard and Bolt, 1995

Genera
- ?Ossinodus; Pederpes; Whatcheeria

= Whatcheeriidae =

Whatcheeriidae Temporal range: 358.9–330.9 Ma Early Carboniferous

Extinct family of tetrapodomorphs

Whatcheeriidae is an extinct family of stem-tetrapods which lived in the Mississippian sub-period, a subdivision of the Carboniferous period. It contains the genera Pederpes, Whatcheeria, and possibly Ossinodus. Fossils of a possible whatcheeriid have been found from the Red Hill locality of Pennsylvania. If these remains are from a whatcheeriid, they extend the range of the family into the Late Devonian and suggest that advanced tetrapods may have lived alongside primitive tetrapod ancestors like Hynerpeton and Densignathus. They also imply that a very long ghost lineage of whatcheeriids lived through Romer's gap, a period during the Early Carboniferous conspicuously lacking in tetrapod remains.

== Classification ==
Currently, using modern cladistic taxonomy, Whatcheeriidae is not placed in Amphibia or any other class but simply as its own family within stem-group tetrapods. The analysis below was conducted by Swartz in 2012, showing the relationship of whatcheeriids with other stem-tetrapods.

- Elpistostegalia
  - Panderichthys
  - Stegocephalia
    - - Tiktaalik
      - Elpistostege
    - - Elginerpeton
      - - Ventastega
        - - Acanthostega
          - - Ichthyostega
            - - Whatcheeriidae
              - - Colosteidae
                - - Crassigyrinus
                  - - Baphetidae
                    - Crown group Tetrapoda
