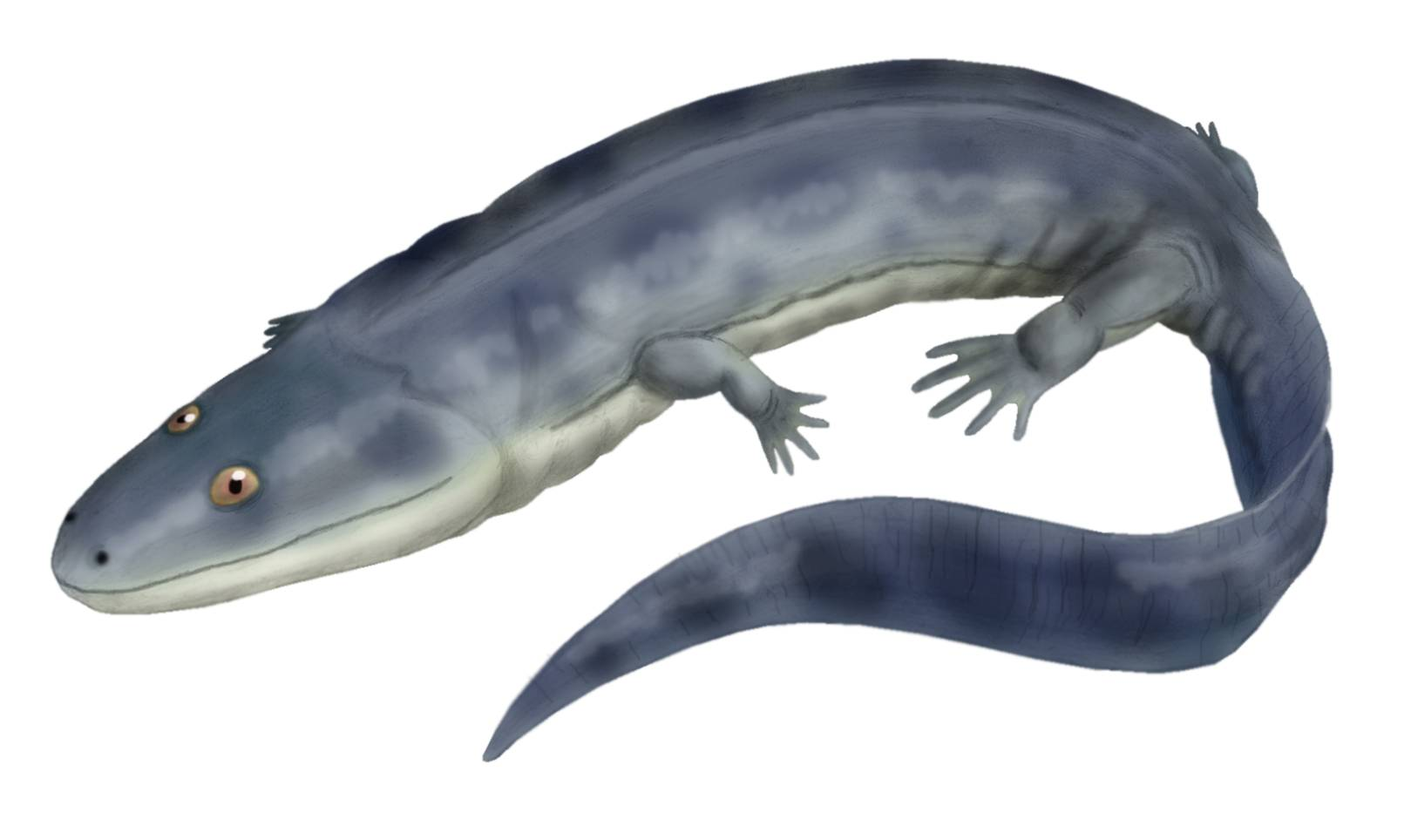

Scientific classification
- Kingdom: Animalia
- Phylum: Chordata
- Family: †Whatcheeriidae
- Genus: †Ossinodus; Warren & Turner, 2004

Type species
- Ossinodus pueri Warren & Turner, 2004

= Ossinodus =

Ossinodus Temporal range: Early Carboniferous, 345.3–326.4 Ma

Genus of the first four-limbed vertebrates and their descendants

Ossinodus is an extinct genus of stem tetrapod. Fossils have been found from the Ducabrook Formation in Queensland, Australia dating back to the middle Visean stage of the Early Carboniferous (Mississippian). It was originally placed within the family Whatcheeriidae, but the absence of an intertemporal bone as suggested by a recent reconstruction of the skull based on fragmentary material may prove it to be stemward of all whatcheeriids.

The oldest known pathological bone of a stegocephalian, a fractured right radius, has been referred to Ossinodus.

== History and discovery ==
Ossinodus is one of the first large stegocephalians discovered during the time known as Romer's Gap. In 1996, initial inspection of scraps and materials postulated three possible types of tetrapods. A premaxilla with a tusk was originally attributed to a colosteid, then an ilium with a postiliac process linked it to an anthracosaur, or possibly a temnospondyl. Described by Turner and Warren, all Ossinodus bones were discovered together at one site, ranging in all sizes. The recovered remains were deemed to belong in the same group O. pueri due to common ornamentation on the dermal cranial bones. The specimens were found at the Drummond Basin of Queensland, Australia, in the Middle Paddock site of the Duckabrook Formation.

Estimated to be about 333 million years old, the Middle Paddock site is representative of "a shallow fluviatile or lacustrine environment," which is a large body of water with sedimentary deposits made of slits, clays, and carbonates. The tetrapodal remains found here date back to Late Visean (early Carboniferous), towards the end of Romer's Gap - a gap in the tetrapod fossil record. The excavation began in 1996 and ended in 2004, concluding with an extensive collection dis-articulated bones as well as half a skull. The remains found during the time period are significant in suggesting that terrestrial tetrapods first inhabited Gondwana, and were not of small European forms.

According to Warren, there were at least five specimens collected at the site, ranging in all sizes. The diversity of sizes indicated that the collection consisted of adults as well as juveniles.

== Description ==
Ossinodus are comparable in mass to modern Chinese giant salamanders. Compared to many other tetrapods of the late Devonian, it was estimated that they were 1–2 meters in length. Dentition and habitat suggests that Ossinodus' were piscivores considering habitat and teeth shape.

=== Skull ===
Ossinodus skulls are broad and heavily ornamented. Ornamentations include deep pits and ridges all over the skull, on the parietal bones around a raised parietal foramen, as well as the jaw. The pits found on the maxilla and premaxilla are smaller and finer than those found on the skull table. Ossinodus differ from sister taxon Pederpes and Whatcheeria as their pits are larger than the pits on Pederpes, with Whatcheeriidae mostly lacking dermal pitting.

On the outer surface of the skull, there is no apparent external sensory sulci. But upon closer inspection, the sensory canal is enclosed in the quadratojugal and only visible posteriorly along the inner surface. The choana is seen on the anterior inner surface of the maxilla. Orbits are small and placed anteriorly. Nostrils are located fairly low on the lateral side of the skull.

The presence of an elongate supratemporal-postparietal contact played a role in eliminating anthracosaur as a possibility. As shared with other tetrapods, Ossinodus tabulars protrude slightly posteriorly and are also quite short. Sutures between the tabular-supraorbital area and squamosal suggest some motility to the posterior cheek.

=== Dentition ===
Ossinodus have around 34 teeth along the maxilla as well as an inner row of teeth found on the palatine, vomer, and ectopterygoid. The maxillary fangs are the largest teeth for Ossinodus. The teeth are distally-keeled in the shape of the head of a lance and contain grooves indicative of dentine infolds. From the broken tooth, the tooth were polyplocodont - free of a pulp cavity with "ortho-dentine" folded simply and irregularly to the first degree. Ossinodus teeth are also characterized as having dark dentine along the first fold.

=== Postcranial skeleton ===
Most of the postcranial skeleton, other than the neural arches, are smaller compared to the skull.

Some postcranial skeletal elements like the interclavicle, cleithrum, and scapulocoracoid resemble those found of genera Whatcheeriidae. Cladistically, this groups Ossinodus with Whatcheeria and Pederpes. The clavicle and interclavicle are also ornamented with deep pits, the same kind of ornamentation that decorates the dermal cranial bones. Similar to Ichthyostega and other tetrapods, their neural spines are "squared-off dorsally" with the anterior and posterior margins of the lateral faces of the intercentrum rolled outwards and enlarged pleurocentrum. Their neural spines stand upright and the prezygapophysis are shorter than their postzygapophysis.

Like most primitive stegocephalians, the abductor blades of the femur protrude distally, with a groove separating it from the femoral head. Length and thickness depend on the size of the creature. Their tibias are broad, flat, and less waisted. The humerus is covered by numerous asymmetrical pits.

The most famous Ossinodus bone is the fractured radius. Along the edge of the extensor and flexor surfaces, there are prominent ridges that are found in early tetrapods. Likewise with Acanthostega, Pederpes, and Ichthyostega, the radii are shorter and less waisted.

The ornamentation and pits found on specimen bones are sites of individual muscle attachment.

== Paleobiology ==
=== Paleopathology ===
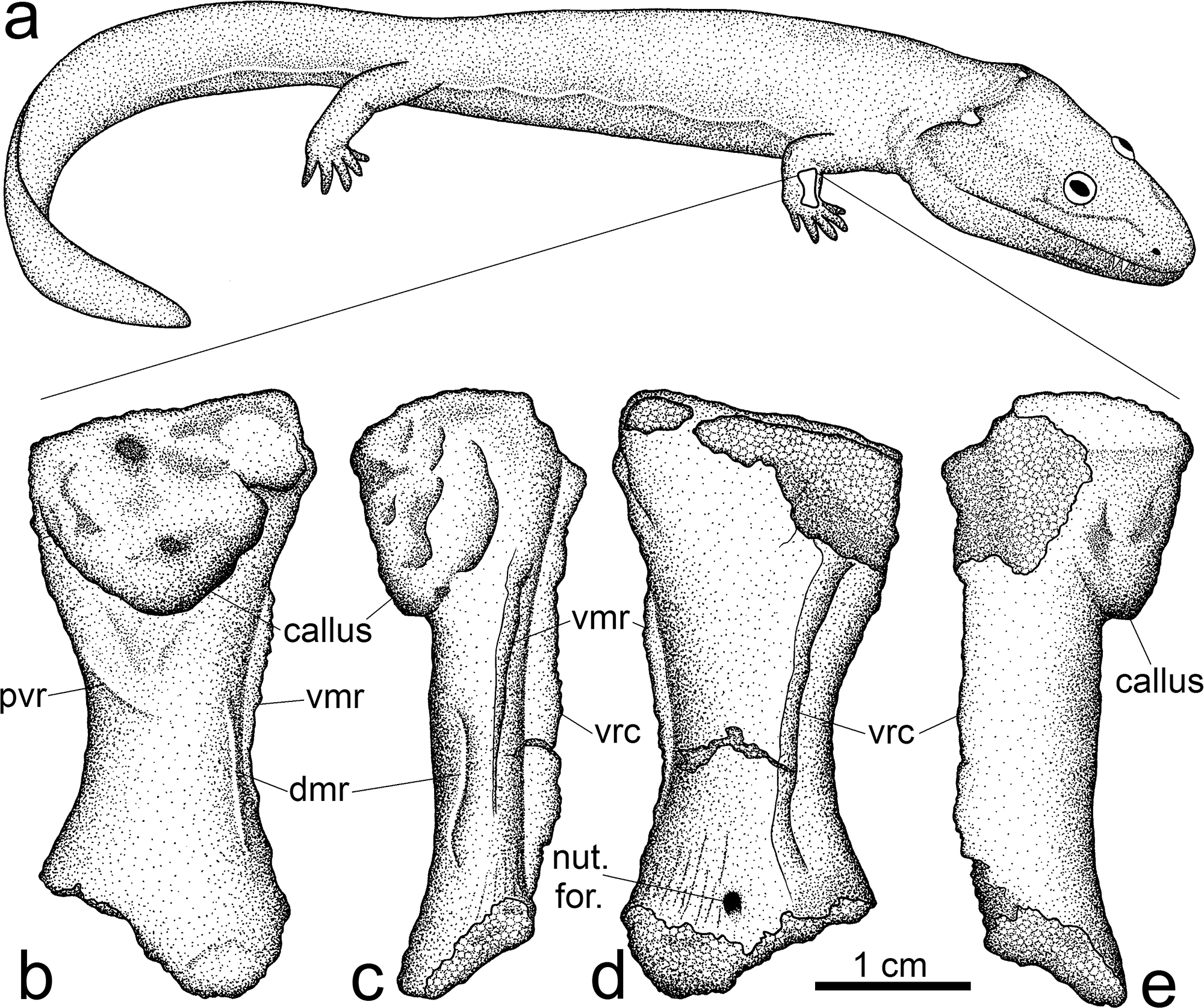
Restoration showing placement of a fractured right radius

There is a fractured right radius of a particular specimen that shines light onto early tetrapod habitualization. A broken radius found among the Ossinodus remains in Australia suggests they must have spent a significant portion of their time on land. Through finite force analysis, the amount of force necessary to acquire the damage found on the bone is only possible from a fall of a certain height. It is unsure if Ossinodus were mainly aquatic or terrestrial, but it is safe to say that they spent time both in water and on land.

Ossification along the fracture point marks one of the earliest signs of bone healing in early tetrapods. The healing process produced a callus near the proximal end.

=== Habitat ===
Early tetrapods were known to spend most of their time in water, often with just their heads poking out. Analysis through CT scan, however, shows that the "axis of trabecular alignment" on the fractured radius lies almost parallel to the bone's long axis, which suggests that the radius was constantly remodeling in response to supporting a heavy load. The only possible way for the radius to be under constant stress would be if the creature spent a considerable amount of time on land. There are two specimens whose hind-limbs suggest aquatic locomotion, so Ossinodus could represent a pivotal transitional species. A small Ossinodus femur recovered, postulated to belong to a juvenile and compared to the Horton Bluff femur, suggests younger specimens were more aquatic than older specimens.

In addition to the fractured radius, the enclosed sensory canal synapomorphy is also indicative of tetrapods moving away from aquatic perceptions. These events are significant in understanding the water-to-land transition.

== Paleoenvironment ==
The Middle Paddock site, where the Ossinodus specimen were collected, is organized as a "progradational deltaic system," meaning that there is an upper layer with sedimentary patterns exhibiting cyclic flood plains, encompassing a fluvial environment. The lower layer contains alternating layers of wave-influenced siltstone, sandstone, and limestone.

Uncovered at the site were also various aquatic fossils, again further suggesting that this early tetrapod coexisted with aquatic species. The aquatic fauna that was recovered at the site includes lungfish and sharks.

== Classification ==
The closest relatives of Ossinodus are Whatcheeria and Pederpes. This relationship is determined through similarities in postcranial skeletal synapomorphies. However, Ossinodus separates itself from the two based on the size discrepancy between the skull bones and the limbs. While similar in skeletal features, an adult Ossinodus was typically larger than a full grown Whatcheeria or Pederpes.

The skull of Ossinodus is broader, shallow, and more elongated than Whatcheeria skulls, as Whatcheeria skulls have more depth due to their jugal notch. The ornamentations decorated throughout the dermal cranial and skeletal bones are more apparent and take up more surfaces in Ossinodus than the other two taxa.

There is strong support for Ossinodus being grouped together with Whatcheeria and Pederpes, as phylogenetic trees have been generated that consistently place them as a trichotomy. There is debate about whether Ossinodus is a sister taxon to Whatcheeria and Pederpes or if Ossinodus is perhaps the stem of the two other taxa. Based on the descriptions provided by Warren and Turner, Ossinodus display more primitive features than Whatcheeria and Pederpes and thus could possibly be a sister taxon, older than the later two.
