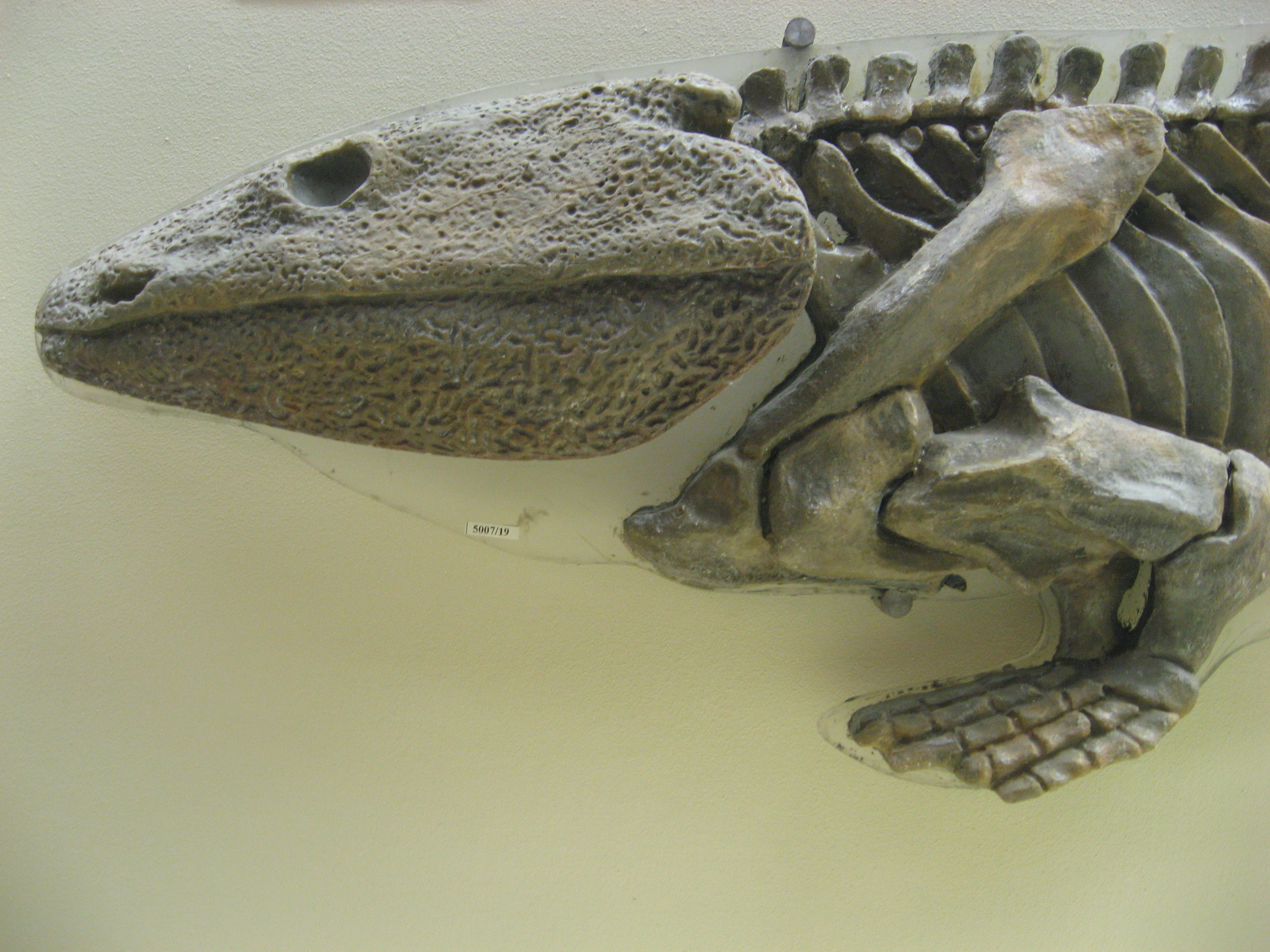
- Reconstructed front of skeleton in Moscow Paleontological Museum
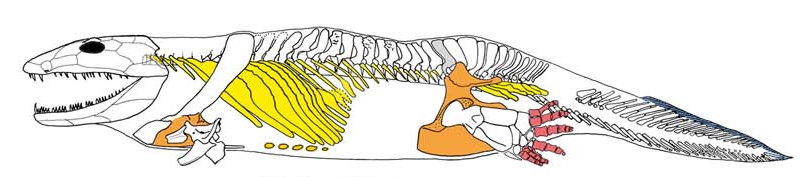
- Skeletal diagram

Scientific classification
- Kingdom: Animalia
- Phylum: Chordata
- Clade: Stegocephali
- Family: †Ichthyostegidae; Säve-Söderbergh, 1932
- Genus: †Ichthyostega; Säve-Söderbergh, 1932

Type species
- †Ichthyostega stensioei Säve-Söderbergh, 1932

Other species
- †I. eigili Säve-Söderbergh, 1932; †I. kochi? Säve-Söderbergh, 1932; †I. watsoni Säve-Söderbergh, 1932

Synonyms
- Genus synonymy: Ichthyostegopsis Säve-Söderbergh, 1932; Species synonymy: Ichthyostega stensiöi Säve-Söderbergh, 1932; Ichthyostegopsis wimani Säve-Söderbergh, 1932

= Ichthyostega =

Ichthyostega Temporal range: Late Devonian (Famennian), 365–360 Ma

Extinct genus of tetrapodomorphs

Ichthyostega, from Ancient Greek ἰχθύς (ikthús), meaning "fish", and στέγη (stégē), meaning "roof", is an extinct genus of limbed tetrapodomorphs from the Late Devonian of what is now Greenland. It was among the earliest four-limbed vertebrates ever in the fossil record and was one of the first with weight-bearing adaptations for terrestrial locomotion. Ichthyostega possessed lungs and limbs that helped it navigate through shallow water in swamps. Although Ichthyostega is often labelled a 'tetrapod' because of its limbs and fingers, it evolved long before true crown group tetrapods and could more accurately be referred to as a stegocephalian or stem tetrapod. Likewise, while undoubtedly of amphibian build and habit, it is not a true member of the group in the narrow sense, as the first modern amphibians (members of the group Lissamphibia) appeared in the Triassic Period. Until finds of other early stegocephalians and closely related fishes in the late 20th century, Ichthyostega stood alone as a transitional fossil between fish and tetrapods, combining fish and tetrapod features. Newer research has shown that it had an unusual anatomy, functioning more akin to a seal than a salamander, as previously assumed.

== History ==
In 1932 Gunnar Säve-Söderbergh described four Ichthyostega species from the Late Devonian of East Greenland and one species belonging to the genus Ichthyostegopsis, I. wimani. These species could be synonymous (in which case only I. stensioei would remain), because their morphological differences are not very pronounced. The species differ in skull proportions, skull punctuation, and skull bone patterns. The comparisons were done on 14 specimens collected in 1931 by the Danish East Greenland Expedition. Additional specimens were collected between 1933 and 1955.

== Description ==
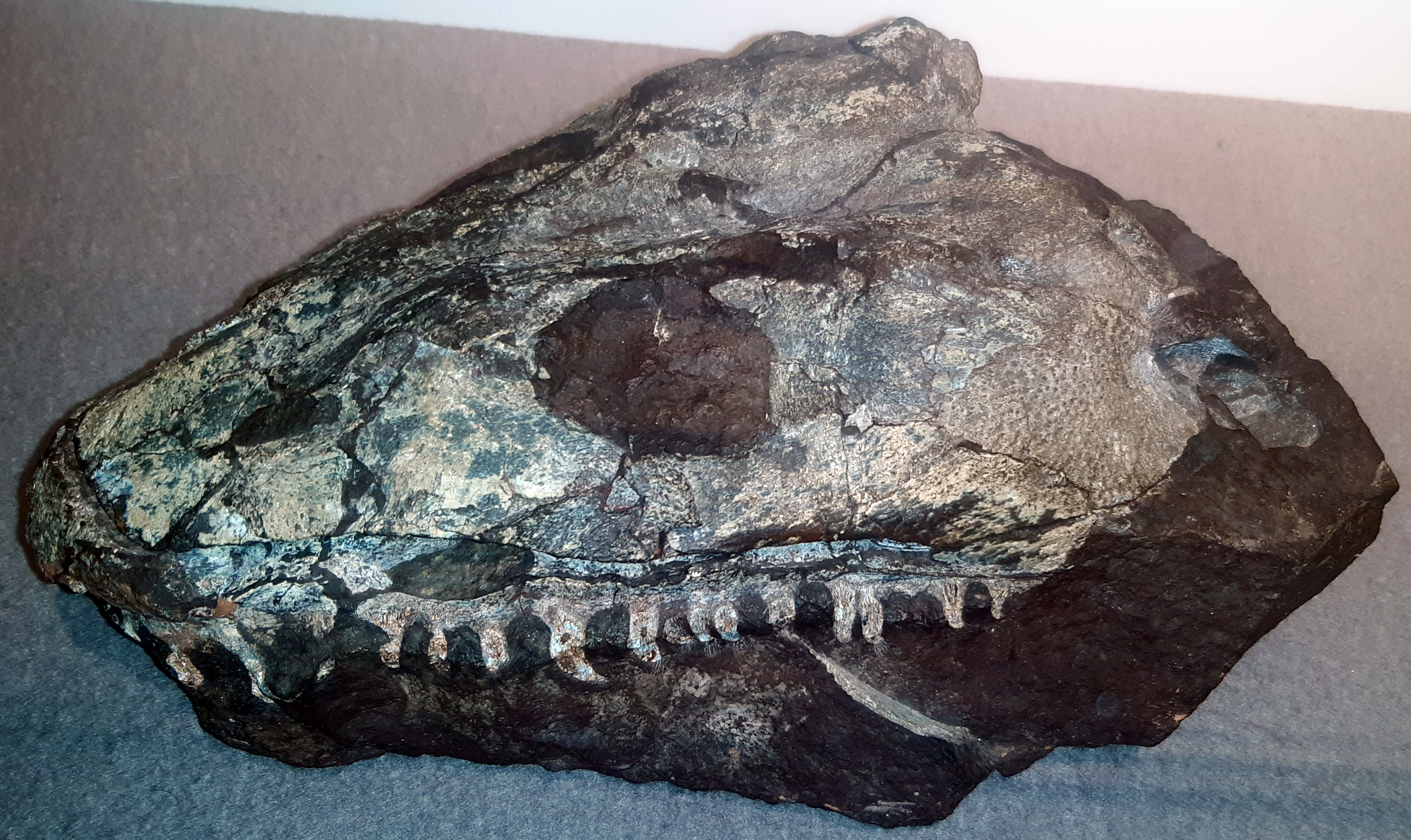
Skull A.199, Zoological Museum of Copenhagen

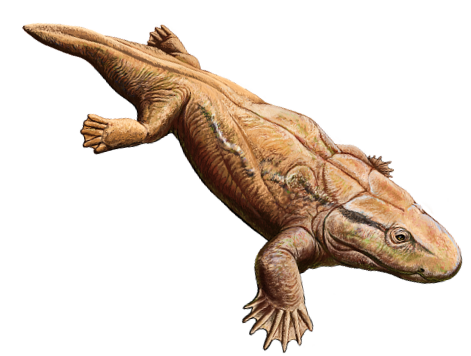
Life restoration

Size of Ichthyostega and its relative Acanthostega compared to a human

Ichthyostega was a fairly large animal for its time, as it was broadly built and about 1.5 m (4 ft 11 in) long. The skull was low, with dorsally placed eyes and large labyrinthodont teeth. The posterior margin of the skull formed an operculum covering the gills. The spiracle was situated in an otic notch behind each eye. Computed tomography has revealed that Ichthyostega had a specialized ear, including a stapes with a unique morphology compared to other tetrapods or to any fish hyomandibula.

=== Postcranial skeleton ===
The legs were large compared to contemporary relatives. It had seven digits on each hind leg, along with a peculiar, poorly ossified mass that lies anteriorly adjacent to the digits. The exact number of digits on the forelimb is not yet known, since fossils of the hand have not been found. While in water, the foot would have functioned like a fleshy paddle more than a fin.

The vertebral column and ribcage of Ichthyostega were unusual and highly specialized relative to both its contemporaries and later tetrapods. The thoracic vertebrae at the front of the trunk and the short neck have tall neural spines that lean backwards. They attach to pointed ribs which increase in size and acquire prominent overlapping flanges. Past the sixth or seventh flanged rib, the ribs abruptly decrease in size and lose their flanges. The lumbar vertebrae at the back of the trunk have strong muscle scars and neural spines which are bent forwards and decrease in size towards the hips. The sacral vertebrae above the hips have fan-shaped neural spines that transition from forward-leaning to backward-leaning as they approach the tail. The vertebrae right behind the hips have unusually large ribs similar to those of the thoracic region. The caudal vertebrae have slender spines that lean backwards. The tail of Ichthyostega retained a low fin supported by bony lepidotrichia (fin ray). The tail fin was not as deep as in Acanthostega, and would have been less useful for swimming.

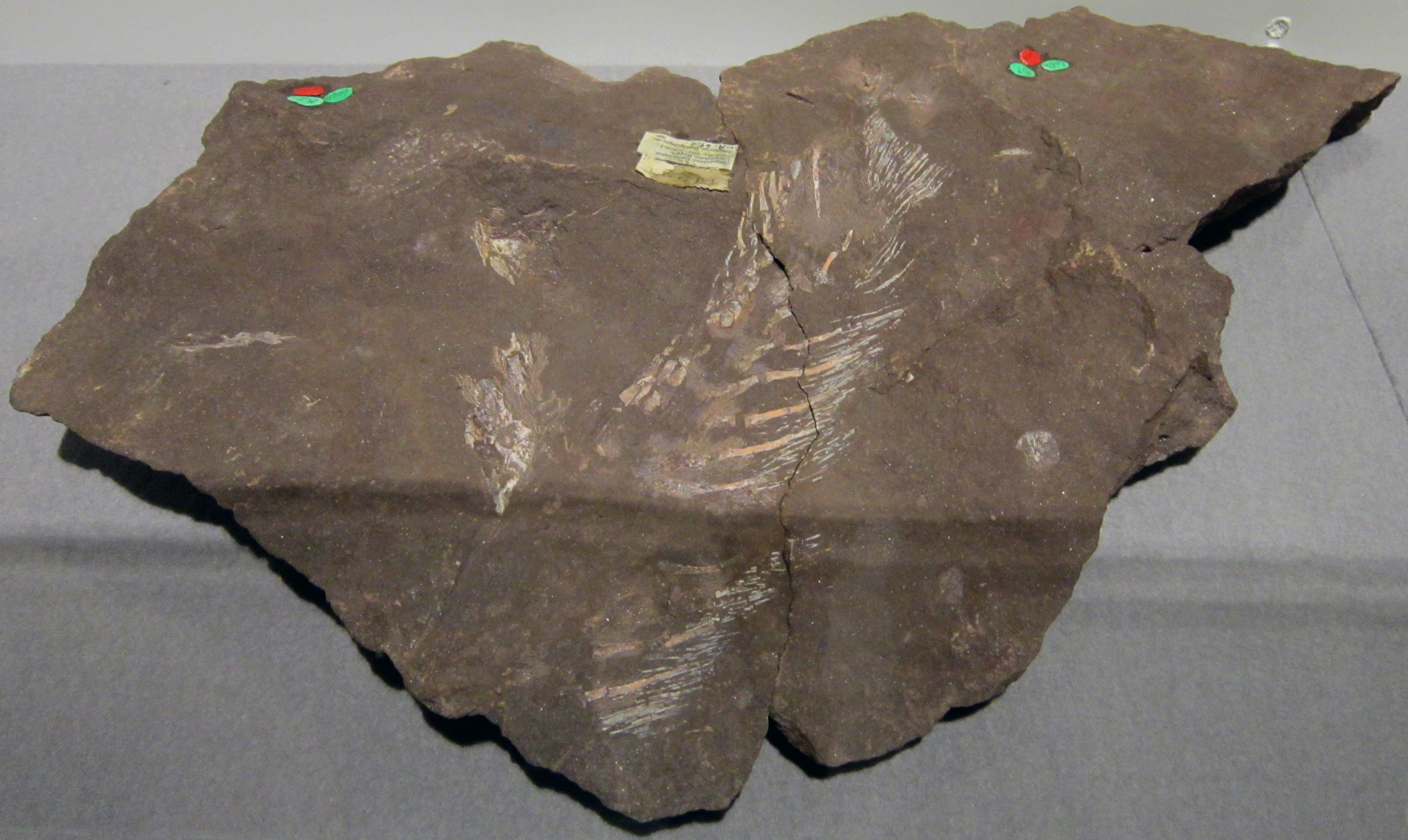
Tail with fin rays, counterpart of specimen A.69

Ichthyostega is related to Acanthostega, which is also from what is now East Greenland. The skull seems more fish-like than Acanthostega, but the pelvic girdle morphology seems stronger and better adapted to life on land. Ichthyostega also had more supportive ribs and stronger vertebrae with more developed zygapophyses. Whether these traits were independently evolved in Ichthyostega is debated. It does, however, show Ichthyostega may have ventured onto land on occasion, unlike contemporaneous limbed vertebrates, such as Elginerpeton and Obruchevichthys.

== Classification ==
Traditionally, Ichthyostega was considered part of an order named for it, the "Ichthyostegalia". However, this group represents a paraphyletic grade of primitive stem-tetrapods and is not used by many modern researchers. Phylogenetic analysis has shown Ichthyostega is intermediate between other primitive stegocephalian stem-tetrapods. The evolutionary tree of early stegocephalians below follows the results of one such analysis performed by Swartz in 2012.

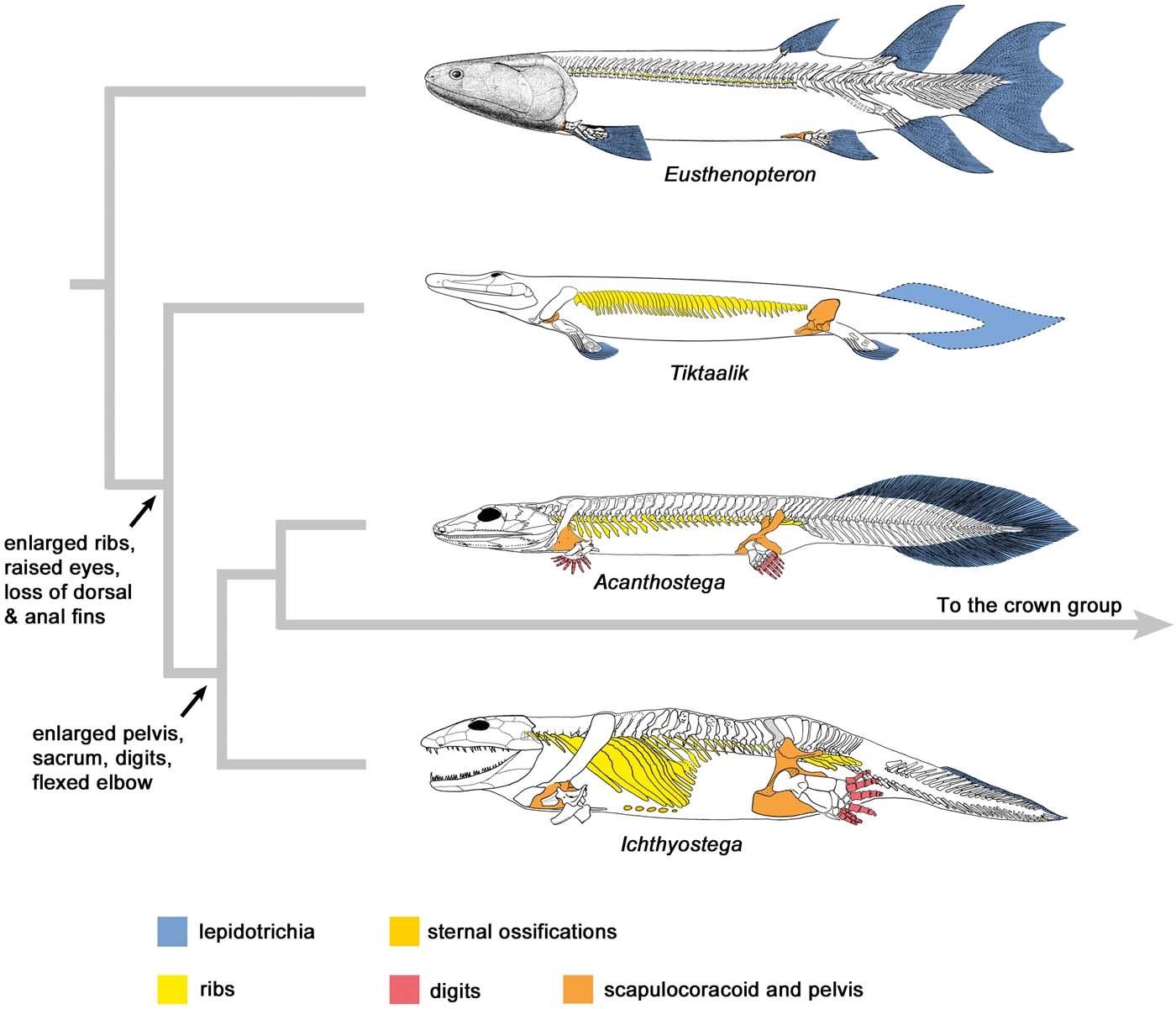
Simplified phylogeny of the fish–tetrapod transition.

- Elpistostegalia
  - Panderichthys
  - - - Tiktaalik
      - Elpistostege
    - Stegocephali
      - Elginerpeton
      - - Ventastega
        - - Acanthostega
          - - Ichthyostega
            - - Whatcheeriidae
              - - Colosteidae
                - - Crassigyrinus
                  - - Baphetidae
                    - Crown group Tetrapoda

Cladogram after Pardo, 2024

- Tetrapodomorpha
  - †Eusthenopteron
  - †Panderichthys
  - - †Tiktaalik
    - limbs present
      - †Ymeria
      - †Ventastega
      - †Ichthyostega
      - - †Acanthostega
        - - †Aistopoda
          - †Whatcheeria
          - †Pederpes
          - - †Crassigyrinus
            - - †Greererpeton
              - - †Embolomeri
                - - - †Eucritta
                    - †Baphetes
                  - crown group Tetrapoda
                    - Temnospondyli (including Lissamphibia)
                    - - †Seymouriamorpha (Seymouria)
                      - - †Diadectomorpha (Limnoscelis)
                        - Amniota (including modern mammals, reptiles and birds)

== Paleobiology ==
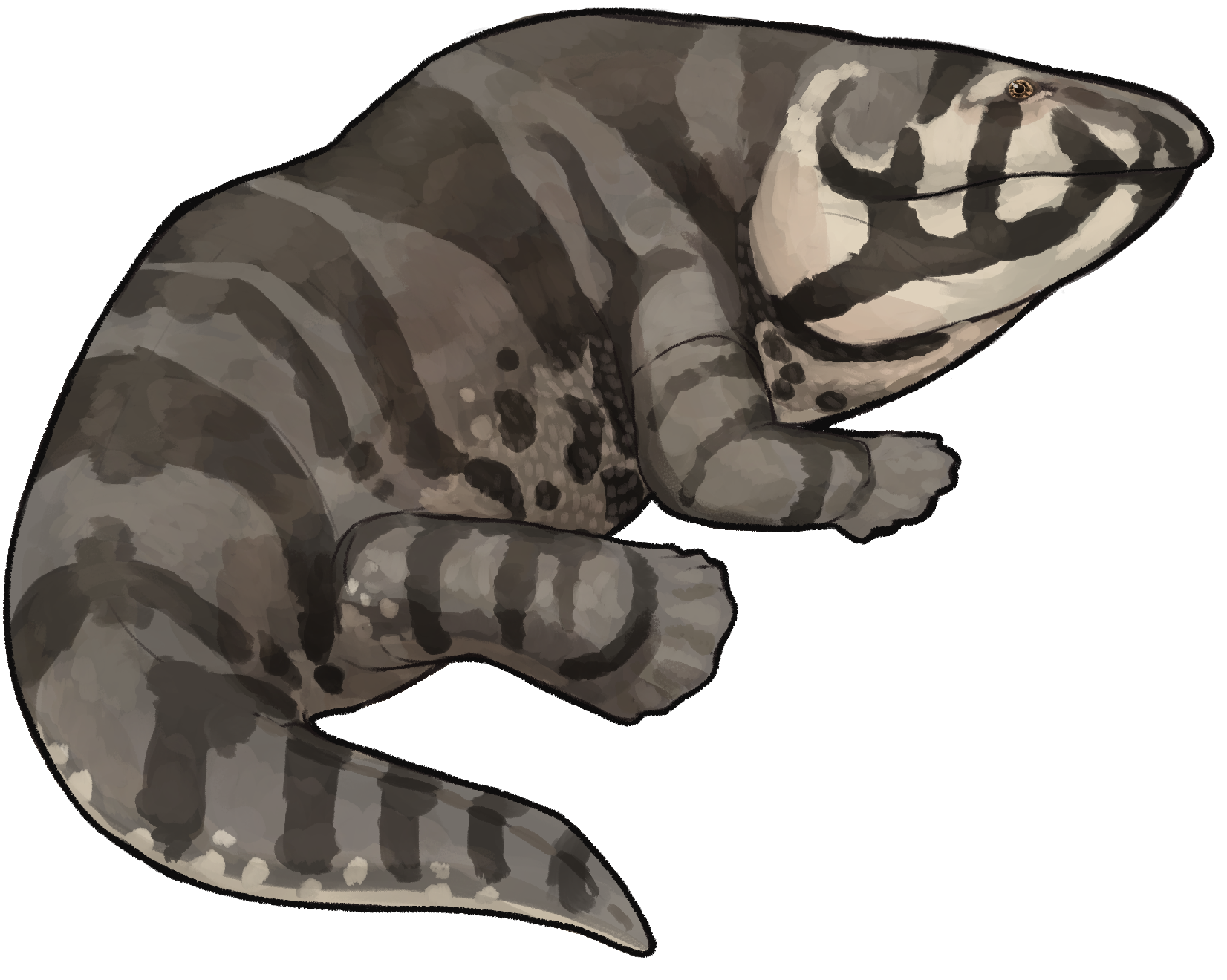
Life restoration.

Early limbed vertebrates like Ichthyostega and Acanthostega differed from earlier tetrapodomorphs such as Eusthenopteron or Panderichthys in their increased adaptations for life on land. Though tetrapodomorphs possessed lungs, they used gills as their primary means of discharging carbon dioxide. Tetrapodomorphs used their bodies and tails for locomotion and their fins for steering and braking; Ichthyostega may have used its forelimbs for locomotion on land and its tail for swimming.

Its massive ribcage was made up of overlapping ribs and the animal possessed a stronger skeletal structure, a largely fishlike spine, and forelimbs apparently powerful enough to pull the body from the water. These anatomical modifications may have been a result of selection to overcome the lack of buoyancy experienced on land. The hindlimbs were smaller than the forelimbs and unlikely to have borne full weight in an adult, while the broad, overlapping ribs would have inhibited side-to-side movements. The forelimbs had the required range of movement to push the body up and forward, probably allowing the animal to drag itself across flat land by synchronous (rather than alternate) "crutching" movements, much like that of a mudskipper or a seal. It was incapable of typical quadrupedal gaits as the forelimbs lacked the necessary rotary motion range.

== See also ==
- Evolutionary history of life
- Hynerpeton
- List of transitional fossils
- List of prehistoric amphibians
- Ymeria
