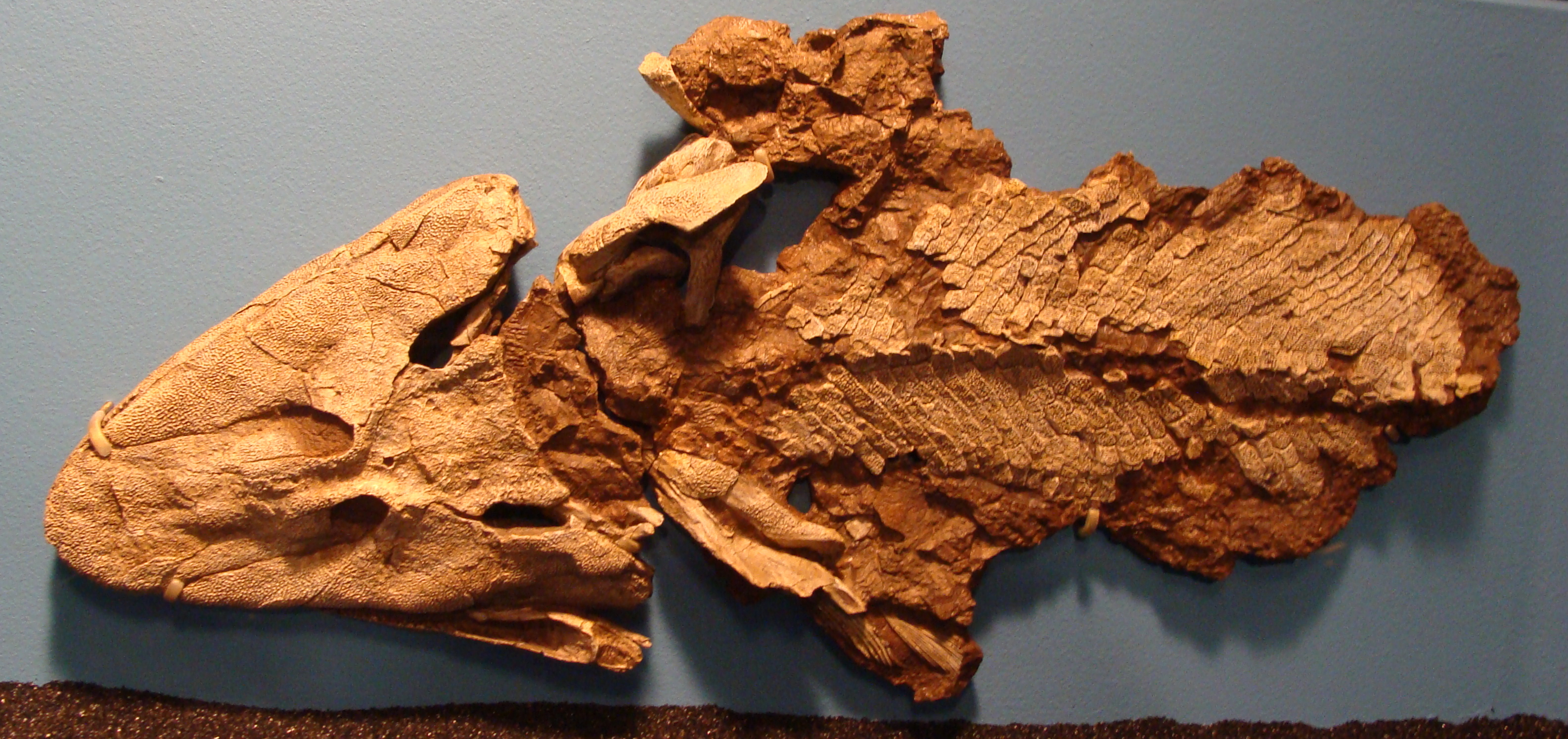
- Cast of the Tiktaalik holotype in the Field Museum, Chicago

Scientific classification
- Kingdom: Animalia
- Phylum: Chordata
- Clade: Elpistostegalia
- Genus: †Tiktaalik; Daeschler, Shubin & Jenkins, 2006

Type species
- †Tiktaalik roseae Daeschler, Shubin & Jenkins, 2006

= Tiktaalik =

Tiktaalik Temporal range: Late Devonian (Frasnian), 375 Ma

Extinct genus of tetrapodomorphs

Tiktaalik (/tɪkˈtɑːlɪk/; Inuktitut: ᑎᒃᑖᓕᒃ [tiktaːlik]) is a monospecific genus of extinct sarcopterygian (lobe-finned fish) from the late Devonian Period, about 375 Mya (million years ago), having many features similar to those of tetrapods (four-legged animals). Tiktaalik is estimated to have had a total length of 1.25–2.75 metres (4.1–9.0 ft) on the basis of various specimens.

Unearthed in Arctic Canada, Tiktaalik is a non-tetrapod member of Osteichthyes (bony fish), complete with scales and gills—but it has a triangular, flattened head and unusual, cleaver-shaped fins. Its fins have thin ray bones for paddling like most fish, but they also have sturdy interior bones that would have allowed Tiktaalik to prop itself up in shallow water and use its limbs for support as most four-legged animals do. Those fins and other mixed characteristics mark Tiktaalik as a crucial transition fossil, a link in evolution from swimming fish to four-legged vertebrates. This and similar animals might be the common ancestors of all vertebrate terrestrial fauna.

The first Tiktaalik fossils were found in 2004 on Ellesmere Island in Nunavut, Canada. The discovery, made by Edward B. Daeschler of the Academy of Natural Sciences, Neil H. Shubin from the University of Chicago, and Harvard University Professor Farish A. Jenkins Jr., was published in the April 6, 2006 issue of Nature and quickly recognized as a transitional form. Tiktaalik has subsequently become one of the most widely known fossils of the fish-tetrapod transition, along with Acanthostega and Ichthyostega from Greenland.

== Discovery ==
Discovery site of Tiktaalik fossils

In 2004, three fossilized Tiktaalik remains were discovered in the Late Devonian fluvial Fram Formation on Ellesmere Island, Nunavut, in northern Canada. Estimated ages were reported at 375 Ma, 379 Ma and 383 Ma. At the time of the species' existence, Ellesmere Island was part of the continent Laurentia (modern eastern North America and Greenland), which was centered on the equator and had a warm climate. When discovered, one of the skulls was found sticking out of a cliff. Upon further inspection, the fossil was found to be in excellent condition for a 375-million-year-old specimen.

The discovery by Daeschler, Shubin and Jenkins was published in the April 6, 2006 issue of Nature and quickly recognized as a transitional form. Jennifer A. Clack, a Cambridge University expert on tetrapod evolution, said of Tiktaalik, "It's one of those things you can point to and say, 'I told you this would exist,' and there it is."

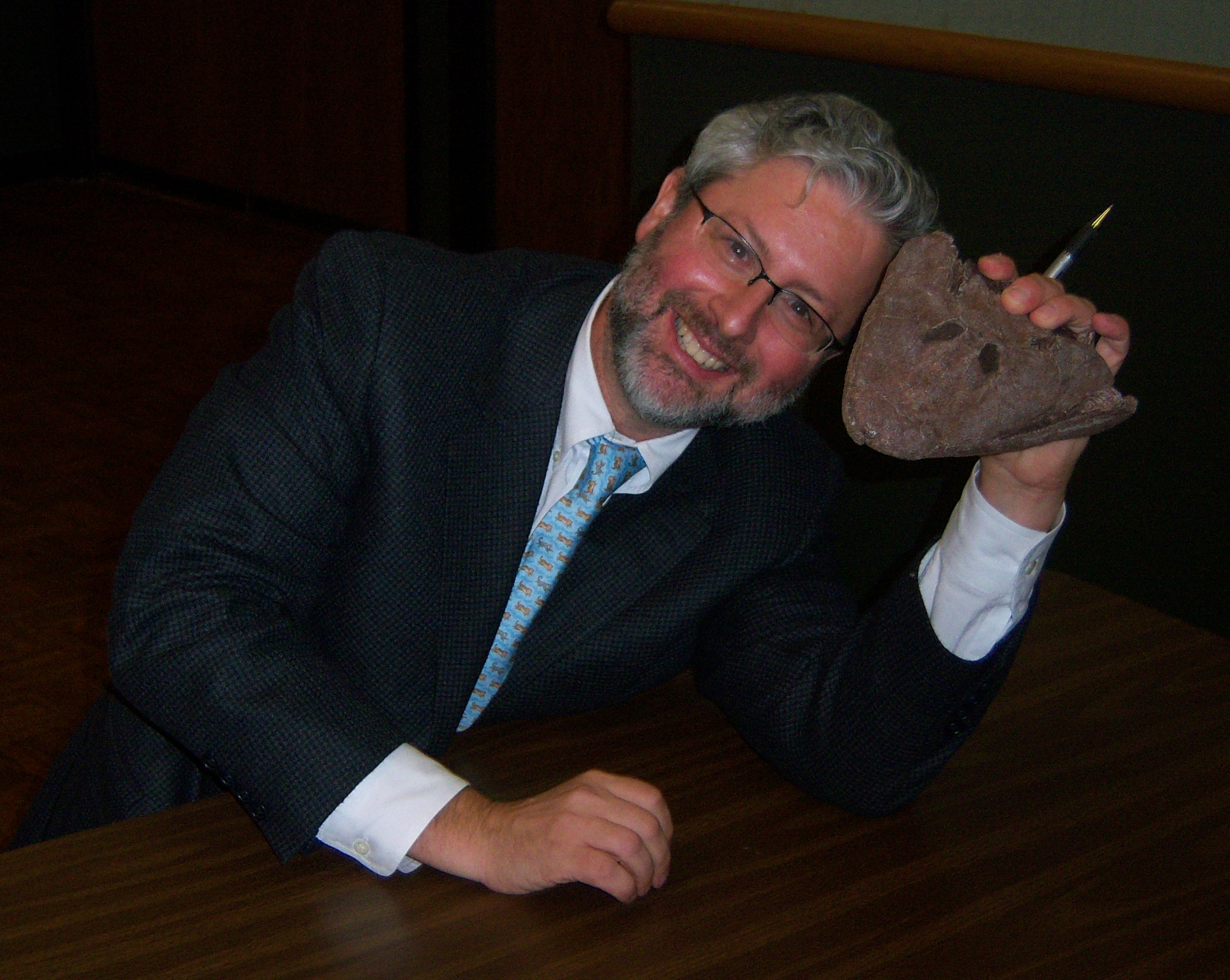
Neil Shubin, one of the paleontologists who discovered Tiktaalik, holding a cast of its skull

After five years of digging on Ellesmere Island, in the far north of Nunavut, they hit pay dirt: a collection of several fish so beautifully preserved that their skeletons were still intact. As Shubin's team studied the species they saw to their excitement that it was exactly the missing intermediate they were looking for. 'We found something that really split the difference right down the middle,' says Daeschler.

—

Tiktaalik is an Inuktitut word meaning "large freshwater fish". The "fishapod" genus received this name after a suggestion by Inuit elders of Canada's Nunavut Territory, where the fossil was discovered. The specific name roseae honours an anonymous donor. Taking a detailed look at the internal head skeleton of Tiktaalik roseae, in the October 16, 2008, issue of Nature, researchers show how Tiktaalik was gaining structures that could allow it to support itself on solid ground and breathe air, a key intermediate step in the transformation of the skull that accompanied the shift to life on land by our distant ancestors. More than 60 specimens of Tiktaalik have been discovered, though the holotype remains the most complete and well-described fossil.

== Description ==
Size comparison of the holotype and large Tiktaalik specimens compared to a human

Tiktaalik provides insights on the features of the extinct closest relatives of the tetrapods. Tiktaalik was a large fish: the largest known fossils have an estimated length of 2.75 m (9.02 feet), with the longest lower jaws reaching a length of 31 centimetres (1.0 ft).

=== Skull and neck ===
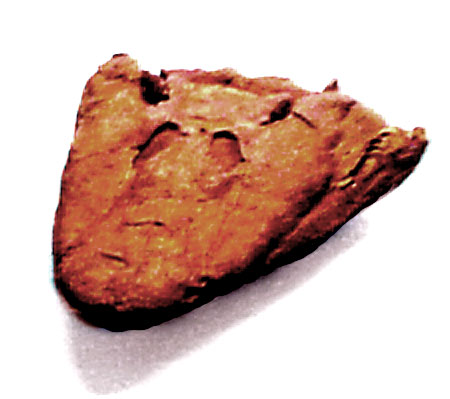
Skull showing otic notches above the eyes

The skull of Tiktaalik was low and flat, more similar in shape to that of a salamander than most fish. The rear edge of the skull was excavated by a pair of indentations known as otic notches. These notches may have housed spiracles on the top of the head, which suggest the creature had primitive lungs as well as gills. Tiktaalik also lacked a characteristic most fishes have—bony plates in the gill area that restrict lateral head movement. This makes Tiktaalik the earliest-known fish to have a neck, with the pectoral (shoulder) girdle separate from the skull. This would give the creature more freedom in hunting prey on land or in the shallows.

=== Forelimbs ===
The "fins" of Tiktaalik have helped to contextualize the origin of weight-bearing limbs and digits. The fin has both a robust internal skeleton, like tetrapods, surrounded by a web of simple bony fin rays (lepidotrichia), like fish. The lepidotrichia are thickest and most extensive on the front edge and upper side of the fin, leaving more room for muscle and skin on the underside of the fin. The pectoral fin was clearly weight bearing, being attached to a massive shoulder girdle with expanded scapular and coracoid elements attached to the body armor. Moreover, there are large muscle scars on the underside of the forefin bones, and the distal joints of the wrist are highly mobile. Together, these suggest that the fin was both muscular and had the ability to flex like a wrist joint. These wrist-like features would have helped anchor the creature to the bottom in a fast current.

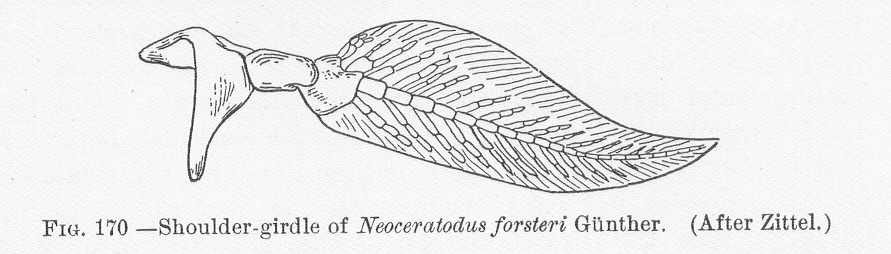
Pectoral fin of the Australian lungfish (Neoceratodus fosteri), showing an anatomy common to many lobe-finned fish. The metapterygial axis (a line of rectangular axials) runs down the middle of the fin, flanked by radials which branch away from the midline, and finally very thin fin rays (lepidotrichia)

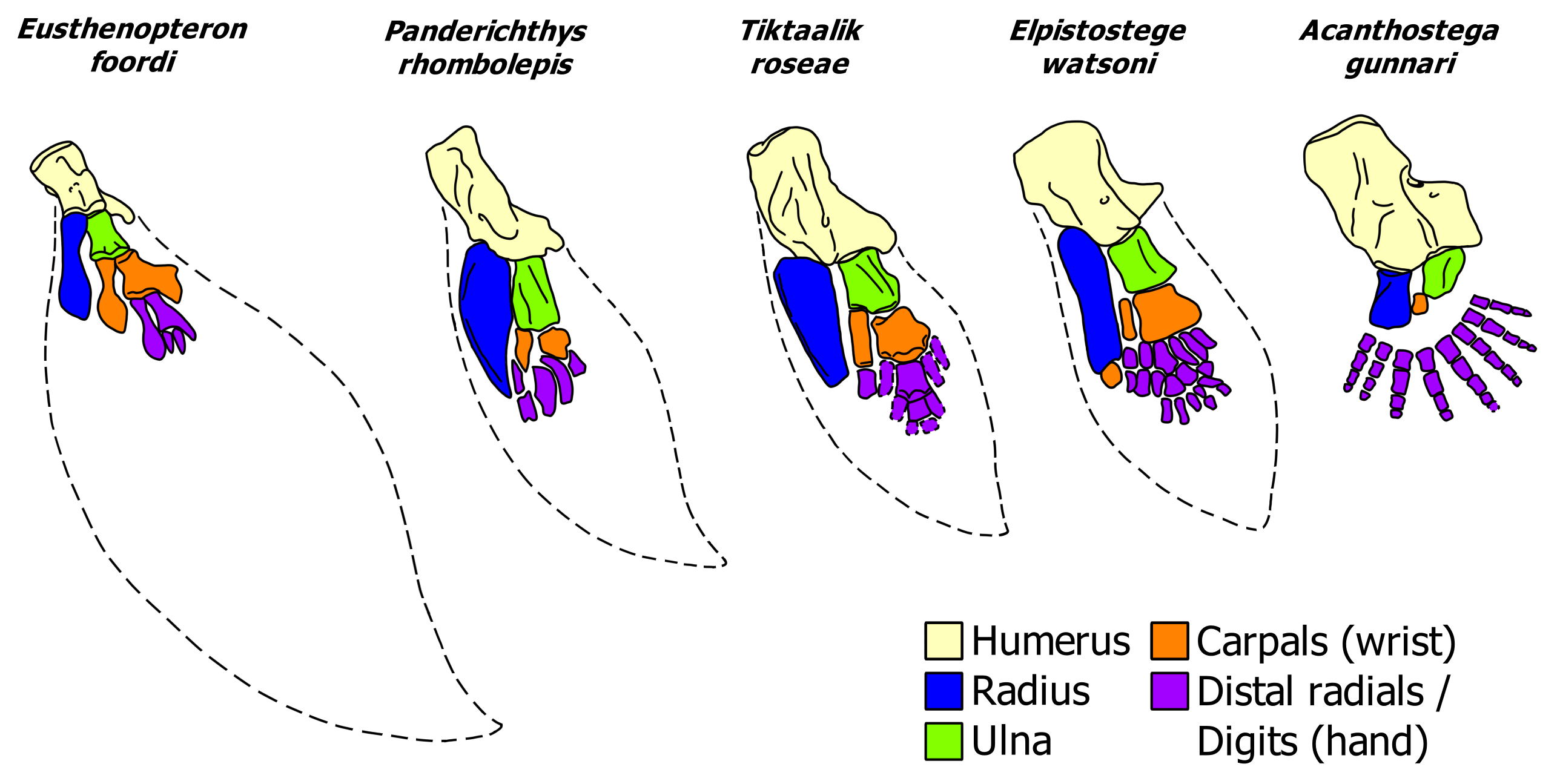
Comparisons between Devonian tetrapodomorphs during the transition from pectoral fins to forelimbs. Tiktaalik is at the middle.

One of the persistent questions facing paleontologists is the evolution of the tetrapod limb: specifically, how the internal bones of lobed fins evolved into the feet and toes of tetrapods. In many lobe-finned fish, including living coelacanths and the Australian lungfish, the fin skeleton is based around a straight string of midline bones, making up a unit known as the metapterygial axis. The component bones of this axis, arranged in a single line, are known as axials or mesomeres. The axis is flanked by one or two series of rod-like bones known as radials. Radials can be characterized as preaxial (in front of the axials) or postaxial (behind the axials). The semi-symmetrical form of a lobed fin is difficult to homologize with the less linear construction of tetrapod lower limbs.

Tiktaalik retains a metapterygial axis with distinctly enlarged axial bones, a very fish-like condition. Even Panderichthys, which is otherwise more fish-like, seems to be more advanced towards a tetrapod-like limb. Nevertheless, the internal skeleton of Tiktaalik's pectoral fin can still be equated to the forelimb bones of tetrapods. The first and largest axial, at the base of the fin, has developed into the humerus, the single large bone making up the stylopodium (upper arm). This is followed by the two bones of the zeugopodium (forearm): the radius (i.e., the first preaxial radial) and ulna (i.e., the second axial). The radius is much larger than the ulna, and its front edge thins into a sharp blade like that of Panderichthys.

Further down, the internal skeleton transitions into the mesopodium, which in tetrapods contains the bones of the wrist. Tiktaalik has two large wrist bones: the narrow intermedium (i.e., the second preaxial radial) and the blocky ulnare (i.e., the third axial). In tetrapods, the wrist is followed by the hand and finger bones. The origin of these bones has long been a topic of contention.

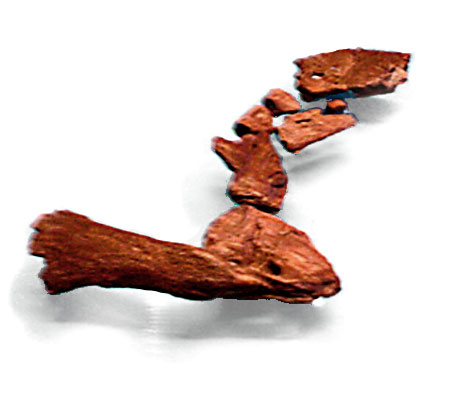
Forelimb from shoulder (bottom left) to fin (top right)

In the early 20th century, most paleontologists considered the digits to develop symmetrically from radials at the tip of the fin. Another school of thought, popularized in the 1940s, argued that the hand was neomorphic. In other words, it was an entirely new structure that spontaneously evolved after the distal axials and radials were reduced. A third hypothesis, emphasized by Shubin and Alberch (1986), is that digits are homologous to postaxial radials in particular. This interpretation, better known as the digital arch model, is supported by numerous developmental studies. A consistent set of Hox genes are responsible for moderating both the rear edge of the fin (in several modern fish) and the digits of modern tetrapods as their embryos develop. The digital arch model posits that the metapterygial axis was bent forwards at a sharp angle near the origin of tetrapods. This allowed the axials to transform into wrist bones, while the narrower postaxial radials splay out and evolve into fingers.

Tiktaalik presents a contradictory set of traits. As predicted by the digital arch model, there are multiple (at least eight) rectangular distal radials arranged in a dispersed pattern, similar to fingers. Some of the radials are even arranged sequentially, akin to finger joints. However, the metapterygial axis is straight and runs down the middle of the fin. Only three of the finger-like radials appear to be postaxial, while the model predicts that most or all of the radials should be postaxial. It remains to be seen whether any of the distal radials of Tiktaalik are homologous to fingers. Finger-like distal radials are also known in other elpistostegalians: Panderichthys (which has at least four) and Elpistostege (which has 19).

=== Hip and hindlimbs ===
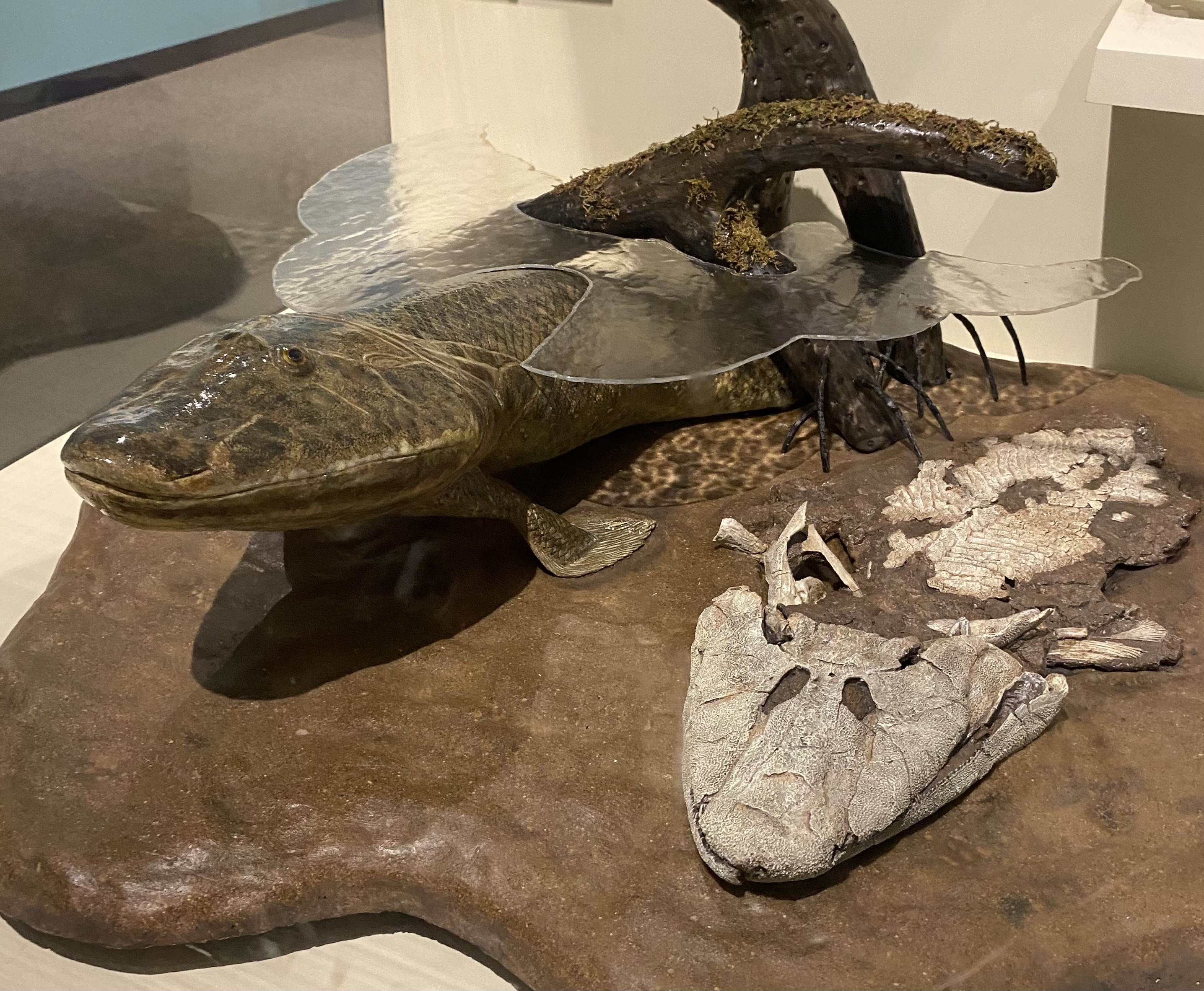
Tiktaalik roseae model at the Harvard Museum of Natural History

As with other regions of the body, the pelvis (hip) was intermediate in form between earlier lobe-finned fish (like Gooloogongia and Eusthenopteron) and tetrapods (like Acanthostega). The pelvis was much larger than in other fish, nearly the same size as the shoulder girdle, like tetrapods. In terms of shape, the pelvis is a single bone, much more similar to fish. There is a broad upper iliac blade continuous with a low semi-cartilaginous pubic process in front of the acetabulum (hip socket). This contrasts with the more complex pelvis of tetrapods, which have three separate bones (the ilium, pubis and ischium) making up the hip. In addition, in tetrapods the left and right pelvises often connect to each other or the spinal column, while in Tiktaalik each side of the pelvis is fully separate. The orientation of the hip socket is halfway between the rear-facing socket of other fish and the sideways-facing socket of tetrapods.

The hindlimbs, also known as pelvic fins, appear to be almost as long as the forelimbs. This is yet another trait more similar to tetrapods than to other fish. Though not all bones are preserved in the fossil, it is clear that the hindlimbs of Tiktaalik had lepidotrichia and at least three large rod-like ankle bones. If fully preserved, the pelvic fins would probably have been internally and externally very similar to the pectoral fins. The Specimen MCZ 11916 from the Museum of Comparative Zoology reveals a well-preserved femur with broad, well defined preaxial and postaxial margins. The femur expands distally into three articular facets, each connecting to separate radial elements with varying shapes. The anterior radial tapers distally and doesn't appear to articulate further, the middle radial has a constructed shaft, and the posterior radial displays a pronounced flange. Both the middle and posterior radials exhibit expanded distal ends, and all three radials are elongate, cylindrical bones with well-developed outer bone layers. The ends of the femur and radial have become completely ossified, so this preservation indicates a likelihood of a previous presence of cartilaginous joint surfaces. The fin, in general, is associated with a plentiful number of scales and fin rays (Lepidotrichia), the basal segments of which are elongated and overlap a decent portion of the internal skeleton beyond the femur. This condition can also be seen in rhizodontid fins.

=== Torso ===
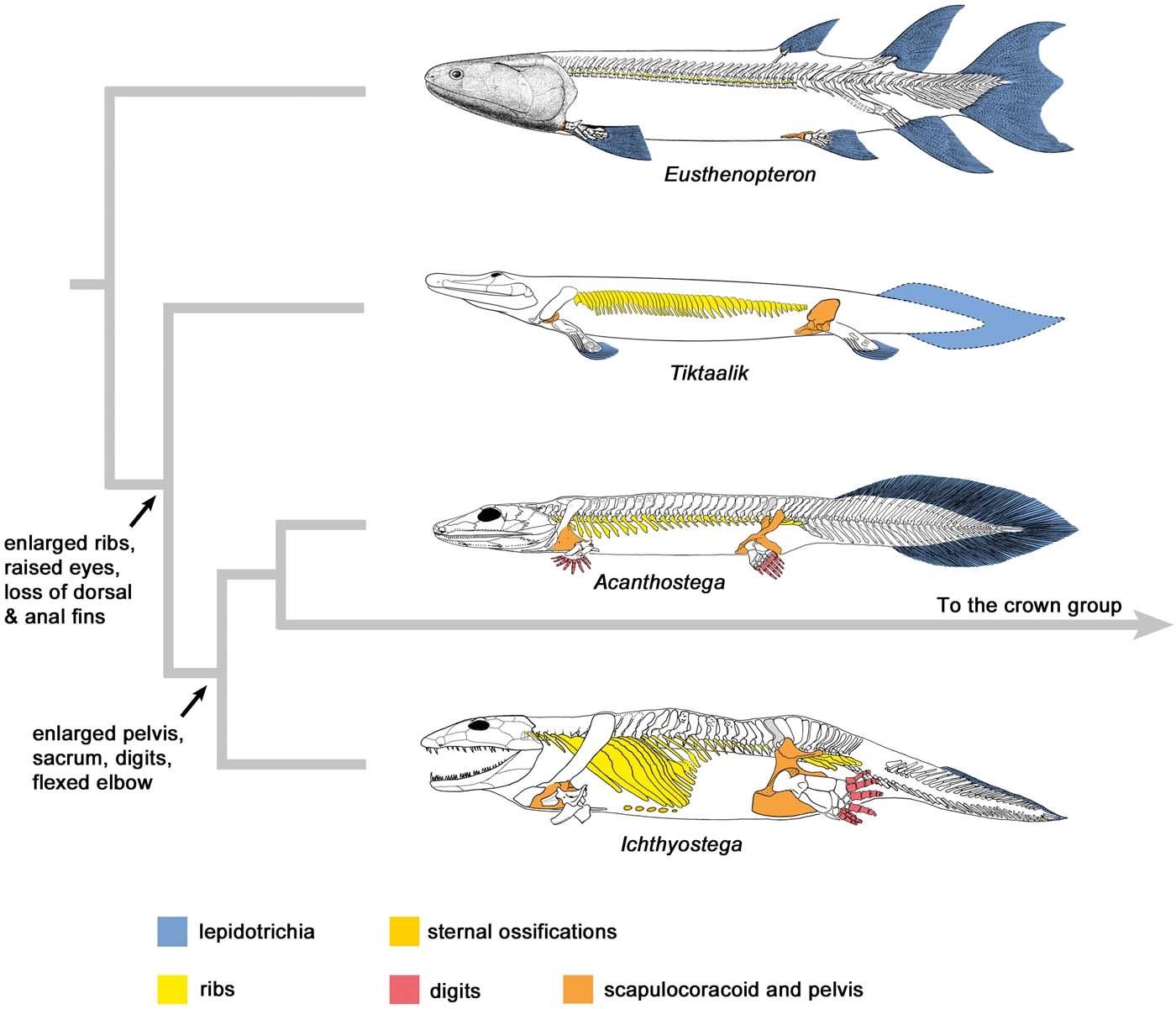
Simplified phylogeny of the fish–tetrapod transition. Note the enlargement of the ribcage and pelvis.

The torso of Tiktaalik is elongated by the standards of most Devonian tetrapodomorphs. Although the vertebrae are not ossified, there are about 45 pairs of ribs between the skull and the hip region. The ribs are larger than in earlier fish, imbricating (overlapping) via blade-like flanges. Imbricating ribs are also known in Ichthyostega, though in that taxon the ribs are more diverse in shape.

Tiktaalik most likely lacked dorsal fins, like other elpistostegalians as well as tetrapods. The shape of the tail and caudal fin are unknown, since that portion of the skeleton has not been preserved. Many lobe-finned fish have a single anal fin on the underside of the tail, behind the pelvic fins. While not reported in Tiktaalik, an anal fin can be observed in Elpistostege, a close relative.

Tiktaalik was covered by rhombic (diamond-shaped) bony scales, most similar to Panderichthys among lobe-finned fish. The scales are roughly textured, slightly broader than long, and overlap from front-to-back.

Strong lungs (as supported by the plausible presence of a spiracle) may have led to the evolution of a more robust ribcage, a key evolutionary trait of land-living creatures. The more robust ribcage of Tiktaalik would have helped support the animal's body any time it ventured outside a fully aquatic habitat.

Tiktaalik is sometimes compared to gars (especially the alligator gar), with whom it shares a number of characteristics:

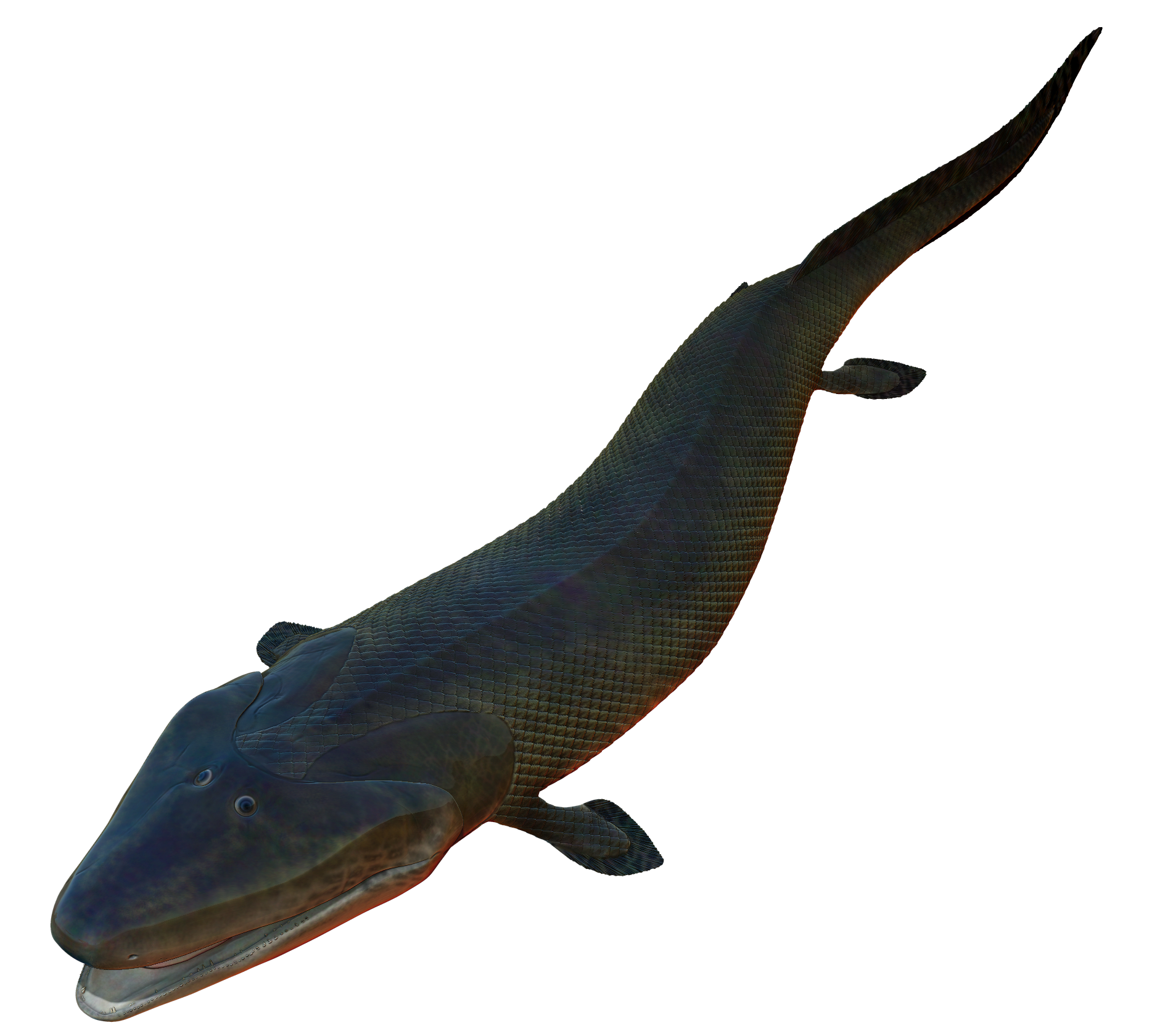
Restoration

- Diamond-shaped scale patterns common to the Crossopterygii class (in both species scales are rhombic, overlapping and tuberculated);
- Teeth structured in two rows;
- Both internal and external nostrils;
- Tubular and streamlined body;
- Absence of anterior dorsal fin;
- Broad, dorsoventrally compressed skull;
- Paired frontal bones;
- Marginal nares;
- Subterminal mouth;
- Lung-like organ.

== Classification and evolution ==
In Late Devonian vertebrate speciation, descendants of pelagic lobe-finned fish—like Eusthenopteron—exhibited a sequence of adaptations: Panderichthys, suited to muddy shallows; Tiktaalik with limb-like fins that could take it onto land; Early tetrapods in weed-filled swamps, such as: Acanthostega which had feet with eight digits, Ichthyostega with limbs.; Descendants also included pelagic lobe-finned fish such as coelacanth species.

Tiktaalik roseae is the only species classified under the genus. Tiktaalik lived approximately 375 million years ago. It is representative of the transition between non-tetrapod vertebrates (fish) such as Panderichthys, known from fossils 380 million years old, and early tetrapods such as Acanthostega and Ichthyostega, known from fossils about 365 million years old. Its mixture of primitive fish and derived tetrapod characteristics led one of its discoverers, Neil Shubin, to characterize Tiktaalik as a "fishapod".

Tiktaalik is a transitional fossil; it is to tetrapods what Archaeopteryx is to birds. While it may be that neither is ancestor to any living animal, they serve as evidence that intermediates between very different types of vertebrates did once exist. The mixture of both fish and tetrapod characteristics found in Tiktaalik include these traits:

- Fish
  - Fish gills
  - Fish scales
  - Fish fins
- "Fishapod"
  - Half-fish, half-tetrapod limb bones and joints, including a functional wrist joint and radiating, fish-like fins instead of toes
  - Half-fish, half-tetrapod ear region
- Tetrapod
  - Tetrapod rib bones
  - Tetrapod mobile neck with separate pectoral girdle
  - Tetrapod lungs

Cladogram of Tetrapodomorpha after Pardo, 2024:

- Tetrapodomorpha
  - †Eusthenopteron
  - †Panderichthys
  - - †Tiktaalik
    - limbs present
      - †Ymeria
      - †Ventastega
      - †Ichthyostega
      - - †Acanthostega
        - - †Aistopoda
          - †Whatcheeria
          - †Pederpes
          - - †Crassigyrinus
            - - †Greererpeton
              - - †Embolomeri
                - - - †Eucritta
                    - †Baphetes
                  - crown group Tetrapoda
                    - Temnospondyli (including Lissamphibia)
                    - - †Seymouriamorpha (Seymouria)
                      - - †Diadectomorpha (Limnoscelis)
                        - Amniota (including modern mammals, reptiles and birds)

== Classification history ==
=== 2006–2010: Elpistostegids as tetrapod ancestors ===
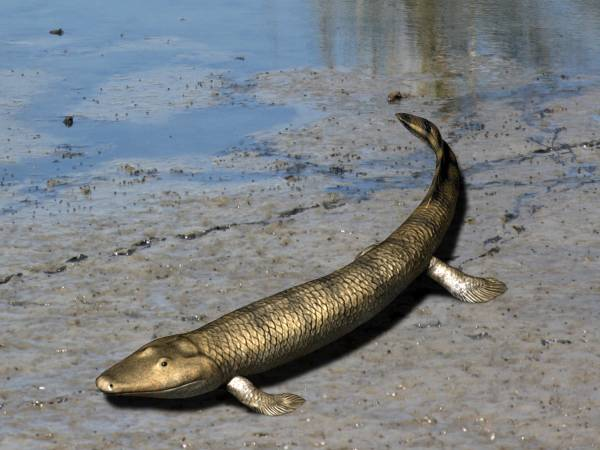
Life restoration of Tiktaalik

The phylogenetic analysis of Daeschler et al. (2006) placed Tiktaalik as a sister taxon to Elpistostege and directly above Panderichthys, which was preceded by Eusthenopteron. Tiktaalik was thus inserted below Acanthostega and Ichthyostega, acting as a transitional form between limbless fish and limbed vertebrates ("tetrapods"). Some press coverage also used the term "missing link", implying that Tiktaalik filled an evolutionary gap between fish and tetrapods. Nevertheless, Tiktaalik has never been claimed to be a direct ancestor to tetrapods. Rather, its fossils help to illuminate evolutionary trends and approximate the hypothetical true ancestor to the tetrapod lineage, which would have been similar in form and ecology.

In its original description, Tiktaalik was described as a member of Elpistostegalia, a name previously used to refer to particularly tetrapod-like fish such as Elpistostege and Panderichthys. Daeschler et al. (2006) recognized that this term referred to a paraphyletic grade of fish incrementally closer to tetrapods. Elpistostegalian fish have few unique traits which are not retained from earlier fish or inherited by later tetrapods.

In response, Daescler et al. (2006) redefined Elpisostegalia as a clade, including all vertebrates descended from the common ancestor of Panderichthys, Elpistostege and tetrapods. Nevertheless, they still retained the phrase "elpistostegalian fish" to refer to the grade of early elpisostegalians which had not acquired limbs, digits, or other specializations which define tetrapods. In this sense, Tiktaalik is an elpistostegalian fish. Later papers also use the term "elpisostegid" for the same category of Devonian fish.

This order of the phylogenetic tree was initially adopted by other experts, most notably by Per Ahlberg and Jennifer Clack. However, it was questioned in a 2008 paper by Boisvert et al., who noted that Panderichthys, due to its more derived distal forelimb structure, might be closer to tetrapods than Tiktaalik or even that it was convergent with tetrapods. Ahlberg, co-author of the study, considered the possibility of Tiktaalik's fin having been "an evolutionary return to a more primitive form."

=== 2010–present: Further debate ===
Zachełmie trackmakers predate not only ichthyostegids and elpistostegids (including Tiktaalik) but also a number of tetrapodomorph fish which until 2010 were unanimously considered ancestors of tetrapods.

The proposed origin of tetrapods among elpistostegalian fish was called into question by a discovery made in the Holy Cross Mountains of Poland. In January 2010, a group of paleontologists (including Ahlberg) published on a series of trackways from the Eifelian stage of the Middle Devonian, about 12 million years older than Tiktaalik. These trackways, discovered at the Zachełmie quarry, appear to have been created by fully terrestrial tetrapods with a quadrupedal gait.

Tiktaalik's discoverers were skeptical about the Zachelmie trackways. Daeschler said that trace evidence was not enough for him to modify the theory of tetrapod evolution, while Shubin argued that Tiktaalik could have produced very similar footprints. In a later study, Shubin expressed a significantly modified opinion that some of the Zachelmie footprints, those which lacked digits, may have been made by walking fish. However, Ahlberg insisted that those tracks could not have possibly been formed either by natural processes or by transitional species such as Tiktaalik or Panderichthys. Instead, the authors of the publication suggested that "ichthyostegalian"-grade tetrapods were the responsible trackmakers, based on available pes morphology of those animals.

Narkiewicz, co-author of the article on the Zachelmie trackways, claimed that the Polish "discovery has disproved the theory that elpistostegids were the ancestors of tetrapods", a notion partially shared by Philippe Janvier. To resolve the questions posed by the Zachelmie trackways, several hypotheses have been suggested. One approach maintains that the first pulse of elpistostegalian and tetrapod evolution occurring in the Middle Devonian, a time when body fossils showing this trend are too rare to be preserved. This maintains the elpistostegalian–tetrapod ancestor–descendant relationship apparent in fossils, but also introduces long ghost lineages required to explain the apparent delay in fossil appearances. Another approach is that elpistostegalian and tetrapod similarities are a case of convergent evolution. In this interpretation, tetrapods would originate in the Middle Devonian while elpisostegalians originate independently in the Late Devonian, before going extinct near the end of the period.

Estimates published after the discovery of Zachelmie tracks suggested that digited tetrapods may have appeared as early as 427.4 Mya and questioned attempts to read absolute timing of evolutionary events in early tetrapod evolution from stratigraphy.

However, a reanalysis of the Zachelmie trackways in 2015 suggested that they do not constitute movement trackways, but should rather be interpreted as fish nests or feeding traces. A 2022 study suggested that the Zachelmie trackways were "largely accepted" as genuine tetrapod trackways.

== Paleobiology ==
Tiktaalik generally had the characteristics of a lobe-finned fish, but with front fins featuring arm-like skeletal structures more akin to those of a crocodile, including a shoulder, elbow and wrist. The fossil discovered in 2004 did not include the rear fins and tail, which were found in other specimens. It had rows of sharp teeth indicative of a predator fish, and its neck could move independently of its body, which is not common in other fish (Tarrasius, Mandageria, placoderms and extant seahorses being some exceptions; see also Lepidogalaxias and Channallabes apus). The animal had a flat skull resembling a crocodile's; eyes on top of its head; a neck and ribs similar to those of tetrapods, with the ribs being used to support its body and aid in breathing via lungs; well developed jaws suitable for catching prey; and a small gill slit called a spiracle that, in more derived animals, became an ear. Spiracles would have been useful in shallow water, where higher water temperature would lower oxygen content.

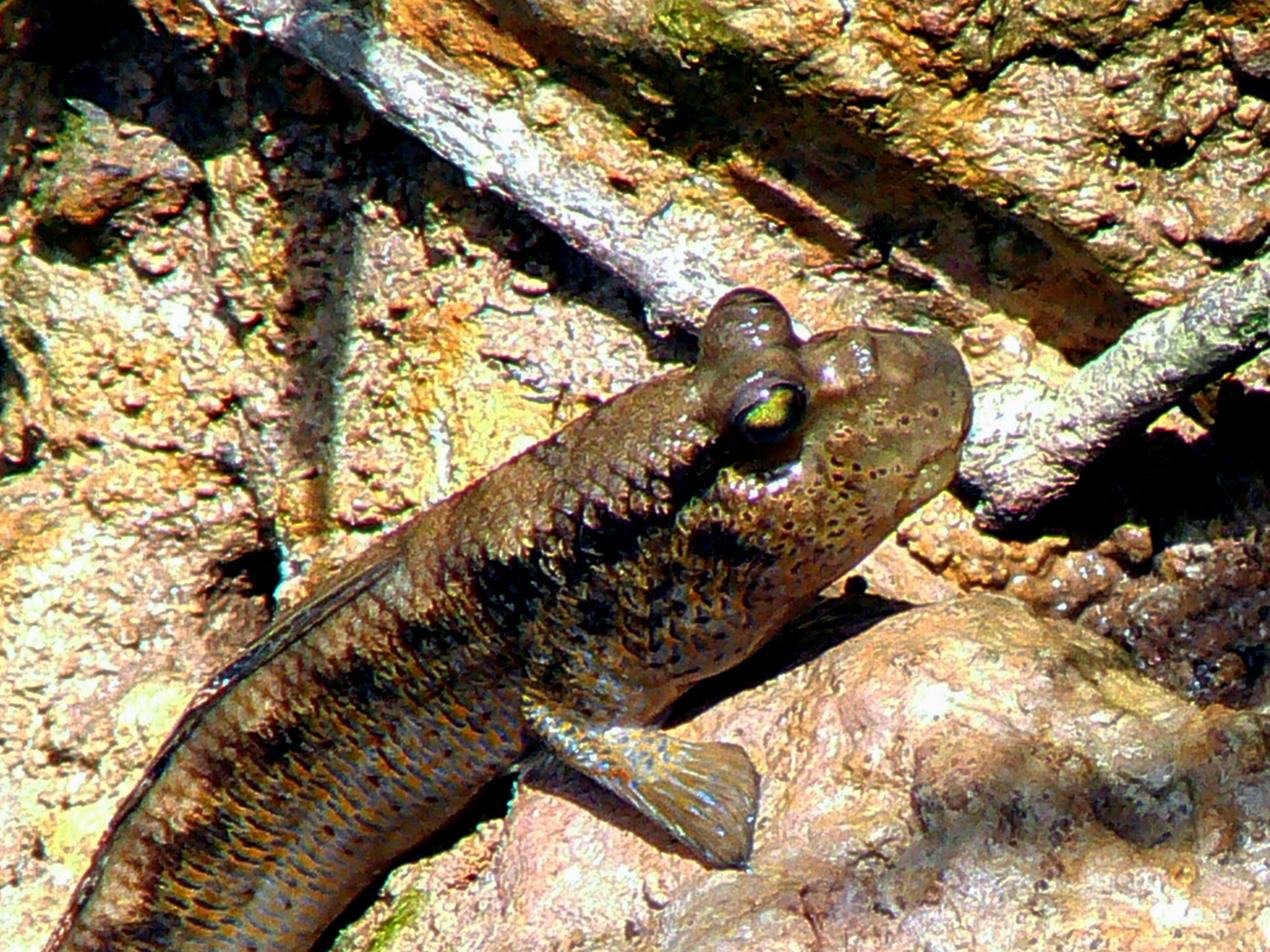
Tiktaalik's discoverers believe the animal ventured onto land just as present-day mudskippers do, propping up on their fins.

The discoverers said that in all likelihood, Tiktaalik flexed its proto-limbs primarily on the floor of streams and may have pulled itself onto the shore for brief periods. In 2014, the discovery of the animal's pelvic girdle was announced; it was strongly built, indicating the animal could have used them for moving in shallow water and across mudflats. Neil Shubin and Daeschler, the leaders of the team, have been searching Ellesmere Island for fossils since 2000:

We're making the hypothesis that this animal was specialized for living in shallow stream systems, perhaps swampy habitats, perhaps even to some of the ponds. And maybe occasionally, using its very specialized fins, for moving up overland. And that's what is particularly important here. The animal is developing features which will eventually allow animals to exploit land.

== Paleoecology ==
The fossils of Tiktaalik were found in the Fram Formation, deposits of meandering stream systems near the Devonian equator, suggesting a benthic animal that lived on the bottom of shallow waters and perhaps even out of the water for short periods, with a skeleton indicating that it could support its body under the force of gravity whether in very shallow water or on land. At that period, for the first time, deciduous plants were flourishing and annually shedding leaves into the water, attracting small prey into warm oxygen-poor shallows that were difficult for larger fish to swim in.

== Cultural significance ==
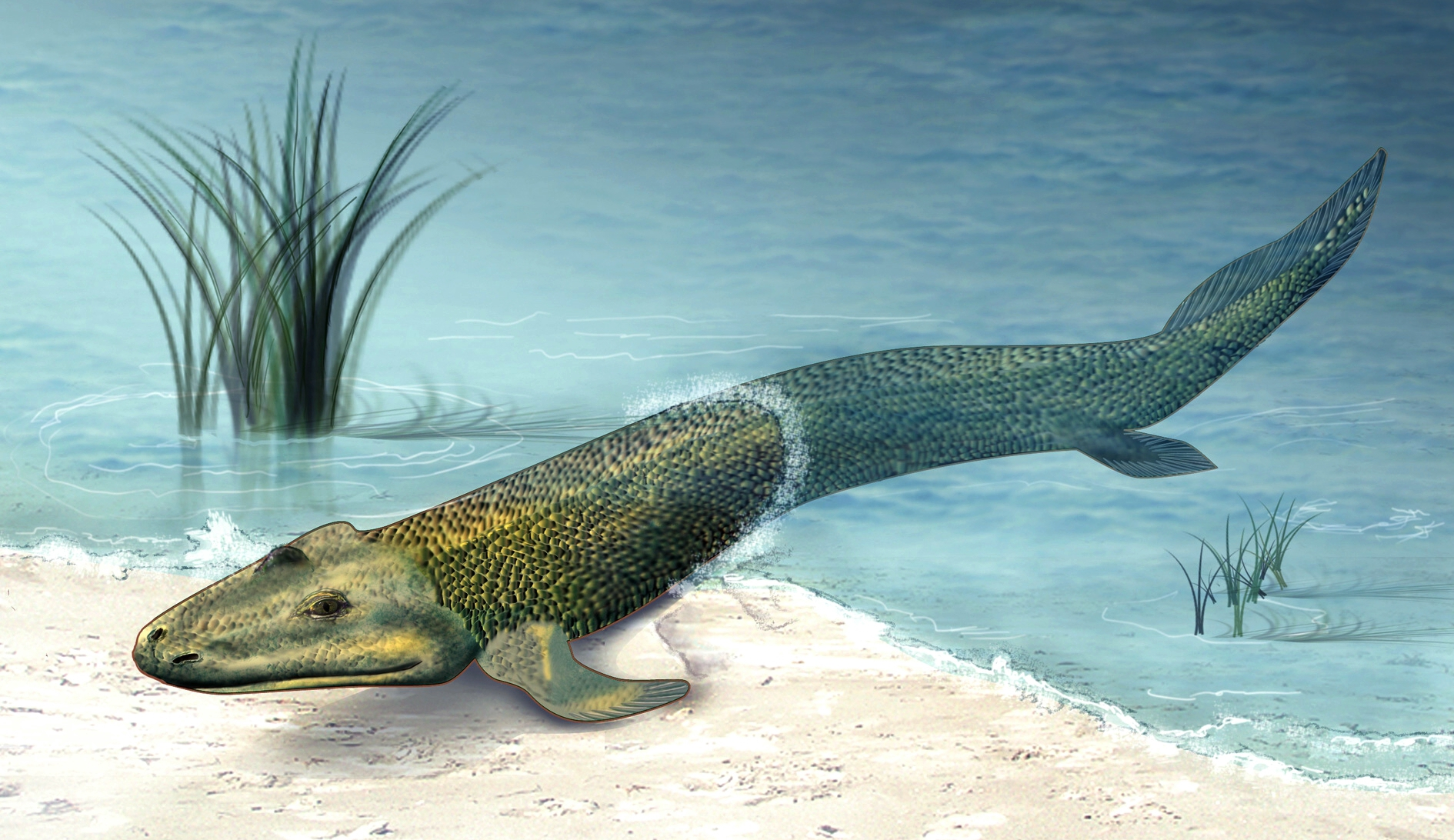
This image by Zina Deretsky has been used in many memes.

Various Internet memes criticize Tiktaalik for its evolutionary adaptations, construing its venture onto land as the critical cause for a chain of events that eventually led to all human suffering. These memes have been positively acknowledged by Shubin.

== See also ==
- Walking fish
- Alligator gar
- Amphibious fish
- Spotted handfish

Other lobe-finned fish found in fossils from the Devonian Period:

- Coelacanth
- Eusthenopteron
- Gogonasus
- Ichthyostega
- Panderichthys
