= Jakubsonia =

Jakubsonia Temporal range: Late Devonian

Scientific classification
- Domain: Eukaryota
- Kingdom: Animalia
- Phylum: Chordata
- Clade: Sarcopterygii
- Clade: Tetrapodomorpha
- Clade: Stegocephali
- Genus: †Jakubsonia; Lebedev, 2004

Type species
- †J. livnensis Lebedev, 2004

Extinct genus of tetrapodomorphs

Jakubsonia is an extinct genus of early tetrapod from the Late Devonian of Russia. The type species, Jakubsonia livnensis, was described and named in 2004.
