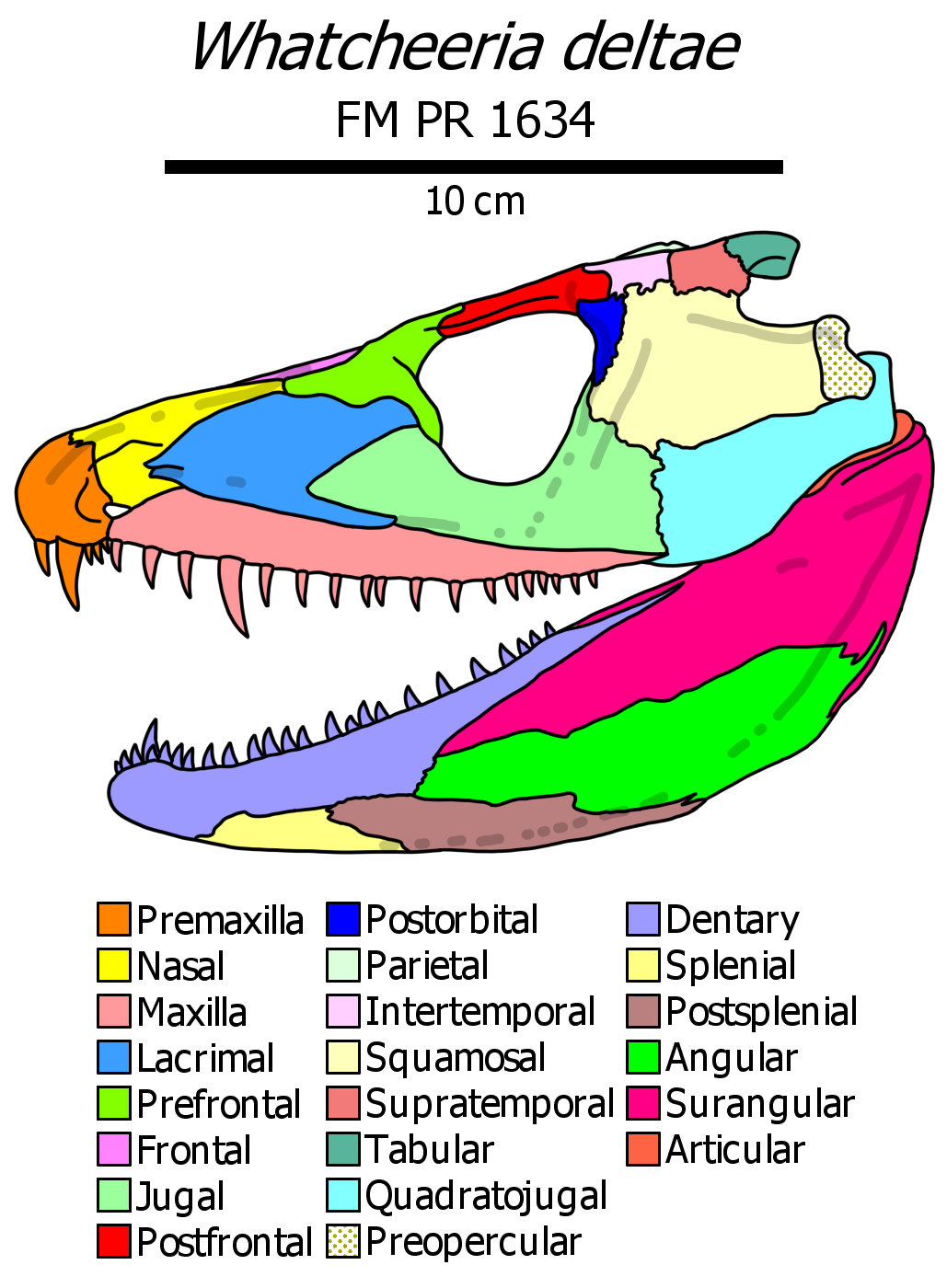
- Skull diagram

Scientific classification
- Kingdom: Animalia
- Phylum: Chordata
- Clade: Elpistostegalia
- Clade: Stegocephali
- Family: †Whatcheeriidae
- Genus: †Whatcheeria; Lombard and Bolt, 1995

Species
- †W. deltae Lombard and Bolt, 1995 (type)

= Whatcheeria =

Whatcheeria Temporal range: Early Carboniferous, late Viséan - early Serpukhovian?

Extinct genus of tetrapods

Whatcheeria is an extinct genus of early tetrapod from the Mississippian (Early Carboniferous) of Iowa. Fossils have been found in 340 million year old fissure fill deposits in the town of Delta. The type species, Whatcheeria deltae was named in 1995. It is classified within the family Whatcheeriidae, along with the closely related Pederpes and possibly Ossinodus.

Whatcheeria is named after What Cheer, Iowa, the hometown of Pat McAdams, the geologist who discovered the first skeletons of the animal. The species is named after Delta, Iowa, the location where the fossils were uncovered.

== Description ==
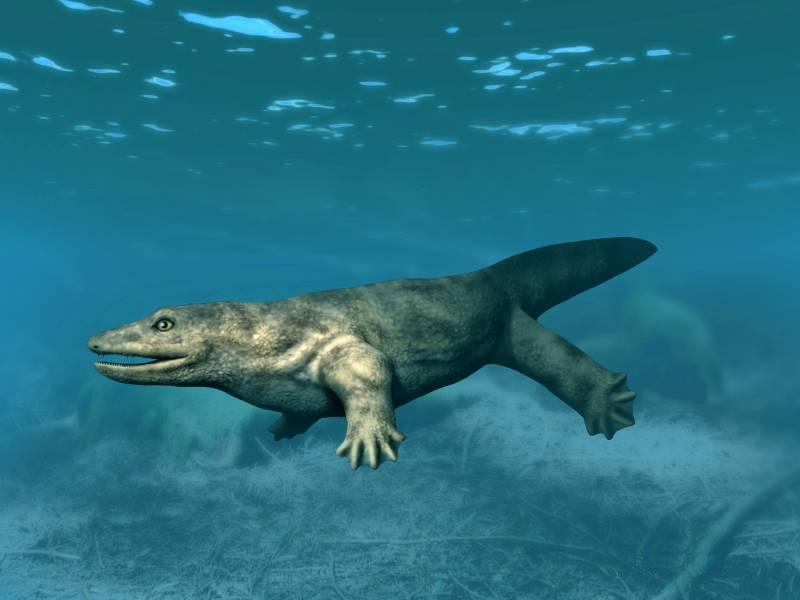
Life restoration

Whatcheeria possesses a mixture of both primitive and derived traits. It shares with earlier stem tetrapods a series of lateral lines across the skull, rows of teeth on the palate, and small Meckelian foramina across the surface of the lower jaw. It has a cleithrum, a bone in the pectoral girdle that extends from the scapula. The cleithrum once attached to the skull in lobe-finned fish, the ancestors of tetrapods, but detached to allow the neck to move freely.

Whatcheeria grew to up to 2 metres (6.6 ft) long. The skull is deep and the snout is pointed. A hole on the top of the skull behind the eyes called the parietal foramen is relatively large in Whatcheeria. The bones on the skull surface are unusually smooth, unlike the pitted skulls of many other early tetrapods. In front of the eye socket, the prefrontal bone forms a prominent ridge. The prefrontal also projects downward to cover a possible sinus.

== Paleoecology ==
The Delta fossil locality was discovered at the abandoned Jasper Hiemstra Quarry and excavated by paleontologists in the late 1980s. The quarry preserves a pair of prehistoric bowl-shaped sinkhole deposits which collapsed into underlying muddy limestone layers of the Waugh and Verdi members of the St. Louis Formation. Most tetrapod fossils are concentrated in a narrow band of fine limy conglomerate deposited above a package of coarser breccia (from the initial collapse) and below the resurgence of muddy limestone. Invertebrate microfossils indicate that these sinkhole deposits are from the Mississippian (Early Carboniferous) subperiod. More precisely, they are probably late Viséan in age (Asbian, stage V3b). This corresponds to a maximum of 340-335 and a minimum of 333-326 million years old (possibly as young as the early Serpukhovian). The geology of the site conforms with an isolated brackish water environment, such as a lagoon, estuary, or mostly freshwater lake with only occasional marine influences.

Over 600 tetrapod fossils have been found at the Delta locality, some of which are partially articulated skulls and skeletons. Whatcheeria is estimated to represent up to 90% of tetrapod fossils from the site, though only 26 specimens can be referred to the genus with certainty. Prior to its 1995 description, Whatcheeria was referred to as a "proto- anthracosaur". Other tetrapods include Sigournea, the colosteid Deltaherpeton and an undescribed species of embolomere. Freshwater fish fossils are common, including remains of rhizodonts, putative "osteolepiforms", "palaeoniscoids", xenacanth sharks, petalodont-like chondrichthyans, gyracanthid acanthodians, and the lungfish Tranodis. Ostracods, snails, myriapods, and plant fossils have also been found at the site.

== Paleobiology ==
=== Lifestyle and locomotion ===
Whatcheeria was likely primarily aquatic: the poorly-ossified ankle and wrist are ill-suited for locomotion on land, as are the simple, blocky phalanges. This is supported further by the presence of lateral line canals on the skull. Regardless, the limbs are very large and strongly-built, with the shape of the humerus and ulna emphasizing retraction (swinging the forearms back to the torso) over any other direction of movement. Walking would have required strong lateral flexion (sideways bending) of the spine to allow the arms enough freedom of movement. Regardless, Whatcheeria was probably capable of significant lateral flexion due to its unspecialized posterior torso, similar to other early tetrapods. When swimming, Whatcheeria likely used its protruding limbs and paddle-like hands more than its short body or tail. A modern analogue may be the duckbilled platypus (Ornithorhynchus anatinus), a mammal which swims at low speed but high maneuverability via a paddling motion of the forelimbs. In life, Whatcheeria potentially hunted by walking along lakebeds or wading through shallow water, using its relatively flexible neck to augment its ability to capture prey. University of Chicago paleobiologists have likened its estimated lifestyle to modern freshwater predatory reptiles such as crocodilians and the alligator snapping turtle.

=== Feeding strategy ===
The unusually narrow skull of Whatcheeria was strongly reinforced by complex modes of contact between its constituent bones, similar to the Devonian tetrapod Acanthostega. The rear of the skull was replete with interdigitating sutures between the bones of the skull roof and cheek, which would have diluted forces of compression between the sides and top of the rear skull. The snout was supplied with various front-to-back overlapping scarf joints, which would have resisted torsion (twisting) from struggling prey. Whatcheeria emphasizes these traits even further than Acanthostega, combining interdigitation and scarf joints at the front of the palate, the tip of the snout, and throughout the lower jaw. This may correspond to greater strength (and thus more reinforcement) at the front of the jaw when attacking prey, a notion supported by larger anterior fangs in Whatcheeria than other early tetrapods. There are no adaptations for cranial kinesis or suction feeding in Whatcheeria; as a whole, its skull was a stable and strong platform for biting, with an emphasis on the front of the snout for initial prey capture.

=== Growth and development ===
Fossils of Whatcheeria represent a range of body sizes and ontogenetic stages, allowing it to decipher growth patterns in early tetrapods. Nine femora (thigh bones) from four size classes have been sampled for histological analyses, cutting a cross section through each bone to determine its developmental history. In larger femora, the cortex (hard outer bone layer) becomes proportionally thinner relative to the smallest femora, where the cortex makes up more than half of the bone's volume.

Size-related variation also shows up in the type of bone deposited in each femur. The smallest femora (size classes one and two, late juveniles to subadults) have a mixture of fibrolamellar bone (a fast-developing composite material combining random bone fibers and concreted osteons) and parallel-fibered bone (fibrous layers woven together at a medium rate along the inner cortex). The largest femora (size classes three and four, adults) lose their fibrolamellar bone and gain lamellar bone (dense, plate-like bone slowly deposited along the circumference of the outer cortex).

The presence of fibrolamellar bone is unique to Whatcheeria among early tetrapods, and is an indicator of fast juvenile development more similar to amniotes than most extinct or living amphibians. This condition suggests previously unexpected variability in the development of early tetrapods, considering there is also some evidence for faster-than-expected growth in Eusthenopteron, a tetrapodomorph fish related to tetrapods. The presence of parallel-fibered bone also indicate that the smallest known femora merely represent late juveniles, and that younger individuals, which likely developed even faster, have not been fossilized at the Delta locality. None of the femora have growth marks, meaning that growth was continuous year-round, and not interrupted by resource scarcity or adverse seasonality. A thin cortex may allow adult Whatcheeria to control their buoyancy more precisely, a useful adaptation for a large aquatic predator. Greererpeton, a colosteid from the same general time period, grew slower and less continuously, and retained a thick cortex well into adulthood. These developmental differences may be a consequence of niche differentiation.
