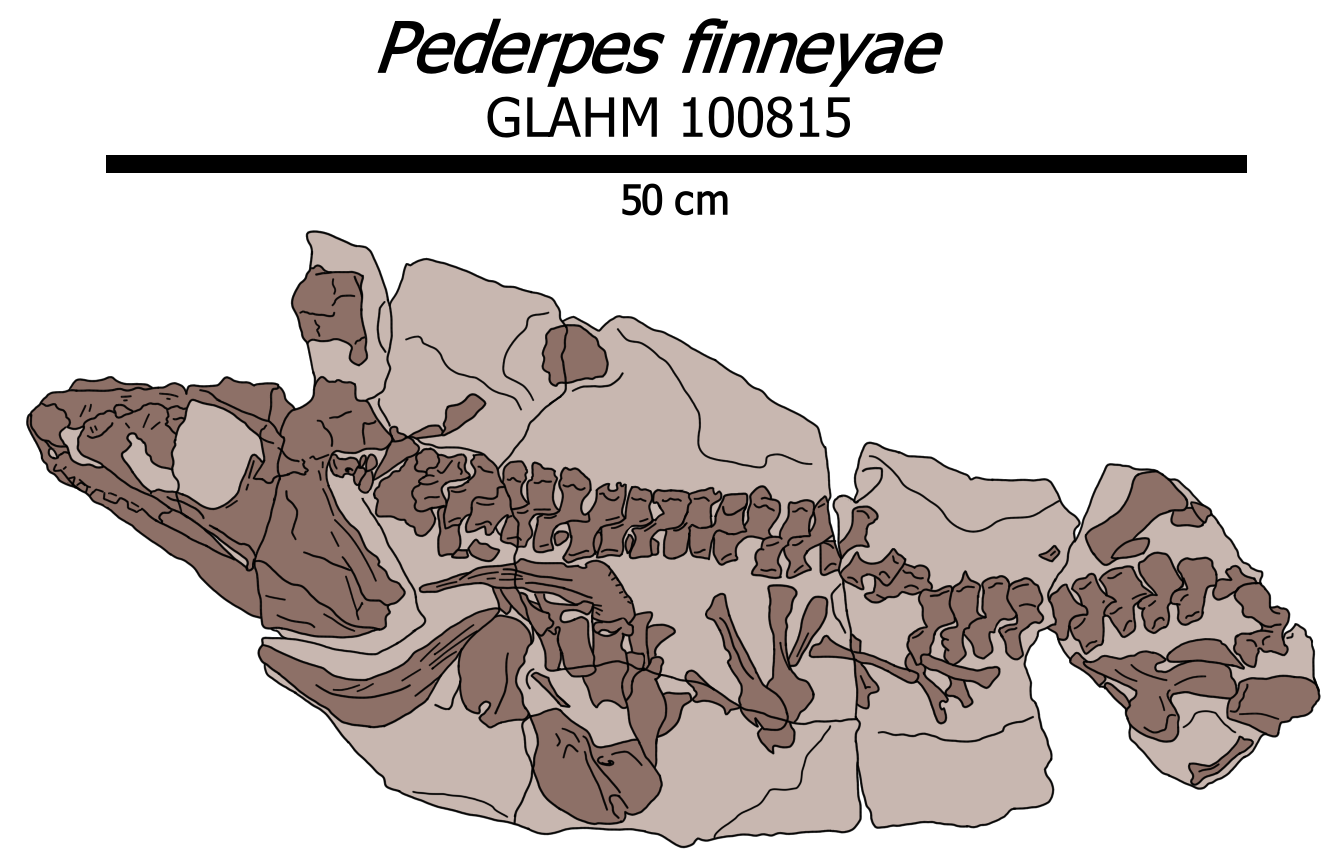
- Illustration of the holotype fossil slab

Scientific classification
- Domain: Eukaryota
- Kingdom: Animalia
- Phylum: Chordata
- Clade: Sarcopterygii
- Clade: Tetrapodomorpha
- Clade: Stegocephali
- Family: †Whatcheeriidae
- Genus: †Pederpes; Clack, 2002
- Species: †P. finneyae

Binomial name
- †Pederpes finneyae Clack, 2002

= Pederpes =

Pederpes Temporal range: Tournasian, Early Carboniferous 348–347.6 Ma

Extinct genus of tetrapods

Pederpes ("Peter's Foot") is an extinct genus of early Carboniferous stegocephalian, dating from 348 to 347.6 Ma in the Tournaisian age (lower Mississippian). Pederpes contains one species, P. finneyae, 1 m long.

This most basal Carboniferous stegocephalian had a large, somewhat triangular head, similar to that of later American sister-genus Whatcheeria, from which it is distinguished by various skeletal features, such as a spike-like latissimus dorsi (an arm muscle) attachment on the humerus and several minor skull features. The feet had characteristics that distinguished it from the paddle-like feet of the Devonian Ichthyostegalia and resembled the feet of later, more terrestrially adapted Carboniferous forms. Pederpes is the earliest-known tetrapod to show the beginnings of terrestrial locomotion and despite the probable presence of a sixth digit on the forelimbs it was at least functionally pentadactyl.

== Discovery and classification ==
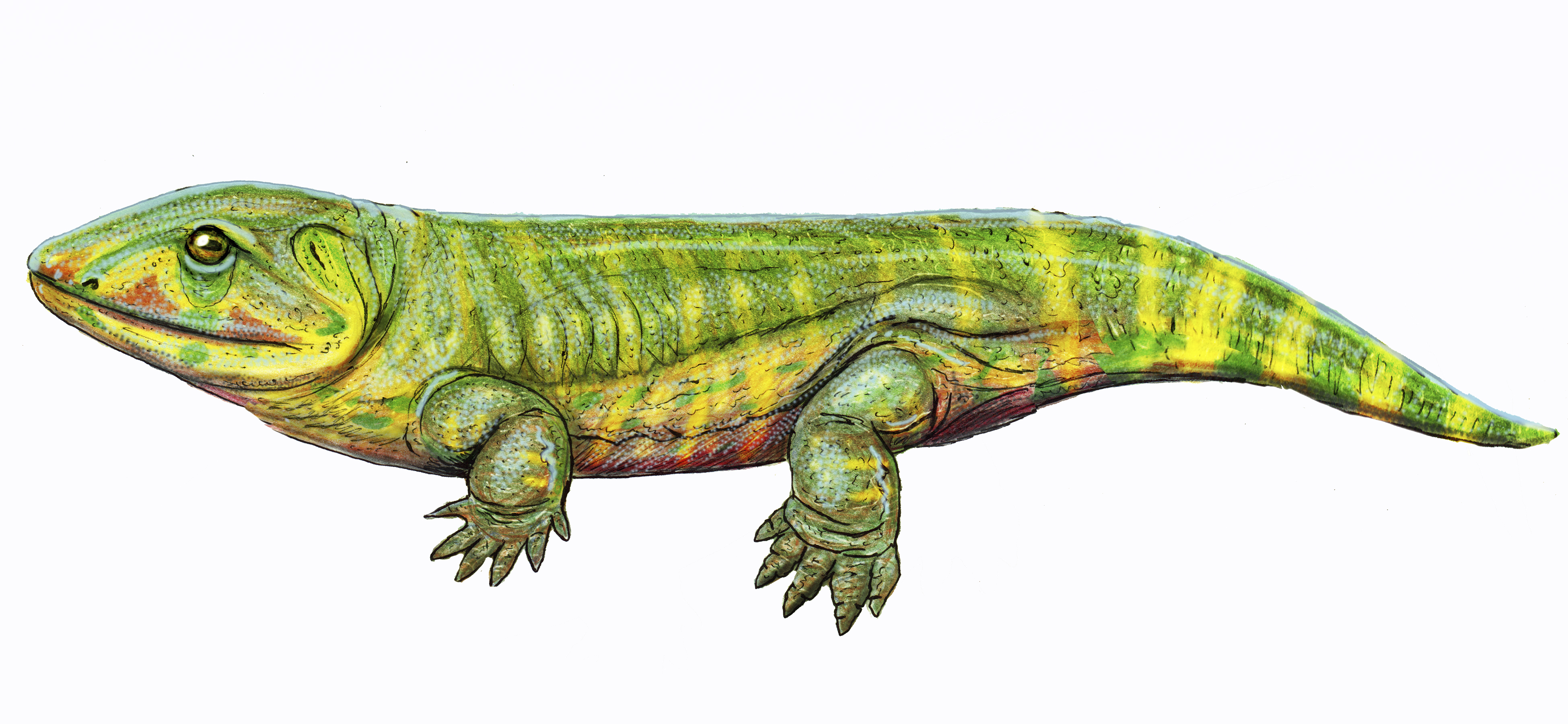
Life restoration

Pederpes was discovered in 1971 in central Scotland and classified as a lobe-finned fish. Its fossils were found in the Ballagan Formation. The type specimen was a nearly complete, articulated skeleton. Only the tail and some bones of the skull and limbs were missing. It was not until 2002 that Jennifer Clack named and reclassified the fossil as a primitive tetrapod.

Pederpes is placed in the family Whatcheeriidae, of uncertain relationships to other tetrapod families. While an amphibian in the broad sense, under cladistic taxonomy, Pederpes is not a member of the crown group amphibian in the meaning of modern amphibians. As a very basal (primitive) tetrapod, it falls under the traditional class Amphibia in Linnaean taxonomy.

Pederpes is an important fossil because it comes from the period known as Romer's gap and provides biologists with rare information about the development of tetrapods in a time when terrestrial life was rare.

The fossil was discovered in the Ballagan Formation, Inverclyde Group, claviger-macra (CM) palynozone (348 to 347.6 mya), Tournaisain Tn3c, Courceyan, Dinantian, Lower Carboniferous.

== Anatomy and lifestyle ==
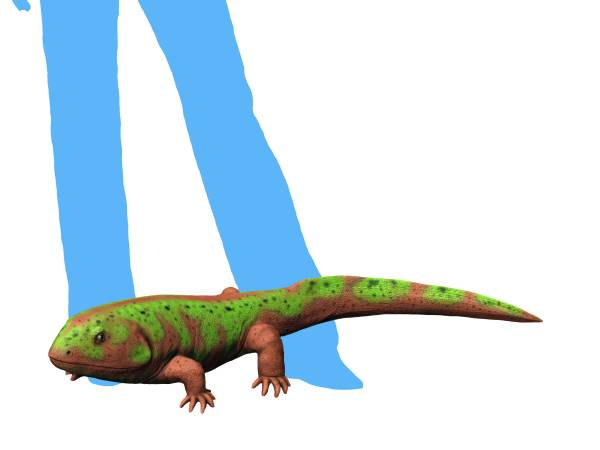
Life restoration of Pederpes finneyae with human legs for scale

Pederpes was 1 m long, making it average-sized for an early tetrapod.

The shape of the skull and the fact that the feet face forward rather than outward indicate that Pederpes was well adapted to land life. It is currently the earliest known fully terrestrial animal, although the structure of the ear shows that its hearing was still much more functional underwater than on land, and may have spent much of its time in the water and could have hunted there.

The narrow skull suggests that Pederpes breathed by inhaling with a muscular action like most modern tetrapods, rather than by pumping air into the lungs with a throat pouch the way many modern amphibians do.
