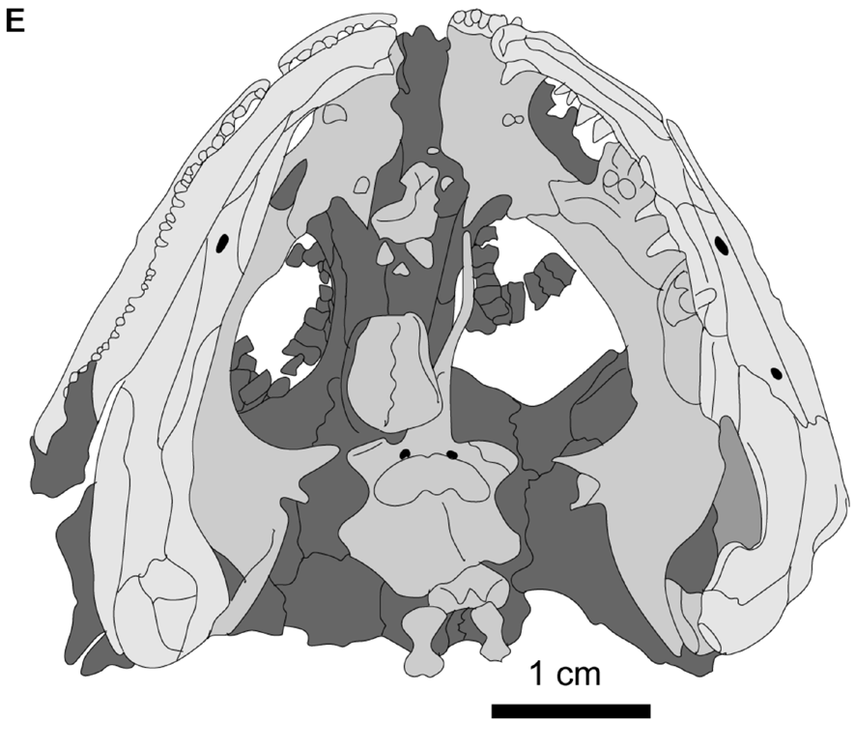
- Holotype skull diagram

Scientific classification
- Kingdom: Animalia
- Phylum: Chordata
- Clade: Tetrapoda
- Order: †Temnospondyli
- Family: †Dendrerpetontidae
- Genus: †Balanerpeton; Milner & Sequeira, 1994
- Species: †B. woodi

Binomial name
- †Balanerpeton woodi Milner & Sequeira, 1994

= Balanerpeton =

Balanerpeton Temporal range: Early Carboniferous Visean

Extinct genus of amphibians

Balanerpeton is an extinct genus of temnospondyl from the Visean stage of the Early Carboniferous in Scotland. The genus contains a single species, Balanerpeton woodi, known from complete specimens discovered in the East Kirkton Quarry. It represents the earliest known definitive temnospondyl, a group of tetrapods that possibly may have given rise to amphibians, though whether modern amphibians truly descended from temnospondyls remains contentious among researchers.

== Discovery and naming ==
Balanerpeton is the most common tetrapod in the East Kirkton Limestone of the East Kirkton Quarry assemblage in Scotland, with fossils assigned to this taxon by Milner and Sequeira in 1994 specifically found from units 52 to 86. The generic name, Balanerpeton, is derived from Ancient Greek words βᾰλᾰνεῖον (bălăneîon, "hot-spring" or "bath") and ἑρπετόν (herpetón, "creeping animal"). The specific epithet, woodi, is named in honor of Stanley Wood who discovered the fossils and first described them as a 'fossil amphibian' in 1985.

== Description ==
The largest known specimen of Balanerpeton is estimated up to 43.4 cm (17 in) in length, while other specimens are estimated around 17.5–33.6 cm (7–13 in). Characteristics of Balanerpeton include the presence of large external nares, large interpterygoid vacuities (holes in the back of the palate), and an ear with a tympanic membrane and rod-like stapes. The morphology of the stapes suggests that the animal was capable of hearing high-frequency sound. Balanerpeton does not possess lateral line sulci or an ossified branchial system. The principal method of respiration was probably buccal (gulping air through mouth) rather than costal (expanding chest volume to take in air), indicated by the small straight ribs. Adult specimens of Balanerpeton are probably terrestrial based on the pelvic girdle and forelimb morphology (shape), while larval stage juveniles likely lived in water similar to modern amphibians.

== Paleonenvironment ==
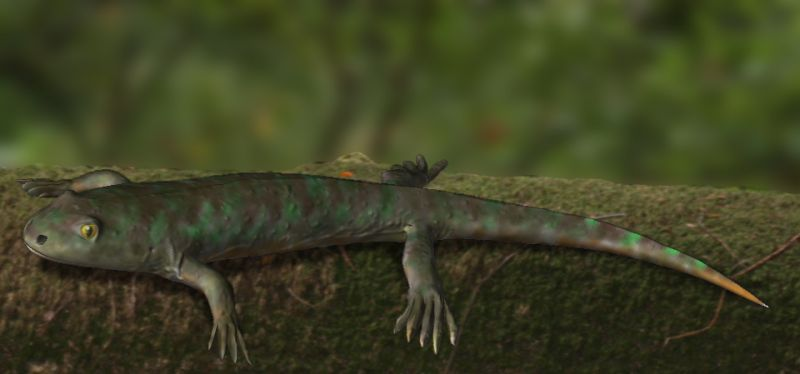
Life restoration

The East Kirkton Limestone (units 37-88) is deposited during the Visean stage of the Early Carboniferous, with specimens of Balanerpeton known from units 52 to 86. Units 66-88 are dated to 341 ± 3 million years ago based on zircon dating to estimate the maximum depositional age of unit 82, and other early tetrapod fossils known from unit 82 include Westlothiana, Silvanerpeton, Ophiderpeton, Eucritta, Kirktonecta and Termonerpeton. Fossils of the harvestman Brigantibunum, indeterminate myriapod, and large embolomere are also known from unit 82. The reptiliomorph Eldeceeon is known from unit 76. Arthropod cuticles including that of scorpions and eurypterids are known across various units of the East Kirkton Limestone. All eurypterid material from the East Kirkton Limestone are provisionally assigned to the semi-terrestrial Hibbertopterus, with the exception of two isolated combs assigned to Cyrtoctenus and isolated femur assigned to cf. Dunsopterus, which may represent synonymous taxa. Almost every scorpion material from the East Kirkton Quarry are provisionally assigned to the large terrestrial scorpion Pulmonoscorpius, including a large specimen (NMS G 1987.7.8) with an estimated total length of 70 cm (2 ft 4 in) from the East Kirkton Limestone, somewhere between units 59 and 63, which would have preyed on small tetrapods like Balanerpeton.
