= East Kirkton Quarry =

Geological site in Scotland

- Geologic site
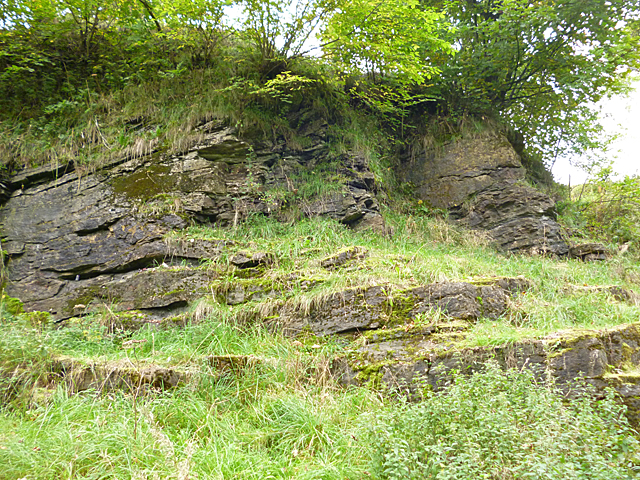
- An overgrown limestone outcrop at East Kirkton, 2013

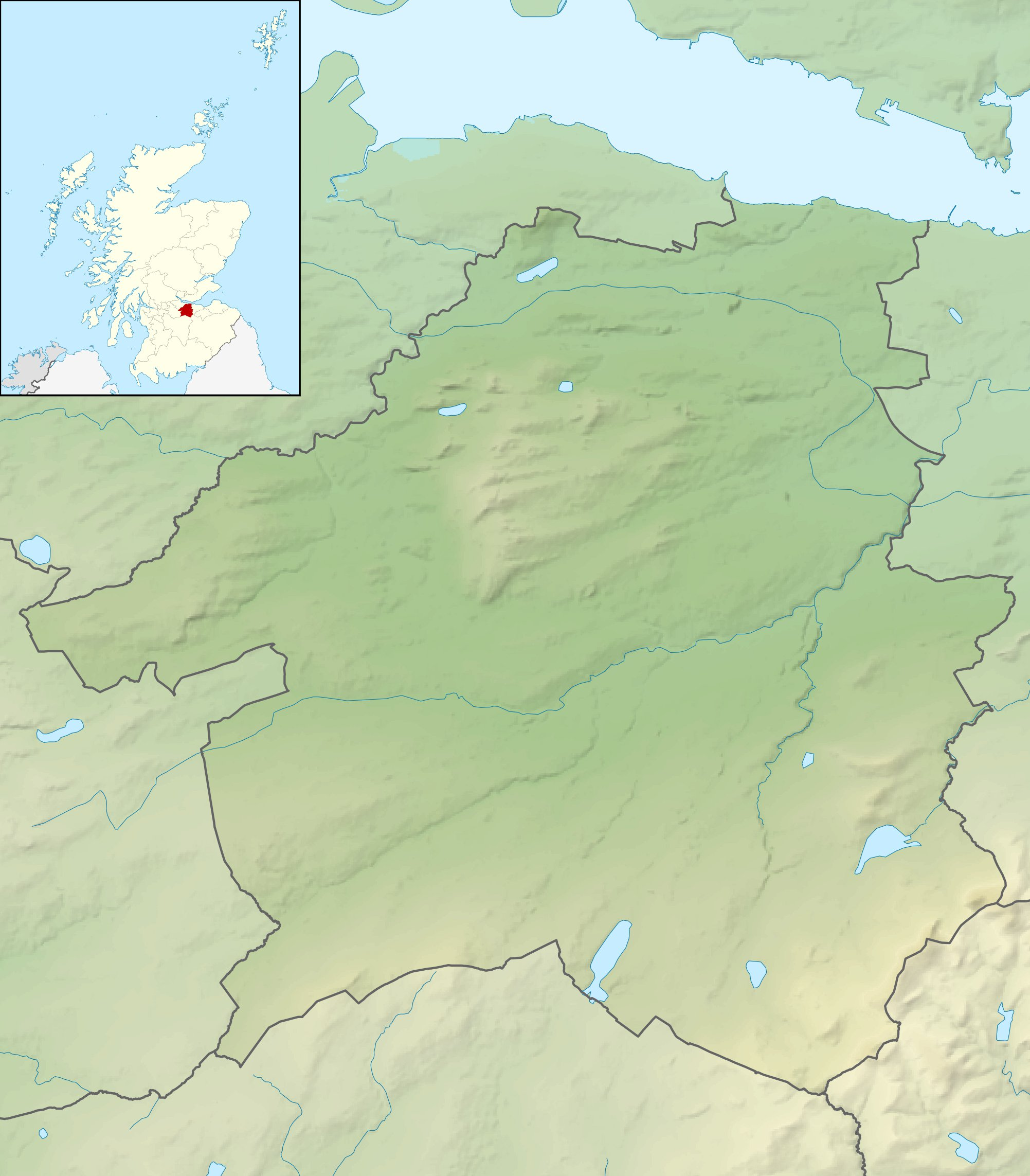
- Location within Scotland Location within West Lothian
- Coordinates: 55.903975°N 3.616536°W
- Location: Bathgate, West Lothian, Scotland, United Kingdom
- Age: Viséan, Carboniferous

East Kirkton Quarry, or simply East Kirkton, is a former limestone quarry in West Lothian, Scotland, now a renowned fossil site. The quarry is known for terrestrial and freshwater animal fossils; the most fossil-rich layer is dated to around 341 ± 3 million years ago, during the Viséan stage of the Mississippian subperiod (Early Carboniferous Period). The quarry is a 200-meter-long (~650 ft) depression located in the town of Bathgate. Geographically, it sits at the Bathgate Hills near the center of the Midland Valley, a fossil-rich region of southeast Scotland. The site is dominated by volcanic tuff, limestone, and silica deposits of large freshwater lakes associated with hot springs and local basaltic (high-iron) volcanism. Three geological intervals are exposed: the East Kirkton Limestone (oldest), Little Cliff Shale (middle), and Geikie Tuff (youngest).

The East Kirkton Limestone in particular has produced numerous well-preserved fossils of tetrapods (four-limbed vertebrates) and arthropods (multi-legged chitinous invertebrates like millipedes and arachnids). East Kirkton had been ignored by paleontologists since the 1840s, but Scottish fossil collector Stan Wood managed to procure the land in 1985, sparking a rush of scientific interest. New species from East Kirkton have been named on a regular basis since 1990, and nearly all of these species have been found nowhere else. Notable discoveries include Westlothiana (a tetrapod originally regarded as the oldest known reptile), Balanerpeton (a common early representative of amphibians in the group Temnospondyli), and Pulmonoscorpius (the largest known terrestrial scorpion). The East Kirkton area represents an unconventional environment: dry woodlands and mineral-rich lakes nestled among volcanic cinder cones. Aquatic animals, though not uncommon, are less diverse than those found in the swampy coal forests and coastal sediments prevalent at other Scottish Carboniferous fossil sites. The prevalence of terrestrial organisms represents a broader trend of decreasing reliance on an amphibious lifestyle during the Carboniferous Period.

== History ==
=== Early history (1825–1983) ===
As early as the 1820s, East Kirkton was noted to be an enigmatic site, relevant to broad debates on the nature of geological processes. In the late 18th and early 19th centuries, petrologists (geologists who study the formation of rocks) were split into two camps. Neptunists argued that most rocks precipitated out of mineral-rich waters, while plutonists identified magma as the medium from which most rocks originate. Experiments on carbonate-based rocks (such as limestone) supported neptunist interpretations of petrology, while evidence from silica-based rocks (such as granite) favored plutonist views. East Kirkton presented a contradiction: thick layers of carbonate (limestone) intermingled alongside rarer siliceous (chert) beds, emphasizing how both rock types can occur in close succession.

The first geologist to study the site was John Fleming (1825), a Scottish neptunist who considered both the carbonate and chert to be derived from heated groundwater. During the 1830s and 1840s, the quarry yielded some interesting fossils of Carboniferous plants and eurypterids ("sea scorpions", a type of extinct arthropod), though this was not uncommon for quarries in the area. English geologist Samuel Hibbert (1836) discussed Fleming's interpretation, identifying the limestone as freshwater due to the prevalence of plant fossils and the absence of marine fossils. He drew attention to the occurrence of volcanic tuff at the site, and attributed the silica and carbonate to hot spring mineralization.

When the quarry ceased operations in 1844, the site was, for the most part, forgotten as a geological footnote. Scottish geologist Archibald Geikie (1861) determined that the limestone of "Kirkton" was not a single unit, but instead two distinct sequences, one at the nearby West Kirkton quarry and the other at East Kirkton. He supported Hibbert's interpretation, considering the Kirkton quarries to represent large lakes influenced by hot springs on an ancient volcanic plain. East Kirkton saw little attention in the following decades, as neptunism diminished in most applications while plutonism established itself as a robust scientific theory. The land south of the quarry was developed for housing while the quarry sat abandoned. The prevailing view was that, with the exception of rare freshwater eurypterids, East Kirkton's fossil content was comparatively unremarkable. One notable study in the century since Geikie's paper was by Muir and Walton (1957), who reviewed previous research and investigated the carbonate's microscopic texture and origin in more detail.

=== Stan Wood's fossil discoveries (1984 – present) ===
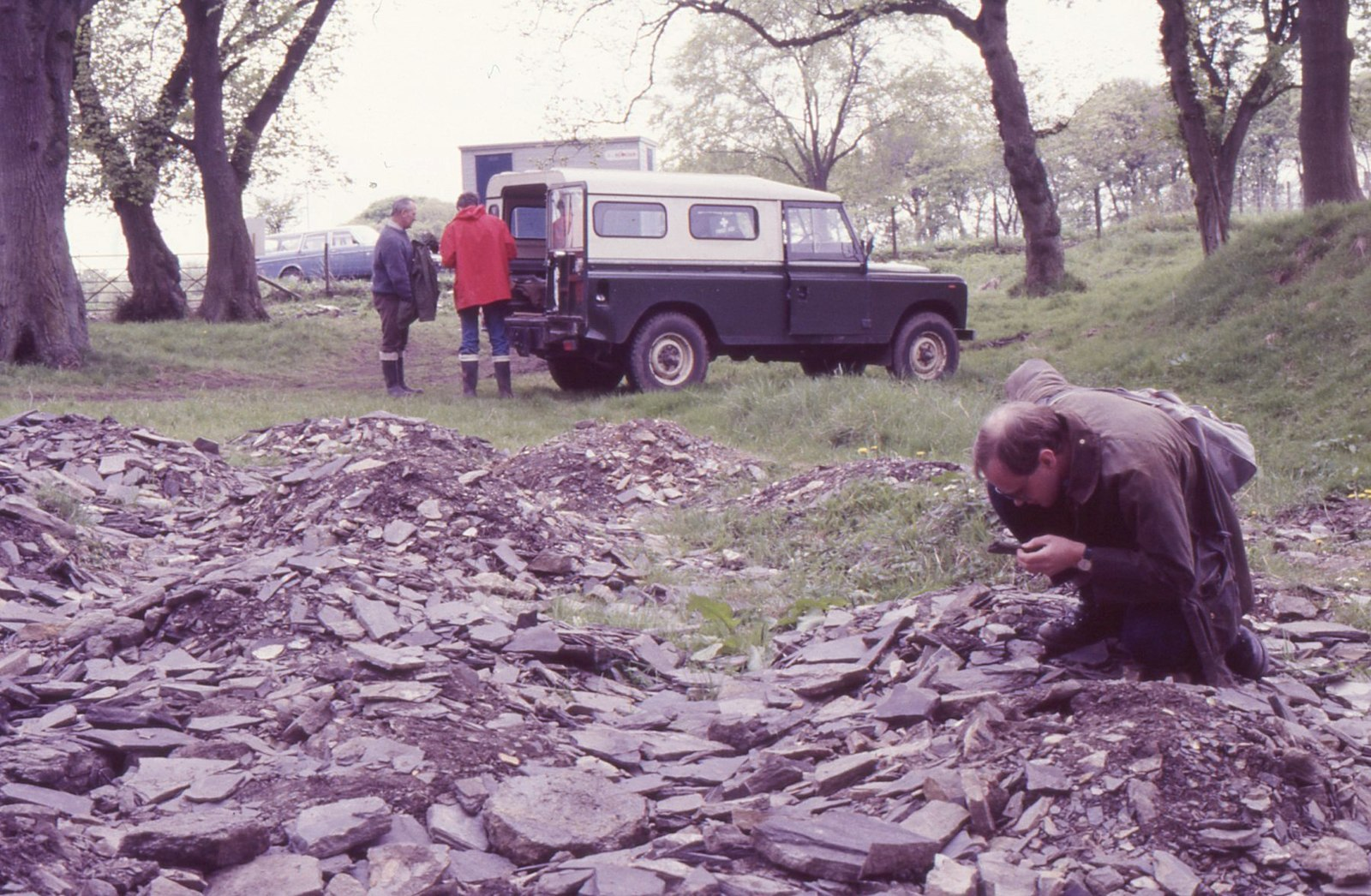
National Museums of Scotland geologists searching for fossils in the spoil heaps of East Kirkton, 1987

East Kirkton's decades of obscurity ended in 1984, when Scottish fossil collector Stan Wood discovered a fragmentary tetrapod skull among the limestone slabs of the quarry's spoil heap. According to popular accounts, he became aware of the spoil heap while refereeing a football match in a nearby field. Wood purchased the abandoned quarry from the West Lothian District Council the following summer. Wood and University of Cambridge paleontologist Timothy R. Smithson began systematic fossil collection from the quarry from 1985 to 1990. With news of the discovery, a team of National Museums of Scotland geologists (headed by W.D. Ian Rolfe) initiated a stratigraphic investigation in 1987–1992.

Fossils discovered by Wood include an expansive sample of both terrestrial and freshwater fossil arthropods and early amphibians from the East Kirkton Limestone. A smaller sample of fish and plant fossils were found in younger strata a few years later. Wood and his colleagues published on their initial finds in a 1985 Nature letter. Two notable taxa mentioned in the 1985 letter were the oldest known harvestman (a "daddy longleg", dubbed Brigantibunum in 2005) and the oldest known temnospondyl amphibian (described as Balanerpeton in 1993). East Kirkton is perhaps most famous for Westlothiana, a small tetrapod discovered in 1988 and initially reported to be the oldest known reptile in 1989. Wood's excavations at East Kirkton, and then-unnamed Westlothiana, were featured in the first episode of Lost Worlds, Vanished Lives, a 1989 BBC documentary hosted by Sir David Attenborough. Westlothiana was subsequently reinterpreted as a stem-amniote reptiliomorph. In other words, it was considered an amphibian closely related to amniotes (the group containing dry-adapted tetrapods like reptiles and mammals, with reinforced eggs and thickened skin). Thanks to its degree of completeness, Westlothiana is still among the best paradigms of the amphibian-amniote transition. A 2026 study even argued that Westlothiana was a stem-tetrapod, diverging from amniotes even further back than living amphibians.

East Kirkton was the main subject of a conference hosted by the Royal Society of Edinburgh in 1992. The conference produced a series of over 20 papers published in 1993–94 as "Volcanism and early terrestrial biotas" (volume 84, issues 3–4 of Earth and Environmental Science Transactions of the Royal Society of Edinburgh). New species have continued to be described from Wood's collections and other expeditions up to the present day. In 2011, Cambridge paleontologist Jennifer A. Clack named a new species of East Kirkton microsaur, Kirktonecta milnerae, in honour of the site. East Kirkton Quarry has been designated as both a Local Geodiversity Site (LGS) of West Lothian and a Site of Special Scientific Interest (SSSI).

== Geology ==
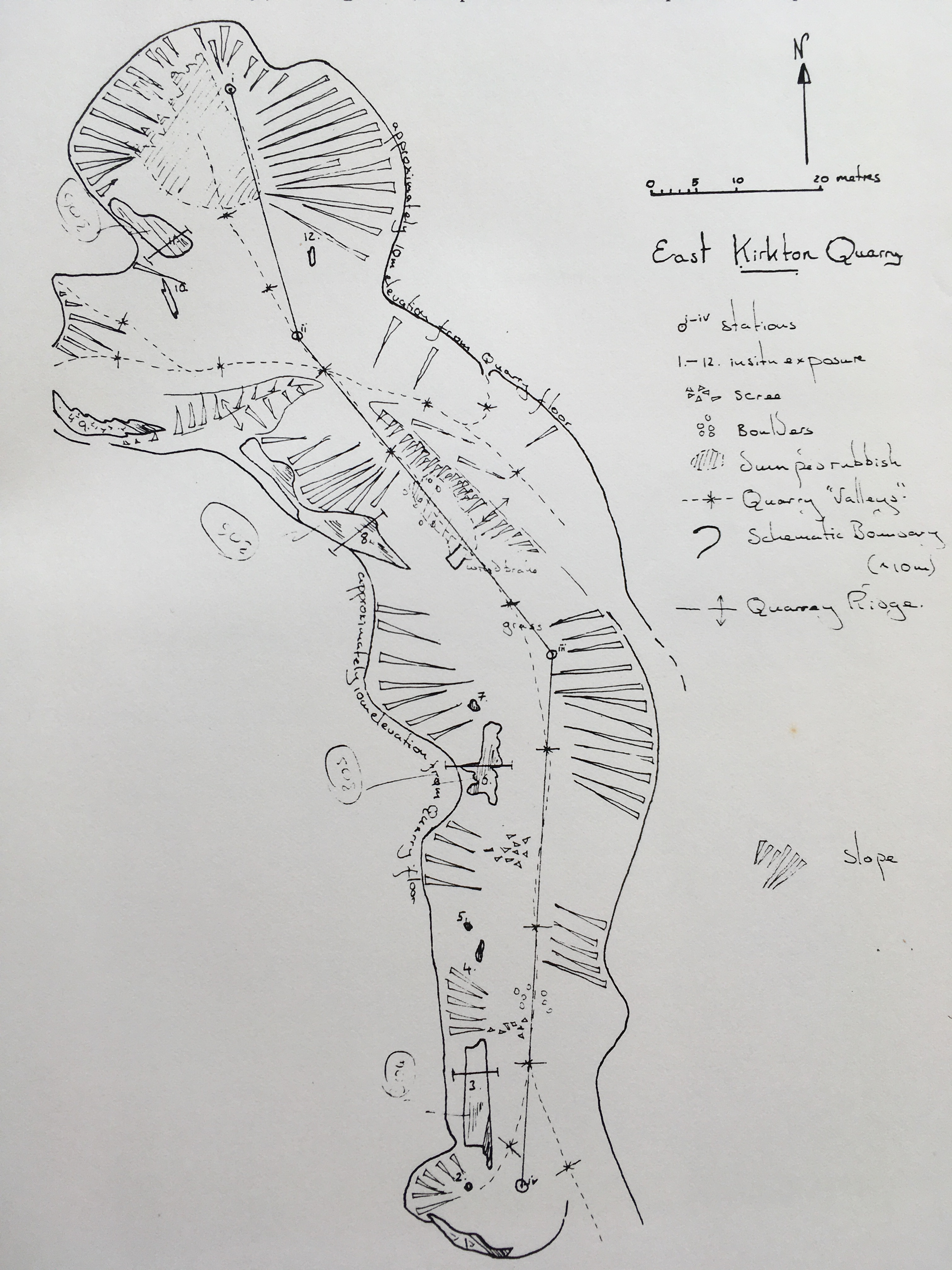
freehand field-sketch of East Kirkton Quarry, August 1983 showing outcrop transects of field work

The East Kirkton Quarry preserves up to 19 m (62 ft) of strata from the mid-lower part of the Bathgate Hills Volcanic Formation. It is equivalent in time to rocks from the upper part (Hopetoun Member) of the West Lothian Oil-Shale Formation, exposed north of Linlithgow. Both formations are part of the broader Strathclyde Group (informally termed the Oil-Shale Group) found throughout the Midland Valley of Scotland.

By comparison to equivalent oil shale strata, the East Kirkton was traditionally estimated to belong to the Brigantian (uppermost substage of the Viséan global stage) in the Mississippian Subperiod, the lower part of the Carboniferous Period). This would place it near the end of the regional Dinantian stage, between 330 and 338 million years old. U-Pb and Pb-Pb radiometric dating from unit 82 instead suggest an older estimate, up to 341 ± 3 million years old. This would place it into the Holkerian or Arundian substage (early-middle Viséan).

East Kirkton is one of many geographically restricted limestone deposits cropping out on a north-south tangent between Bathgate and Linlithgow. The nearby West Kirkton Quarry is a slightly younger marine limestone deposit. West Kirkton failed to produce any significant fossils, as it had been filled in and redeveloped by the time Stan Wood began his excavations in 1985.

The rocks of East Kirkton dip (tilt) into the west wall of the quarry. Magnetometer and resistivity surveys reveal a small north-south fault just west of the quarry. Vertical displacement of strata along the fault would have been responsible for bringing fine-grained sediments to the surface. The fault indicates that the localized nature of the site is a consequence of modern tectonic processes rather than ancient restricted deposition.

Three distinctive geological intervals can be found at the quarry: the Geikie Tuff (youngest / highest), Little Cliff Shale (middle), and East Kirkton Limestone (oldest / lowest). The most well-exposed area is a 15 m (49 ft) thick outcrop at the northwest edge of the quarry. Here, the three intervals are subdivided further into a series of thin units, labelled 1 to 88 from the top of the outcrop (the youngest point) to the bottom of the outcrop (the oldest point).

=== Geikie Tuff ===
The Geikie Tuff (units 1–31), as the name implies, consists mainly of yellowish-green volcaniclastic tuff. Fossils, though abundant in a few layers, are limited in diversity and preservation. They mainly include fish scales, plant fragments, and shells of ostracods (tiny bivalved crustaceans). Ironstone nodules are also present. The Geikie Tuff is more than 4 m (13 ft) thick at the main outcrop, though it can reach 8 m (26 ft) thick in exploratory boreholes. Stratigraphic sections acquired via boreholes have demonstrated that the tuff is overlain by basalt.

Pseudomorphs of olivine and plagioclase crystals indicate that the tuff is basaltic in nature. The volcanic grains are coarse and rounded, sorted into discontinuous lenticular layers with graded bedding. This suggests that the volcanic material was not directly supplied by a pyroclastic flow, base surge, or ash fall. Rather, it was washed down as debris from older ash deposits, settling underwater alongside wood and other non-volcanic fragments. The area most likely experienced small intermittent cinder cone eruptions, providing basaltic ash or lava as a predecessor to the tuff material.

=== Little Cliff Shale ===
The Little Cliff Shale (units 21–36) is the thinnest interval exposed at the site. It reaches its greatest thickness (about 1.85 m or 6.07 ft) near the middle of the quarry's west wall. The sediments of the Little Cliff Shale include blue-gray shale interspersed with greenish tuff. Fossils and ironstone are more common than in the Geikie Tuff, with the addition of scorpion cuticle and a greater diversity of plant and fish remains.

=== East Kirkton Limestone ===
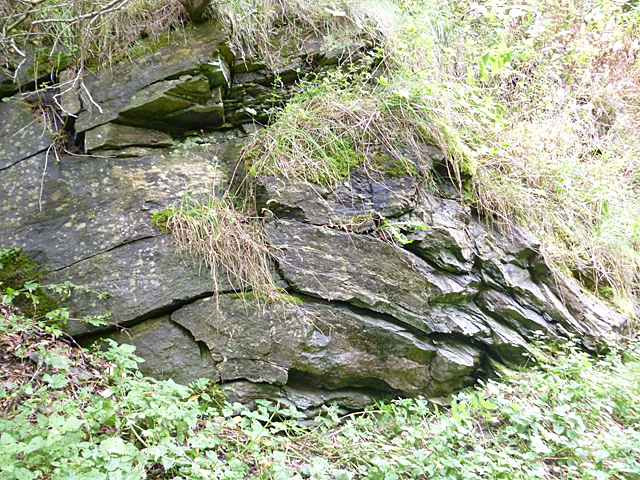
A slumping feature in an outcrop of the East Kirkton Limestone

The East Kirkton Limestone (units 36–88) is by far the thickest, most fossiliferous, and most geologically diverse sequence in the quarry. Most layers are laminated (thinly layered) limestone, with a fine-grained texture of calcareous spherulites (bead-like grains). Black Shale, coarse tuffaceous limestone, silica (chert and chalcedony), pyrite, gypsum, and tuff beds may occur in some layers. Tetrapod, arthropod, and plant fossils are abundant throughout the limestone. Conversely, fish are absent beyond unit 36 and ostracods are mostly restricted to black shale-bearing horizons. Many laminated beds are deformed or warped, and stromatolitic crusts and algal filaments are common. Small slumping features can be seen in some layers, likely corresponding to the slope between shallow and deep parts of a lake bed. The lake bed was probably oxygen-deprived, according to trace metal geochemical markers and an absence of bioturbation (animal-mediated disturbance). The true thickness of the limestone is unknown, but about 9 m (30 ft) are exposed on the main outcrop.

Stable isotope data help to pin down the origin of minerals like silica and pyrite in the limestone. Hydrogen and oxygen isotope ratios indicate that the chert beds precipitated from meteoric water heated to around 60 °C (140 °F), with a minor amount of mineral recycling after deposition. Sulfur molecules in pyrite are rather lightweight, arguing that crystal formation was mediated by bacterial activity. Yet the pyrite was also heavy enough to imply a constant supply of sulfur-34, likely from older gypsum beds heated by magmatic activity. Both the silica and pyrite support historical interpretations of a hydrothermal influence on the East Kirkton Limestone. Another hypothesis, based on strontium isotope trends, is that heat and alkaline groundwater are byproducts of chemical reactions between tuff minerals and carbon dioxide molecules seeping in via meteoric water (such as rain). Geochemical analysis supports a combination of hydrothermal, volcanic, detrital, and marine influences on the geology of the site.

Contrary to earlier suggestions, the calcareous minerals of East Kirkton Limestone (mostly calcite) are probably not directly hydrothermal in origin. Nevertheless, East Kirkton is a useful model for the formation of spherulite-rich freshwater limestone in volcanic settings. Most limestones with spherulites are dependent on a high proportion of clay particles, but clay makes up only a small portion of the East Kirkton Limestone. The prevailing interpretation is that spherulite formation at East Kirkton follows a complex mineralization pathway.

In the reconstructed sequence of spherulite formation, freshwater lakes are supplied with high concentrations of dissolved alkaline minerals and microbial acids. These conditions encourage the precipitation of fibrous calcite, which accumulates on strands of organic material such as algae or cyanobacteria In the shallow part of a lake. The fibrous calcite acts as a base for radiating balls of botryoidal (lumpy) calcite. Even once the algae die and settle, the calcite continues stacking up into crusts and domes on the lake bed. Fluctuating mineral concentrations lead to constant corrosion and reprecipitation of the calcite. Wave action breaks up the calcite crusts into smaller grains, which are periodically washed into deeper parts of the lake. This periodic supply of spherulite grains is responsible for the laminated appearance of the limestone, alternating between microscopic bands of dark clay and organic material, and thicker (though still narrow) bands of calcite. Diagenesis (underground heat and pressure) fractures and warms the calcite after deposition, introducing voids and further reprecipitation within the molds of algal strands.

== Palaeoenvironment ==
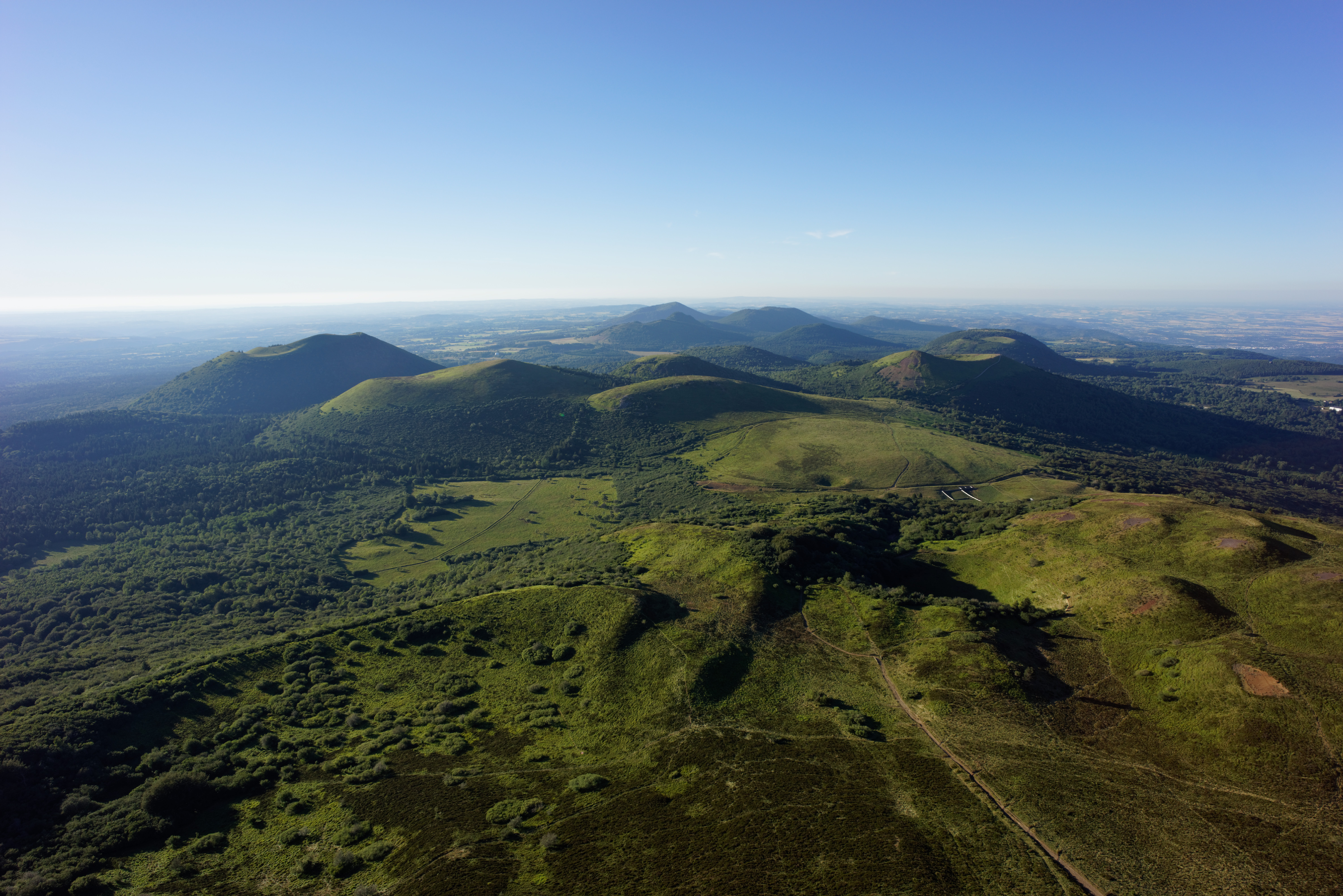
Chaîne des Puys in France, a volcanic field comparable to the original environment of the East Kirkton Quarry

During the Dinantian, the Midland Valley would have been a subtropical lowland rift zone. Faults and cooled lava flows would have contributed to the landscape by diverting rivers and damming lakes, as would the progradation of deltaic systems further east. Some of the lakes may have filled in volcanic craters, forming low crater lakes (also known as maars). Most individual volcanoes were small but numerous, emphasizing basaltic and phreatic eruptions alongside hot springs. Modern equivalent environments include the system of volcanoes around the Mozambique Channel and the Chaîne des Puys in France.

Towards the north and east was a large lake or estuary system known to geologists as Lake Cadell. It was responsible for the deposition of most sediments comprising the West Lothian Oil-Shale Formation. An expanse of dry volcanic uplands were located west of East Kirkton. These uplands, formally known as the Clyde Plateau, completely lacked any form of limestone deposition. The East Kirkton Limestone was deposited at a time and place at the intersection between these two environments, as the expanding dry plateau began to displace the brackish lake, enabling the development of a riparian ecosystem in the Bathgate area.

East Kirkton was located close to the equator in the Viséan. The climate was warm and semi-arid, gradually becoming wetter as the Carboniferous progressed. Rainfall was prevalent enough to support woodlands and lake ecosystems, but infrequent enough to dissuade coal forests and allow gypsum deposition. The more humid conditions of the Geikie Tuff may correspond to the expansion of a larger lake into the East Kirkton area. Chert and pyrite, alongside permineralized plant fossils, may indicate that hot springs were prevalent during the deposition of the East Kirkton Limestone.

== Paleobiota and paleoecology ==
Color key: Taxon / Reclassified taxon / Taxon falsely reported as present / Dubious taxon or junior synonym / Ichnotaxon / Ootaxon / Morphotaxon

Notes
Uncertain or tentative taxa are in small text
~~crossed out~~ taxa are discredited.

=== Tetrapods ===
East Kirkton tetrapod fossils have all been preserved in aquatic sediments of the East Kirkton Limestone. A majority of the fossils come from laminated spherulitic limestone slabs (units 70 and below), though the best-preserved specimens come from a thin black shale layer (unit 82). Fish fossils do not occur alongside tetrapod fossils, suggesting that the tetrapods lived in or around shallower bodies of water than those supporting the local freshwater fish.

The tetrapod species of East Kirkton are all endemic, though some broader groups (dendrerpetontids, aistopods, "anthracosaurs", etc.) can be found at other Carboniferous locales. Notably absent are adelogyrinids, Crassigyrinus, Doragnathus, and lysorophians, all of which are considered fully aquatic. The absence of lysorophians could be explained by the age of East Kirkton, which is much older than the known aquatic members of the group. True amniotes are also absent, and only a single microsaur fossil has been discovered. The rarity of microsaurs may be due to geographic rather than environmental factors, since few fossils of the group are known from other British sites. Overall, East Kirkton has a more terrestrial character than other Scottish fossil sites, though a few aquatic or semi-aquatic species certainly inhabited the area as well.

Tetrapods of East Kirkton
Genus / Taxon	Species	Strata	Material	Notes	Images
Balanerpeton	B. woodi	East Kirkton Limestone (Units 52-86)	Over 30 specimens, including skulls and nearly complete skeletons	A medium-sized terrestrial temnospondyl similar to Dendrerpeton. One of the oldest known crown-group tetrapods, especially if Westlothiana is interpreted as a stem-tetrapod.	
Eldeceeon	E. rolfei	East Kirkton Limestone (Unit 76)	Four partial skeletons, two of which are nearly complete	A medium-sized "anthracosaur" with proportionally large hindlimbs and proposed terrestrial habits. Initially identified as an unnamed "Eoherpeton"-like form.	
Embolomeri	Indeterminate	East Kirkton Limestone (Unit 82)	Skull fragments (pterygoid, quadratojugal, lower jaw)	A large indeterminate embolomere with an estimated skull length of 20 cm (7.8 inches), the largest reported for a Mississippian embolomere.	
Eucritta	E. melanolimnetes	East Kirkton Limestone (Unit 82)	Four partial skeletons and an isolated skull roof	A small baphetoid with a mosaic of features from other tetrapod groups. Initially identified as an unnamed loxommatid.	
Kirktonecta	K. milnerae	East Kirkton Limestone (Unit 82)	Single nearly complete skeleton	A very small newt-like aquatic microsaur, with soft tissue of a deep tail fin.	
Ophiderpeton	O. kirktonense	East Kirkton Limestone (Unit 82)	Five partial skeletons, including skull material	A small aistopod, a type of snake-like legless tetrapod.	
Silvanerpeton	S. miripedes	East Kirkton Limestone (Unit 82)	Nine partial skeletons, including skull material	A small "anthracosaur" with short limbs.	
Westlothiana	W. lizziae	East Kirkton Limestone (Unit 82)	One nearly complete skeleton	A small, slender tetrapod. When the holotype specimen, "Lizzie", was discovered in 1988, it was reported to be the oldest known reptile (or, more precisely, the oldest known amniote). Subsequent studies reinterpreted it as a stem-amniote, a close relative to lepospondyls, or a stem-tetrapod.	
Temnospondyli	Indeterminate	East Kirkton Limestone	Isolated ribs	A large (~2-meter, 6.6 feet) indeterminate temnospondyl, possibly related to Edops.	
Termonerpeton	T. makrydactylus	East Kirkton Limestone (Unit 82)	Single partially articulated posterior torso	A large "anthracosaur"-like tetrapod with a foot similar to Eldeceeon and amniotes.	

=== Fish ===
Though few of East Kirkton's fish species have been formally described, fossils from units 26 to 38 suggest that the East Kirkton lake hosted a diverse freshwater ecosystem. Body types seen in East Kirkton fish include fusiform (tuna-shaped) generalist predators and deep-bodied durophages (Eurynotus). The fish fauna is comparable to other sites in the Mississippian Oil Shales of Scotland. Only the Granton Shrimp Bed, a fully marine environment, lacks freshwater fish and tetrapods.

Beside direct body fossils of fish, coprolites are also found in several layers near the Little Cliff Shale-East Kirkton Limestone transition. Small pellet- bullet- and cigar-shaped coprolites are common, often containing ostracod shells, and in one case, bone fragments. One irregular mass, containing ostracods and plant fragments, may be a regurgitate. Elongated spiralling coprolites are rarer and would have been produced by elasmobranchs akin to modern sharks. Irregular or strand-like coprolites may have been produced by tetrapods, though fish cannot be excluded. Massive clusters of phosphatized grains were probably produced by large omnivorous eurypterids like Hibbertopterus, or less likely large rhizodont fish.

==== Bony fish ====
Bony fish (Osteichthyes) of East Kirkton
Genus / Taxon	Species	Strata	Material	Notes	Images
Actinopterygii	Unnamed	East Kirkton Limestone (Units 37-38), Little Cliff Shale (Units 32-36), Geikie Tuff (Units 26-29)	Numerous isolated scales, four partial skeletons (two of which may be juveniles), and an isolated maxilla	At least five different unnamed species of actinopterygians (ray-finned fish), labelled A to E. Comparable to "Rhadinichthys" (species A and B), Elonichthys (juveniles), Mansfieldiscus (species C), Mesopoma (species D), and Cosmoptychius (species E).	
Eurynotus	E. sp.	East Kirkton Limestone (Unit 37), Little Cliff Shale (Units 34-36)	Five specimens, including a semi-complete skeleton	A platysomid actinopterygian with a fairly deep body and durophagous diet. Up to 9.6 cm (3.8 inches) long, not counting the head or tail-fin.	
Rhizodontida	Indeterminate	Little Cliff Shale (Unit 36)	A patch of scales	A large predatory rhizodont, possibly up to 5 m (16.4 feet) in length.	

==== Cartilaginous fish ====
Cartilaginous fish (Chondrichthyes and Acanthodii) of East Kirkton
Genus / Taxon	Species	Strata	Material	Notes	Images
Acanthodidae?	Indeterminate	Little Cliff Shale (Unit 36), Geikie Tuff (Units 26-29)	Three specimens: a disarticulated skeleton and fragments of a fin spine and pectoral girdle	A tiny acanthodiform similar to Acanthodes, Acanthodopsis, or Howittacanthus.	
Climatiidae?	Indeterminate	Geikie Tuff (Unit 31)	Single bony plate	A possible late-surviving climatiid similar to Climatius.	
Diplodoselache	D. woodi?	East Kirkton Limestone (Unit 37), Little Cliff Shale (Units 35-36)	Three teeth	A xenacanth "shark" (elasmobranch).	
Tristychius	T. arcuatus?	East Kirkton Limestone (Unit 37), Little Cliff Shale (Units 32-36)	Fin spines (two complete and six fragmentary) up to 4 cm (1.6 inches) in length	A hybodont "shark" (elasmobranch).	

=== Invertebrates ===
Apart from arthropods, other identified invertebrates include freshwater ostracods (Carbonita) and bivalves (Curvirimula?). Ostracods likely formed the base of the aquatic food chain, since they have been found as stomach contents in several fish and tetrapod fossils.

Arthropods of East Kirkton
Genus / Taxon	Species	Strata	Material	Notes	Images
Brigantibunum	B. listoni	East Kirkton Limestone (Unit 82)	Single compressed partial specimen	A small harvestman (Opiliones) with very long thin legs, possibly a member of the suborder Eupnoi. The oldest known harvestman when first discovered in 1985, though older fossils have been discovered since then.	
Cyrtoctenus	C. sp.	East Kirkton Limestone	Two isolated combs	The largest specimen measures 220 mm (8.7 in) long. Possibly a junior synonym of Hibbertopterus or a distinct taxon.	
cf. Dunsopterus	cf. D. sp.	East Kirkton Limestone	Isolated femur	The femur measures 53 mm (2.1 in) long. Possibly a junior synonym of Hibbertopterus or a distinct taxon.	
Hibbertopterus	H. scouleri	East Kirkton Limestone	Partially articulated specimens and isolated fragments	A massive semi-terrestrial hibbertopterid eurypterid, with a carapace up to 65 cm (26 inches) in diameter. All eurypterid material from the East Kirkton Limestone are provisionally referred to Hibbertopterus, with the exception of two isolated combs assigned to Cyrtoctenus and isolated femur assigned to cf. Dunsopterus, which may represent synonymous taxa.	
Myriapoda	Unnamed	East Kirkton Limestone (Units 47-82)	Multiple specimens, six of which are complete enough to describe	At least three species of many-legged arthropods, including a possible glomeridesmid (slug millipede), another millipede with ozopores (scent glands), and a putative non-millipede myriapod.	
Pulmonoscorpius	P. kirktonensis	East Kirkton Limestone (holotype from unit 47 and other referred specimens from various units), Little Cliff Shale (Unit 34.4)	16 complete specimens and hundreds of cuticle fragments	The largest terrestrial scorpion known, with almost all scorpion material from the East Kirkton Quarry provisionally assigned to this taxon. The largest specimen, estimated up to 70 cm (2 ft 4 in), is from the East Kirkton Limestone, somewhere between units 59 and 63. Two distinctive specimens from units 42-47 may represent additional species of Pulmonoscorpius. Initially reported as Gigantoscorpio.	
Scorpionida	Indeterminate	East Kirkton Limestone, Little Cliff Shale	Cuticle fragments	At least two species of indeterminate scorpions, including an aquatic "archaeoctonoid" and a terrestrial "orthostern". One piece of scorpion cuticle apparently sheltered a mite.	

=== Plants ===
The plant fossils of East Kirkton are fragmentary but diverse, and small fragments of fusain (fossilized charcoal) are common in the East Kirkton Limestone. The area was likely forest or open woodland frequented by wildfires. There are few aquatic plants apart from algal laminations, and lycopsid fragments (an indicator of swamp forests) are only common in the Geikie Tuff. The surrounding woods were probably drier during the deposition of the Little Cliff Shale and East Kirkton Limestone. The East Kirkton flora is fairly typical among Viséan Scotland, most species found here have been reported previously from the Midland Valley.

Gymnosperm wood and fern leaves (particularly Spathulopteris and Sphenopteridium) are the most common plant fossils at East Kirkton. These plants are also abundant at Weaklaw, a Viséan-age volcanic ash deposit in East Lothian. It is uncertain whether this similarity betrays a preference for volcanic areas or simply broader biostratigraphy.

Plant fossils have been fossilized through several different chemical pathways. In the East Kirkton Limestone, robust plant parts such as gymnosperm branches and Stigmaria roots are often preserved by permineralization (petrification). During permineralization, the original organic material is sequentially replaced with silica and/or carbonate carried by alkaline groundwater. More commonly, heat and pressure compresses organic matter into carbonaceous films. These coalified compressions of wood and foliage can be found in practically every layer of the site. Some fossils are both compressed and permineralized, particularly in the upper layers (units 44–48) of the East Kirkton Limestone.

==== Gymnosperms ====
Gymnosperms of East Kirkton
Genus / Taxon	Species	Strata	Notes
Bilignea	B. solida	East Kirkton Limestone	Woody gymnosperm stems or branches up to 3.5 cm (1.4 inches) in diameter.
Eristophyton	E. fasciculare	East Kirkton Limestone	Common woody gymnosperm branches up to 6 cm (2.4 inches) in diameter.
Lyginorachis	L. kingswoodense	East Kirkton Limestone	Gymnosperm stems.
Lyginorachis	L. spp.	East Kirkton Limestone	Gymnosperm stems.
Pitus	P. withamii	East Kirkton Limestone	Woody arborescent (tree-sized) gymnosperm trunks up to 50 cm (20 inches) in diameter.
cf. Protopitys	cf. scotica		An isolated progymnosperm branch.
Stanwoodia	S. kirktonensis	East Kirkton Limestone	Woody gymnosperm stems or branches up to 3 cm (1.2 inches) in diameter.

==== Lycopsids ====
Lycopsids of East Kirkton
Genus / Taxon	Species	Strata	Notes
Lepidocarpon	L. wildianum		Fragmentary lycopsid cones.
Lepidodendron	L. sp.	Little Cliff Shale, Geikie Tuff	Fragmentary lycopsid trunks.
Lepidophloios	L. sp.	East Kirkton Limestone	Fragmentary lycopsid stems.
Lepidophylloides	L. sp.		Fragmentary lycopsid leaves.
Lepidostrobus	L. sp.	Little Cliff Shale	Fragmentary lycopsid cones.
Lycopsida		East Kirkton Limestone, Little Cliff Shale	Lycopsid leaves and sporophylls referable to Lepidophyllum, Cyperites and Lepidostrobophyllum.
Stigmaria	S. sp.	East Kirkton Limestone, Geikie Tuff	Fragmentary lycopsid roots.

==== Ferns ====
Ferns of East Kirkton
Genus / Taxon	Species	Strata	Notes
Adiantites	A. antiquus	East Kirkton Limestone	Fern frond fragments.
Adiantites	A. macahenkii	East Kirkton Limestone	Fern frond fragments.
Archaeopteridium	A. cf. tschermakii	East Kirkton Limestone	Fern frond fragments.
Botryopteris	B. cf. antiqua		Small fern stem fragments.
Diplothmema	D. sp.	East Kirkton Limestone	Fern frond fragments.
Rhodea	R. gigantea	East Kirkton Limestone	Large common fern fronds.
Rhodea	R. sp.	East Kirkton Limestone	Large common fern fronds.
Spathulopteris	S. decomposita	East Kirkton Limestone	Common fern fronds, leaves, and pinnules.
Spathulopteris	S. dunsii	East Kirkton Limestone	Common fern fronds, leaves, and pinnules.
Spathulopteris	S. obovata	East Kirkton Limestone	Common fern fronds, leaves, and pinnules.
Sphenopteridium	S. crassum	East Kirkton Limestone	Common fern fronds, leaves, and pinnules.
Sphenopteridium	S. pachyrrachis	East Kirkton Limestone	Common fern fronds, leaves, and pinnules.
Sphenopteris	S. affinis	East Kirkton Limestone, Little Cliff Shale	Common fern leaves and pinnules.
Sphenopteris	S. clavigera	East Kirkton Limestone	Common fern leaves and pinnules.
Sphenopteris	S. cf. fragilis	East Kirkton Limestone	Common fern leaves and pinnules.

==== Horsetails ====
Horsetails of East Kirkton
Genus / Taxon	Species	Strata	Notes
Archaeocalamites	A. sp.		Fragmentary sphenopsid (horsetail) stems.
Sphenopsida	Indeterminate	East Kirkton Limestone	Horsetail stems, leaves, and cones.

== See also ==
- List of Sites of Special Scientific Interest in Edinburgh and West Lothian
- Ballagan Formation
