= Stan Wood (fossil hunter) =

Scottish fossil hunter

Stanley Purdie Wood
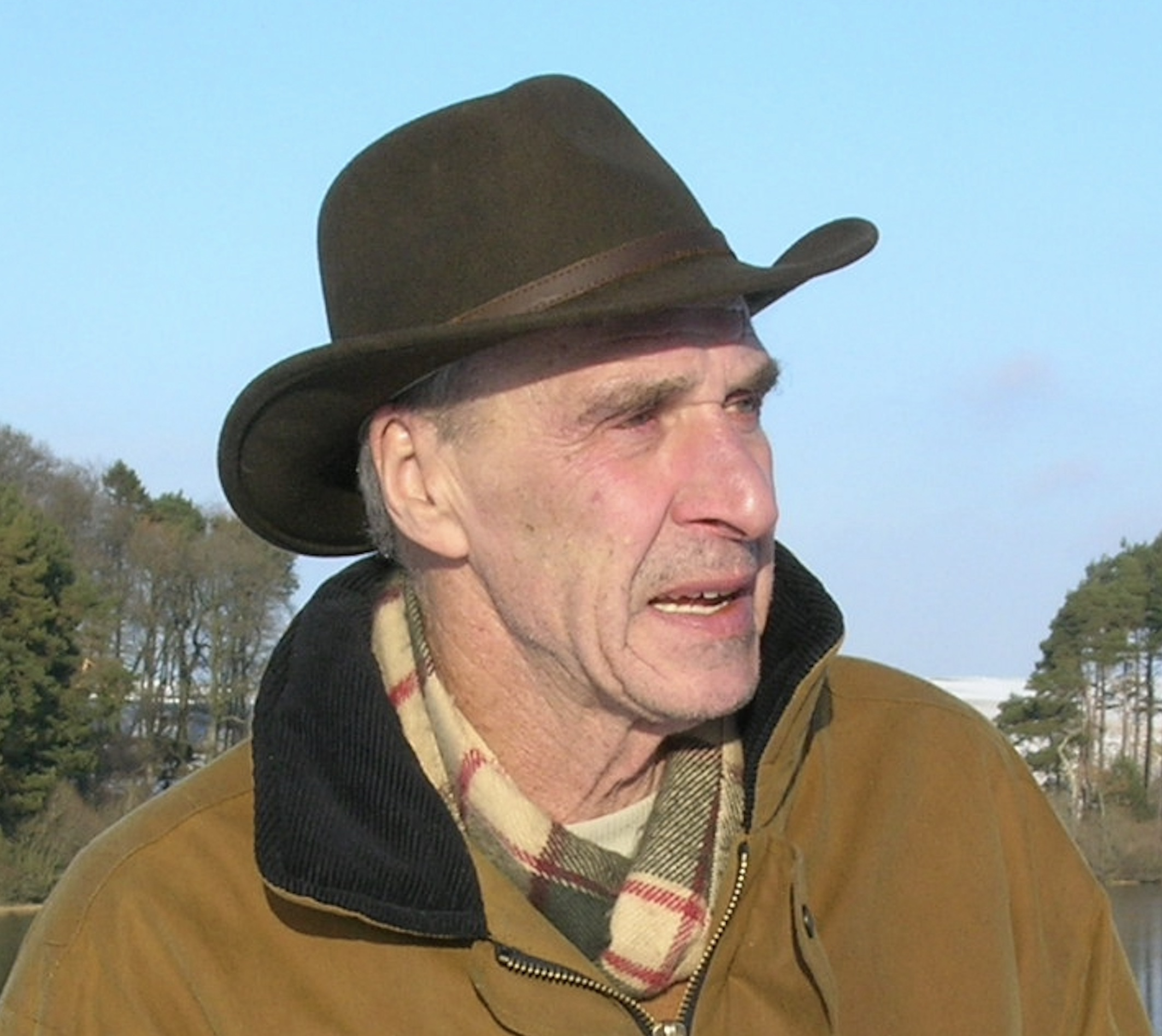
- Stan Wood, Selkirk 2009, courtesy of Maggie Wood
- Born: Stanley Wood; 23 December 1939; Edinburgh, Scotland
- Died: 9 September 2012 (aged 72)
- Education: Geology (Open University)
- Occupation: Fossil collector
- Years active: 1969 - 2012
- Notable work: Discovery of Westlothiana
- Spouse: Margaret
- Awards: Worth Prize (1984); BBC Enterprise Award (1986); Marsh Award (2009)

Stan Wood was a British self-taught fossil hunter known for his significant fossil discoveries including 28 species of arthropods, fish and tetrapods, most notably the supposed "earliest reptile" Westlothiana.

== Early life ==
Born Stanley Wood in Edinburgh, 1939, Wood left school aged 14 to work as a dockyard apprentice at Leith Harbour during a period of severe economic hardship, when Leith had acquired the reputation as one of the roughest neighbourhoods in post-war Britain. Wood could put his hand to many things and served in the Merchant Navy as an engineering officer for a time, before being assigned to work for Brown Brothers, an engineering company. He was encouraged to consider white-collar work and changed career to sell insurance with the Prudential.

== Fossil hunting ==
As a boy, Wood had been fascinated by Roman Britain, and was convinced that he could calculate the existence of "missing" Roman forts along the Antonine Wall but it wasn't long before he discovered he could also find "missing" fossil fish from rock strata even closer to home. At the age of 29, with no training but with a natural enthusiast's eye for detail, Wood spent two years scouring the Wardie coastline for fossils but with no success. He made contact with the Royal Scottish Museum and found out that he had been looking at the wrong rock-type. Lesson learned, Wood started to build his own carefully curated collection of fossil fish. He trained himself to recognise the signs for the presence of fossil fish at outcrop by visiting localities made famous by nineteenth century fossil hunters. This paid off with his first significant discovery in 1971 and over the next few years, he amassed a valuable collection, which he sold to the museum, supplementing his income as an insurance salesman.

In 1974, Wood struck out at a new locality when he read that a new opencast coal mine was planned in Fife, convincing the National Coal Board to allow him on site to hunt for fossils. The following year, he uncovered a rich bone bed at the mine, which contained the first Carboniferous tetrapods to be discovered in the UK for almost 100 years. Wood convinced the contractor to interrupt their work and carefully strip a layer over 600 m^{2}, bagging more than three tons of bone bed over a few weeks. The resultant research material included rare discoveries, initiated a string of new Ph.Ds from Newcastle University, which gave Wood the recognition he needed to initiate projects at scale with research funding. Crucially, Wood was able to sell enough of what he found to break from selling insurance and become a full-time fossil hunter. Fully committed, Wood curated his own specimens by working as a technician in the vertebrate paleontology group of Dr Alec Panchen of Newcastle University, completing a geology degree with the Open University, and securing work on a new site on the Scottish Borders, (Note: at Foulden) which created a series of research initiatives published in twelve scholarly papers in 1985.

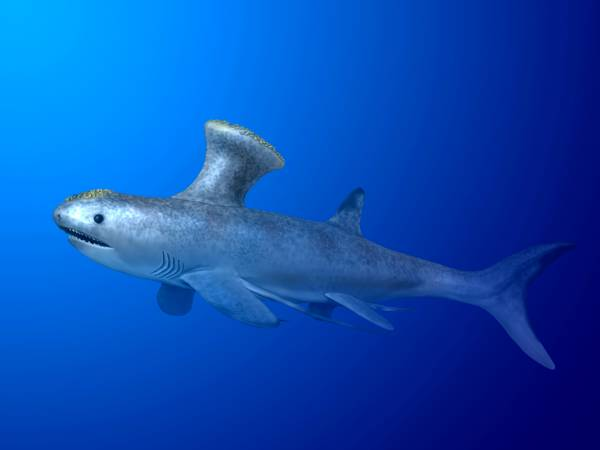
The Bearsden Shark, Akmonistion zangerli

Once Wood had identified fossil-rich strata in a specific locality, he would follow through at scale, inspiring others to participate and research his finds, which attracted funding for new, sometimes ambitious projects to uncover new discoveries. In 1982, Wood had moved with his family to a housing estate at Bearsden and almost immediately uncovered rare fish remains from a burn running through the estate. Wood alerted the neighbouring Hunterian Museum (Note: which initiated a long working relationship with the museum championed by its deputy Director at the time, Dr Ian Rolfe) and persuaded the local council, the estate residents and local youth groups to join him in a huge muddy dig, which led to the discovery of the metre long "Bearsden shark" (Akmonistion), regarded as the most complete skeleton of a Carboniferous shark ever found. Wood was awarded the prestigious Worth Prize at the Geological Society of London in 1983, and remains part of the community of Bearsden. In the same year, Wood became "Stan, Stan the Fossil Man" in a BBC Television documentary about him, receiving the BBC Enterprise Award presented to him by Prince Charles in 1986, and appearing a few years later alongside David Attenborough in the BBC series Lost Worlds, Vanished Lives.

=== East Kirkton ===
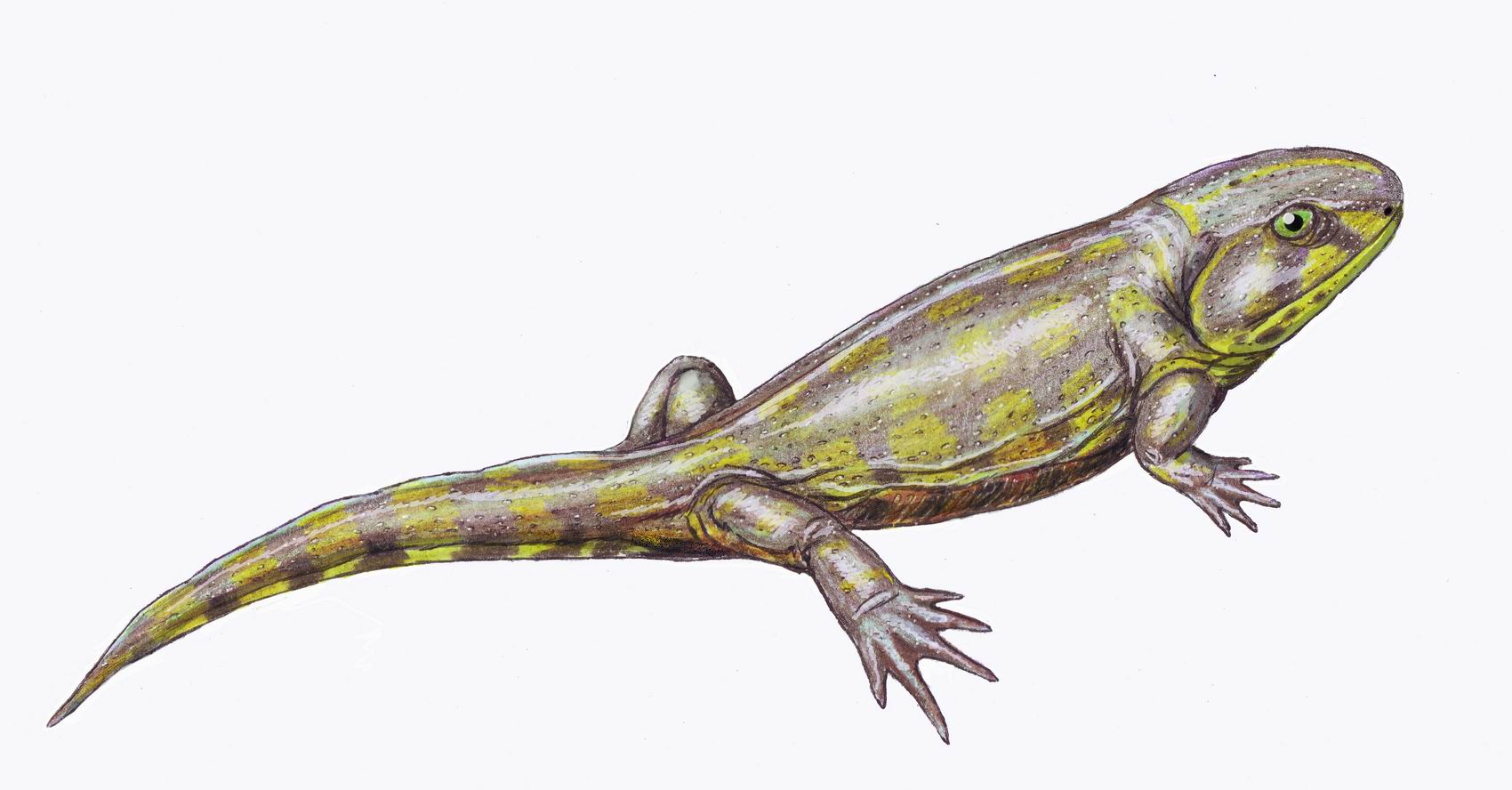
Eucritta, also discovered at East Kirkton Quarry

Life restoration of Westlothiana

Arguably Wood's greatest single discovery came in 1984, when he opened up an abandoned Victorian quarry in East Kirkton near Bathgate. The quarry revealed an abundance of fossil marine and terrestrial arthropods, along with examples of several classes of fish and early amphibians.

Ever mindful of commercial opportunity, in 1986, Wood exhibited his large collection on tour, (Note: “Mr Wood’s Fossils" was mounted/assembled by the Hunterian Museum with support from the British Museum (Natural History) under the supervision of Ian Rolfe. The specimens came from Wood's excavations, on loan from various museums he had sold them to.) opened by David Attenborough, entitled "Mr. Wood's Fossils" and hosted by three museums across the UK. The following year, Wood opened a fossil shop in Edinburgh by the same name, which is still trading today.

The most important single discovery Wood made at East Kirkton a tetrapod nicknamed "Lizzie", a small lizard-like animal (Westlothiana), historically suggested to be the oldest known reptile, though this view is now considered erroneous.

Wood demanded £180,000 (£445,121 adjusted for inflation) as a sale price for "Lizzie", which took UK museums by surprise due to the very high asking price relative to the £40,000 (£98,916 adjusted for inflation) they had expected to pay, and were unable to afford Wood's asking price. In April 1989, an agreement of sale at the £180,000 asking price was made with the State Museum of Natural History Stuttgart which on the museum's part was an attempt to avoid the specimen falling into a private collection. Following Wood making an application to the Export of Works of Art Committee to approve the fossil's export, the committee, in its first ever review of a fossil specimen, made a recommendation to delay the export of the fossil by 4 months. This was however overruled by the British Government, who stated that as a fossil and not a human artefact, that export control legislation related to artefacts did not apply to it. By February of 1990, Stuttgart Museum had agreed to delay the sale of the fossil until the end of July to allow the possibility of finding funding for the fossil to stay in the UK. The fossil was purchased by the National Museums Scotland around August 1990 following a public appeal, which raised £195,500 (£483,451 adjusted for inflation) in total to purchase the specimen.

East Kirkton was subsequently leased by Wood and systematically excavated by a dedicated research team from the Hunterian Museum. Their combined efforts were presented at a conference of the Royal Society of Edinburgh in 1992 and compiled in twenty-eight papers, considered by the scientific community as a major milestone in the understanding of the evolution of the earliest known community of land animals and plants on the planet.

== Later years and legacy ==
Wood opened up another old quarry previously considered to have been "spent", (Note: The exposure of the fossilifeous beds in the river at Glencartholm was exhausted. Wood believed they would be found deep underground further up-stream. After excavating a big hole he was proved right) at Mumbie, finding Lower Carboniferous arthropods and Devonian fish.

All of Wood's excavations were Scottish sites, most often within easy reach of where he happened to be living at the time. Many were of sites previously discovered by Victorian fossil hunters. By far the most important new site of Wood's was the major excavation he undertook in the bed of Whiteadder Water at Willie's hole near Chirnside. For two years between 2008 and 2009 he recovered an extensive fauna of arthropods, fish and tetrapods. (Note: One animal that Stan discovered is called Mesanerpeton woodi which means 'wood's intermediary crawler' and has provided a new insight into the early development of walking in early tetrapods) In 2009, in recognition of his work, Wood received the Marsh Award for palaeontology, particularly for his work in inspiring young palaeontologists at the beginning of their careers.

Site	Dates	New species	Collection
Wardie	1969-1973	1	National Museums of Scotland
Dora	1974-1976	2	National Museums of Scotland
Foulden	1979-1981	2	National Museums of Scotland
Bearsden	1981-1983	9	Hunterian Museum of Glasgow & National Museums of Scotland
East Kirkton	1984-1992	10	Cambridge Museum of Zoology & National Museums of Scotland
Mumbie	1981-1983	1	Natural History Museum & National Museums of Scotland
Tantallon	1999	0	
Burnmouth	2006	2	Cambridge Museum of Zoology
Whitrope Burn	2006	3	National Museums of Scotland
Willie’s Hole	2008-2012	4	Cambridge Museum of Zoology & National Museums of Scotland

In 2011, Wood was diagnosed with terminal cancer. Using a wheelchair, Wood concentrated his efforts focused at end of the Devonian from a new excavation site at Jedburgh and then returning to his collection of raw field-specimens from Mumbie. In a career that spanned more than forty years, Wood registered more than 5,500 specimens, discovered thirty-four new species, (Note: twenty-five of which were completely new genera) eight of them named after him. Six years after his death, a Special Issue of the Earth and Environmental Science Transactions of the Royal Society of Edinburgh was published as a tribute to Wood. It had been thought that 350 million years ago, life on earth was restricted by low oxygen levels. Wood's discoveries have revealed this to be false, and that there was indeed a diverse fauna of tetrapods and arthropods living on land at the time. His excavations at Willie's Hole supplied substantial new material for resarch. In 2022, the Palaeontological Association instituted the ‘’’Stan Wood Award’’’ for projects in vertebrate palaeontology, ideally involving fieldwork and fossil collecting.
