= Gigantoscorpionidae =

Gigantoscorpionidae Temporal range: Devonian–Carboniferous, 383.7–342.8 Ma

Scientific classification
- Kingdom: Animalia
- Phylum: Arthropoda
- Subphylum: Chelicerata
- Class: Arachnida
- Order: Scorpiones
- Suborder: †Holosternina
- Superfamily: †Gigantoscorpionoidea; Kjellesvig-Waering, 1986
- Family: †Gigantoscorpionidae; Kjellesvig-Waering, 1986

Genera
- Gigantoscorpio; Petaloscorpio

Synonyms
- †Petaloscorpionidae Kjellesvig-Waering, 1986

Extinct family of scorpions

Gigantoscorpionidae is an extinct family of scorpions that lived between 383.7 million and 342.8 million years ago, during the Devonian and Carboniferous periods. The family is the only member of the superfamily Gigantoscorpionoidea.

== Genera ==
The family contains two genera:

- Gigantoscorpio Størmer, 1963
- Petaloscorpio Kjellesvig-Waering, 1986
