= Gigantoscorpio =

Gigantoscorpio Temporal range: Carboniferous, Middle Mississippian (Visean)

Scientific classification
- Kingdom: Animalia
- Phylum: Arthropoda
- Subphylum: Chelicerata
- Class: Arachnida
- Order: Scorpiones
- Family: †Gigantoscorpionidae
- Genus: †Gigantoscorpio; Størmer, 1963
- Species: †G. willsi

Binomial name
- †Gigantoscorpio willsi Størmer, 1963

Extinct species of scorpion

Gigantoscorpio willsi is an extinct species of scorpion known from the Visean age of the Carboniferous. It is larger than modern scorpions, with estimated an total length of around 28–44 cm (11–17 in).

== Discovery and naming ==
Its type specimen is BMNH In. 42706a,b, In. 42707, which is a 3D body fossil of its exoskeleton found in "Calciferous sandstone", Glencartholm Volcanic Member, Upper Border Group, Dumfriesshire, Scotland. Three other specimens (GSE 2134, GSE 2137 and GSE 2174) from the same type locality were previously referred to this genus, but subsequent analyses disagreed with this referral and reclassified them as indeterminate scorpions, possibly large specimens of other scorpions like Centromachus and Anthracochaerilus. The specific epithet "willsi" was established after Dr. Leonard J. Wills from the University of Birmingham. Specimens that were assigned to Gigantoscorpio cf. willsi from the Ballagan Formation, Foulden, Scotland, were later assigned to Trachyscorpio squarrosus.

== Description ==
The type specimen of G. willsi consists of a prosoma (cephalothorax), some tergites of the mesosoma, pectines (comb-like sensory appendages), pedipalps with chelae, and walking legs, with the chelicerae, metasoma (the so-called "tail") and telson, which would bore the stinger, not preserved.

Gigntoscorpio was an extremely large scorpion compared to modern species. Based on the incomplete holotype, it was initially estimated at 36.5 cm (14.4 in) or 28–42 cm (11–17 in) long, but subsequently estimated to be 39–44 cm (15–17 in) long. While incomplete, the leg specimen GSE 2174 could be assigned to a scorpion that is almost double the size of the holotype, but it cannot be reliably assigned to this species.

Its prosoma is subquadrate, pointed along the anterior margin. While it had two median eyes on small cylindrical raised disc, it lacked lateral eyes, even though the majority of other Paleozoic scorpions like Pulmonoscorpius had them, with them being present in the latter as compound eyes. The pedipalps are long and slender, and its long claws have inner rows of denticles, with some denticles on the surface. The pectines are large and triangular with a broad base, bearing about 60 long and curved teeth.

Gigantoscorpio was initially not assigned to a family. In 1986, the superfamily Gigantoscorpionoidea and family Gigantoscorpionidae were created, only containing this genus. In 1993, Petaloscorpionidae, which include Petaloscorpio, is synonymized with this family.

== Paleoecology ==
Gigantoscorpio is found in the Glencartholm Volcanic Member along with other scorpions like Archaeoctonus glaber, Pseudoarchaeoctonus denticulatus, Centromachus euglyptus, Anthracochaerilus palustris, Eskiscorpio parvus, Loboarchaeoctonus squamosus, and indeterminate scorpions that were previously assigned to Gigantoscorpio and Trachyscorpio.

The type specimen of G. willsi preserved some of the microorganisms that preyed on the soft tissue of the decaying scorpion. This includes bacteria in the class Actinomycetes (Polymorphyces and Anthracomyces), fungi, nematodes (Scorpiophagus baculiformis and S. latus), and some problematica.
