= List of Sites of Special Scientific Interest in Edinburgh and West Lothian =

The following is a list of Sites of Special Scientific Interest in the Edinburgh and West Lothian Area of Search, in Scotland.

- Agassiz Rock, Blackford Quarry
- Arthur's Seat
- Balerno Common
- Blawhorn Moss
- Calderwood
- Carriber Glen
- Cobbinshaw Moss
- Cobbinshaw Reservoir
- Craigengar
- Duddingston Loch
- East Kirkton Quarry
- Firth of Forth
- Hermand Birchwood
- Hermand Quarry
- Inchmickery
- Linhouse Valley
- Linlithgow Loch
- Lochcote Marsh
- Petershill
- Philpstoun Muir
- Skolie Burn
- Tailend Moss
- Wester Craiglockhart Hill

== See also ==
- List of SSSIs by Area of Search
