= Tantallognathus =

Tantallognathus Temporal range: late Tournaisian-early Visean

Scientific classification
- Domain: Eukaryota
- Kingdom: Animalia
- Phylum: Chordata
- Clade: Sarcopterygii
- Clade: Tetrapodomorpha
- Clade: Stegocephali
- Genus: †Tantallognathus; Chen et al., 2018

Type species
- †Tantallognathus woodi Chen et al., 2018

Extinct genus of tetrapodomorphs

Tantallognathus is an extinct genus of four-limbed vertebrate (tetrapod in a broad sense) from the Mississippian of Scotland. It is based on a small jaw fragment which shows similarities to Crassigyrinus, baphetids, and crown group tetrapods. This fossil was found near Tantallon Castle (namesake of the genus), and the species name honors famed Scottish fossil collector Stan Wood. Tantallognathus is one of the most advanced tetrapods found in the Ballagan Formation, a geological unit known for a diverse fauna of stegocephalians. Like other Ballagan Formation vertebrates, it helps to clarify a pulse of tetrapod evolution during Romer's gap, a time interval when fossils of tetrapods and their relatives are otherwise very rare.
