= Lost Worlds, Vanished Lives =

- 2004 DVD box cover by 2 Entertain
- Genre: Documentary television
- Written by: David Attenborough
- Presented by: David Attenborough
- Theme music composer: Terry Oldfield
- Composer: Terry Oldfield
- Country of origin: England
- Original languages: English, Spanish
- No. of series: 1
- No. of episodes: 4

Production
- Executive producer: Mike Salisbury
- Producers: Mike Salisbury, Neil Nightingale
- Cinematography: Graham Frake
- Editor: Colin Cradock
- Camera setup: Stephen Bolwell, Jim Harris
- Production companies: BBC Bristol, TBS

Original release
- Network: BBC Two
- Release: 23 April – 14 May 1989

Related
- The First Eden (1987); The Trials of Life (1990)

Lost Worlds, Vanished Lives is a 1989 four-part BBC documentary series concerning the discovery of fossils. It is written and presented by David Attenborough, produced by Mike Salisbury, and was originally broadcast on BBC Two in April 1989. It was co-produced by TBS and aired on that channel in April 1991. Lost Worlds, Vanished Lives was made between the second and third installments of Attenborough's Life series: The Living Planet and The Trials of Life, respectively. The study of rocks and their ancient secrets was something of a boyhood passion for David Attenborough. In this series, his enthusiasm for the subject is undiminished. With the help of expert palaeontologists, fossil hunters and (for the time) modern animation techniques, Attenborough attempts to show how life evolved in Earth's distant past. To do so, he travels the globe to visit the world's most famous fossil sites.

== Release ==
2 Entertain published the series on DVD (catalog number BBCDVD1466) on 27 September 2004.

== List of episodes ==
No.	Title	Original release date
1	"Magic in the Rocks"	23 April 1989
A picture of prehistoric life emerges, as Attenborough unearths several major clues in the form of fossilised remains that were undiscovered for millennia. Locations Dorset Coast Dominican amber Petrified Forest National Park Illinois Basin East Kirkton Quarry Animals Ammonites Tyrannosaurus Westlothiana Onychodus oreodonts
2	"Putting Flesh on Bone"	30 April 1989
Attenborough explores vanished lives of prehistoric creatures and using the latest evidence, scientists reconstruct a pterodactyl in the form of a model aircraft—to see if such a beast could indeed have flown. Animals Ichthyosaurs Arthropleura (identifided as giant millipede) Trilobites Pterosaurs Pteranodon Quetzalcoatlus
3	"Dinosaur"	7 May 1989
Attenborough visits several museums of natural history. With the aid of dinosaur skeletons, he demonstrates how they existed in real life, and speculates about the reasons for their sudden demise. Animals Giraffatitan (identified as Brachiosaurus) Seismosaurus (identified as Diplodocus) Stegosaurus Allosaurus Hadrosaurs Triceratops Tyrannosaurus Ornithomimus Struthiomimus Apatosaurus Brontosaurus
4	"The Rare Glimpses"	14 May 1989
Four famous locations that have the most suitable conditions for fossilisation are explored. Not only are common animals preserved, but also plants and other, seldom-seen creatures. Locations Burgess Shale Solnhofen Limestone Messel Pit La Brea Tar Pits Animals Trilobites Anomalocaris Archaeopteryx Propalaeotherium Leptictidium Pholidocercus Columbian mammoth Western horse Paramylodon Smilodon Dire wolf Steppe bison American lion
