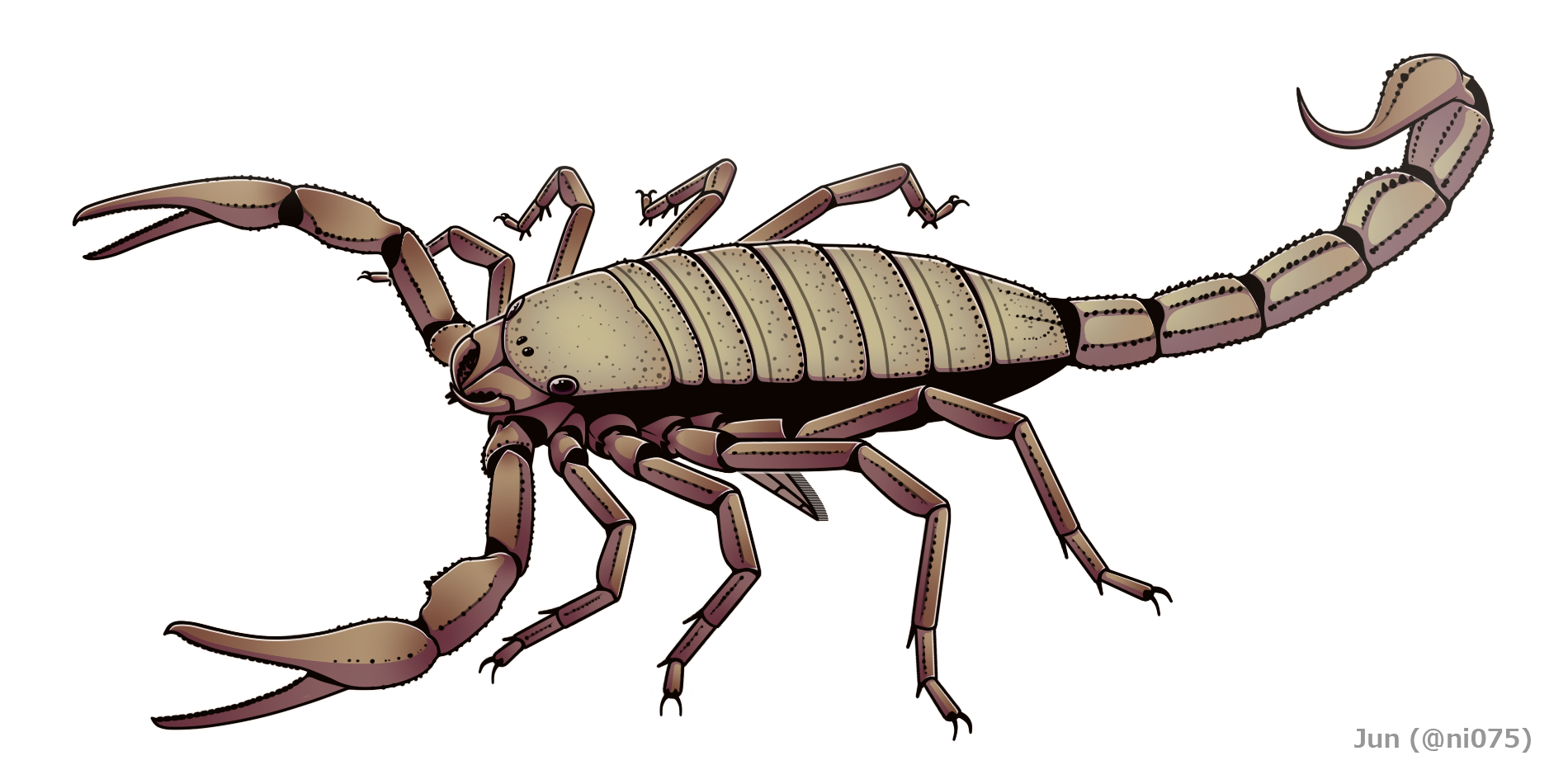
- Reconstruction of Pulmonoscorpius kirktonensis
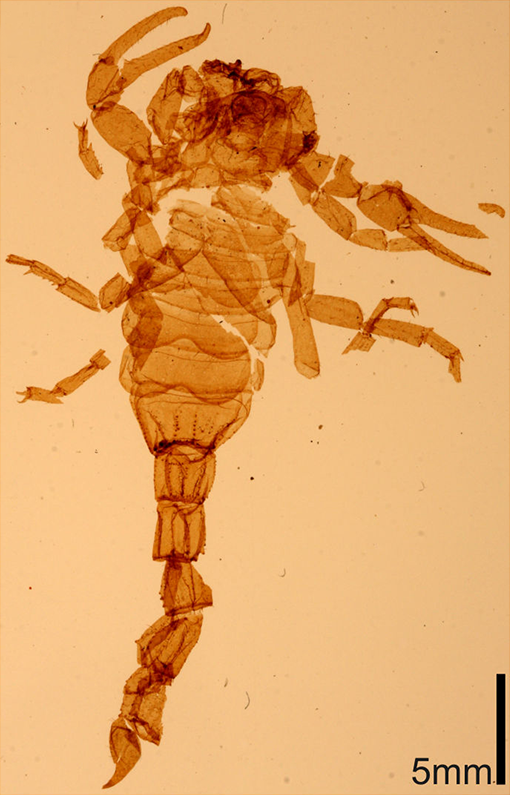
- Juvenile specimen

Scientific classification
- Kingdom: Animalia
- Phylum: Arthropoda
- Subphylum: Chelicerata
- Class: Arachnida
- Order: Scorpiones
- Family: †Centromachidae
- Genus: †Pulmonoscorpius; Jeram, 1994
- Species: †P. kirktonensis

Binomial name
- †Pulmonoscorpius kirktonensis Jeram, 1994

= Pulmonoscorpius =

Pulmonoscorpius Temporal range: Mississippian, Visean

Extinct genus of scorpion

Pulmonoscorpius is an extinct genus of scorpion from the Mississippian subperiod (Early Carboniferous), discovered in Scotland. It contains a single named species, Pulmonoscorpius kirktonensis. It was one of the largest scorpions to have ever lived, with the largest known individual having an estimated length exceeding 70 cm (28 inches). Pulmonoscorpius retains several general arthropod features which are absent in modern scorpions, such as large lateral eyes and a lack of adaptations for a burrowing lifestyle. It was likely an active diurnal predator, and the presence of book lungs indicates that it was fully terrestrial.

== Discovery ==
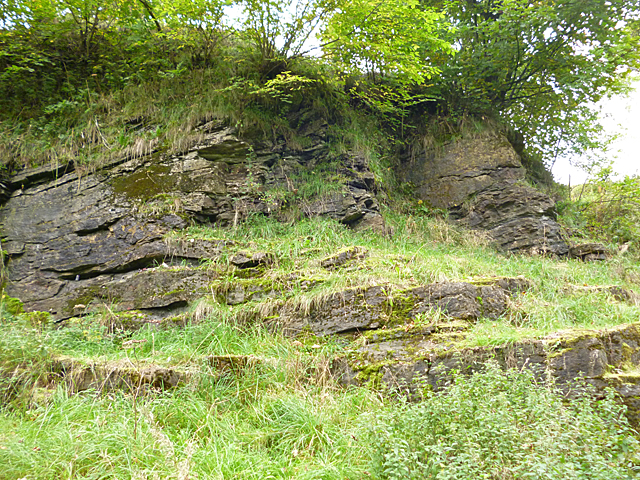
Pulmonoscorpius fossils have been recovered only from the East Kirkton Quarry in West Lothian, Scotland

Fossils of Pulmonoscorpius kirktonensis have been found at the East Kirkton Quarry, West Lothian in Scotland. Rock layers exposed at the quarry date back to the Carboniferous, specifically the Viséan stage of the Mississippian (Early Carboniferous) subperiod, with the units 66-88 dated to 341 ± 3 million years ago. The genus name derives from Latin pulmonis, meaning "lung", and Ancient Greek σκορπίος (skorpíos), meaning "scorpion", while the specific epithet, kirktonensis, refers to the East Kirkton Quarry.

Scorpion cuticles are found in the East Kirkton Limestone (lower exposed units 37-88) and Little Cliff Shale (middle exposed units 32-36) of the East Kirkton Quarry. In 1994, Andrew J. Jeram provisionally assigned almost every scorpion material from the East Kirkton Quarry to Pulmonoscorpius, with 16 complete specimens and over 300 additional fragments from various units, while a few cuticle fragments from the Little Cliff Shale and a single fragment from the East Kirkton Limestone are assigned to an indeterminate palaeoscorpion and an orthostern scorpion. Two distinctive specimens of Pulmonoscorpius from units 42-47 might represent an additional species of this genus.

In each specimen assigned to Pulmonoscorpius, only the outer layer of hyaline cuticle is preserved, estimated to only be 15-18 μm thick in the largest specimen. Although cuticle could be found in a variety of shale and carbonate facies, it is most easily prepared out of finely-laminated limestone, which can be dissolved away with dilute hydrochloric acid while leaving the organic cuticle unharmed. Almost all material is completely flattened, so three-dimensional reconstructions are mostly hypothetical.

== Description ==
The diet of Pulmonoscorpius is not known directly, but it is probable that it preyed on smaller arthropods, and small tetrapods.

Most complete specimens were 13–280 mm (0.51–11.02 in) in length, including the juvenile holotype (NMS G 1992.38.1) from unit 47 which measures 17 mm (0.67 in) long. A large, fragmentary specimen (NMS G 1987.7.8) from the East Kirkton Limestone, somewhere between units 59 and 63, is estimated to have been 70 cm (2 ft 4 in) long when alive.

=== Dorsal surface ===
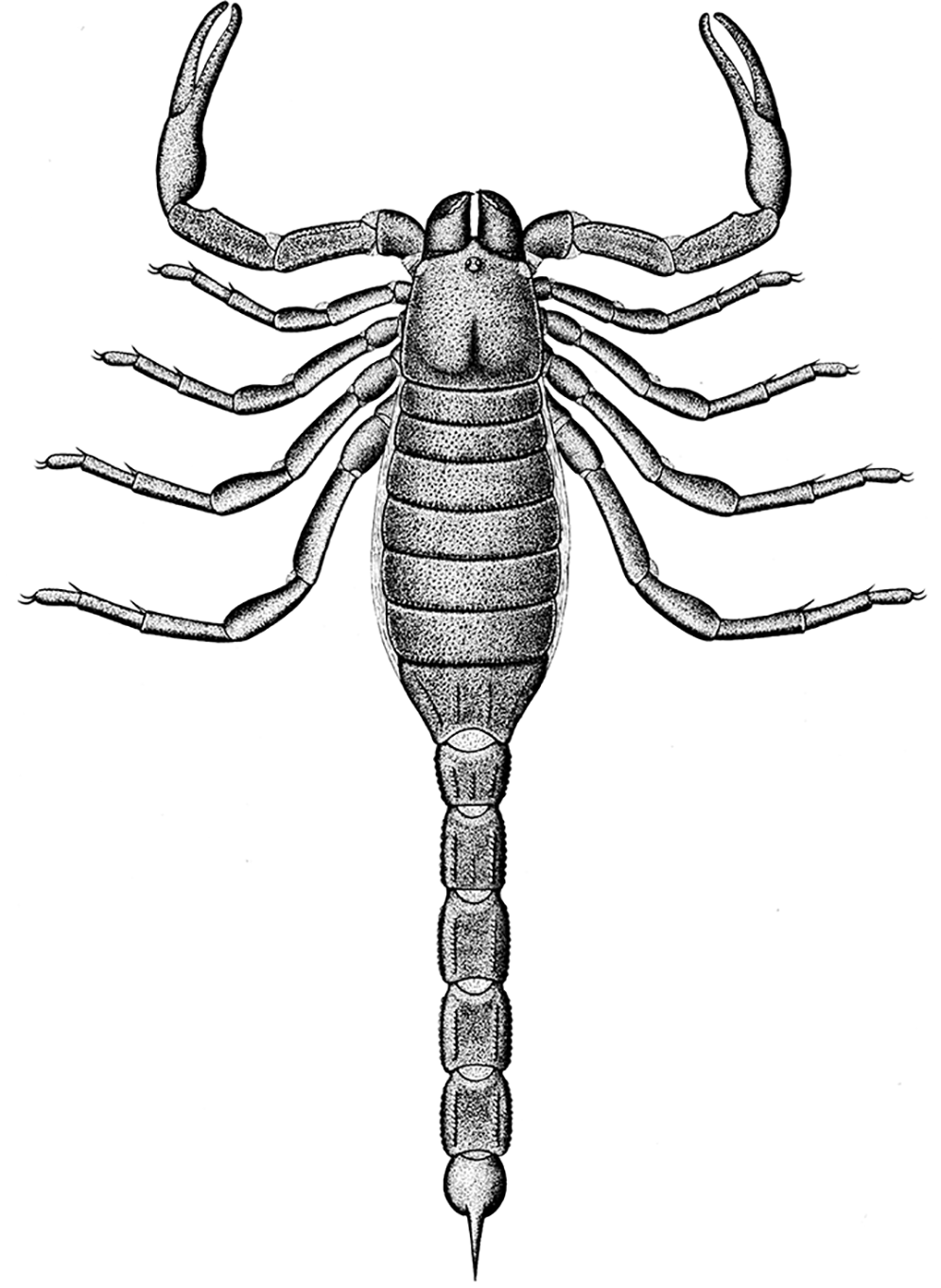
Reconstruction in dorsal view

The prosoma (the head section, also known as a cephalothorax) of Pulmonoscorpius is covered by a carapace (a large plate), where it possesses two pairs of eyes. These include a pair of anterior-positioned median eyes (near the center of the carapace) and a pair of compound lateral eyes (on the edge of the carapace), with each lateral eye bearing between 40 and 60 lateral ocelli. In modern scorpions, lateral eyes are strongly reduced, but those of Pulmonoscorpius are large, similar to other basal scorpions and most other arthropods.

The prosoma is followed by a mesosoma (the broad portion of the abdomen-like opisthosoma), which has seven segments each covered by a tergite (smaller, broad plate). The surface of the carapace and tergites are relatively smooth in juveniles, and become tuberculated as individuals mature.

The metasoma (the so-called "tail") has five segments, not counting the bulbous telson (stinging section, the actual, post-anal tail) at the end. The last (5th) metasomal segment does not exceed the length of the preceding (4th) metasomal segment. Metasomal segments are boxy and ornamented by 4 pairs of carinae (tuberculated ridges) in adults. The strongest carinae are the dorsal (upper) pair, and superior lateral (upper part of the side). Inferior lateral (lower part of the side), and inferior median (underside) carinae are also present. Sexual dimorphism may be present in Pulmonoscorpius, as some specimens (females?) have wider metasomal segments.

In Pulmonoscorpius kirktonensis, the vesicle (venom-bearing portion of the telson) has a pair of strong carinae on its underside. One unique juvenile specimen is observed to lack these carinae, and may belong to a separate species (Pulmonoscorpius sp. A).

=== Ventral structures ===
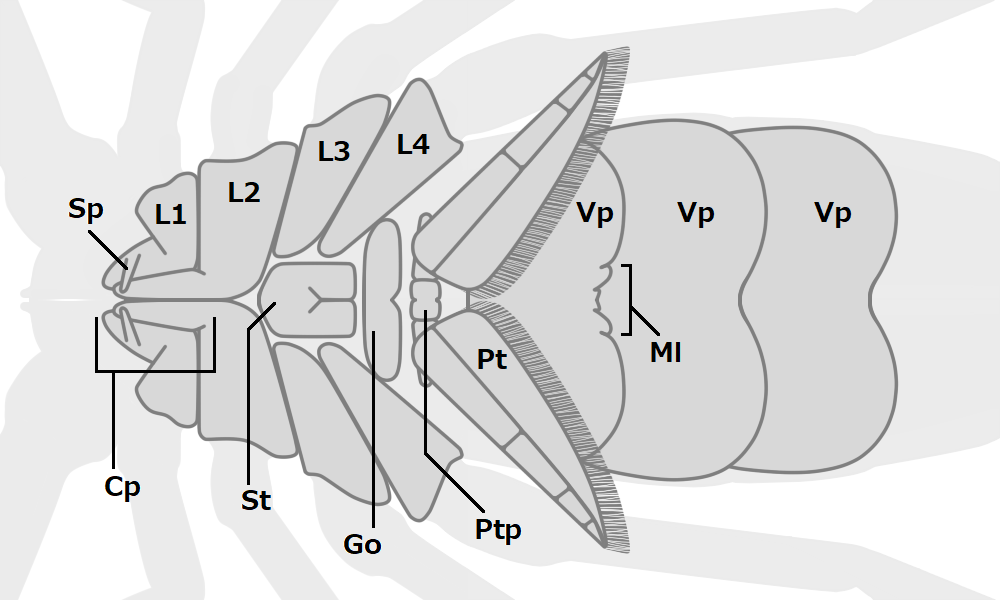
Prosomal and mesosomal ventral structures of a juvenile Pulmonoscorpius (Cp: coxapophysis, Go: genital operculum, L1-4: leg coxae, Ml: median lobation of 1st ventral plate, Pt: pectine, Ptp: pectinal plate, Sp: spur of coxapophysis, St: sternum, Vp: ventral plate)

The coxae of each leg (the segment closest to the body) converge along the underside of the prosoma. The sternum (ventral plate between the coxae of legs 3 and 4) is characteristically elongated, with a Y-shaped sulcus at the rear.

The underside of the mesosoma possesses a bilobed and laterally elongated genital operculum (a covering of the gonopore), followed by pectines (comb-like sensory appendages) with 150–160 narrow teeth, and finally ventral plates (3 in juveniles and 4 in adults). In juveniles, the first ventral plate has a unique median lobation. As with modern scorpions, four pairs of book lungs were present at the corresponding ventral plates.

=== Appendages ===
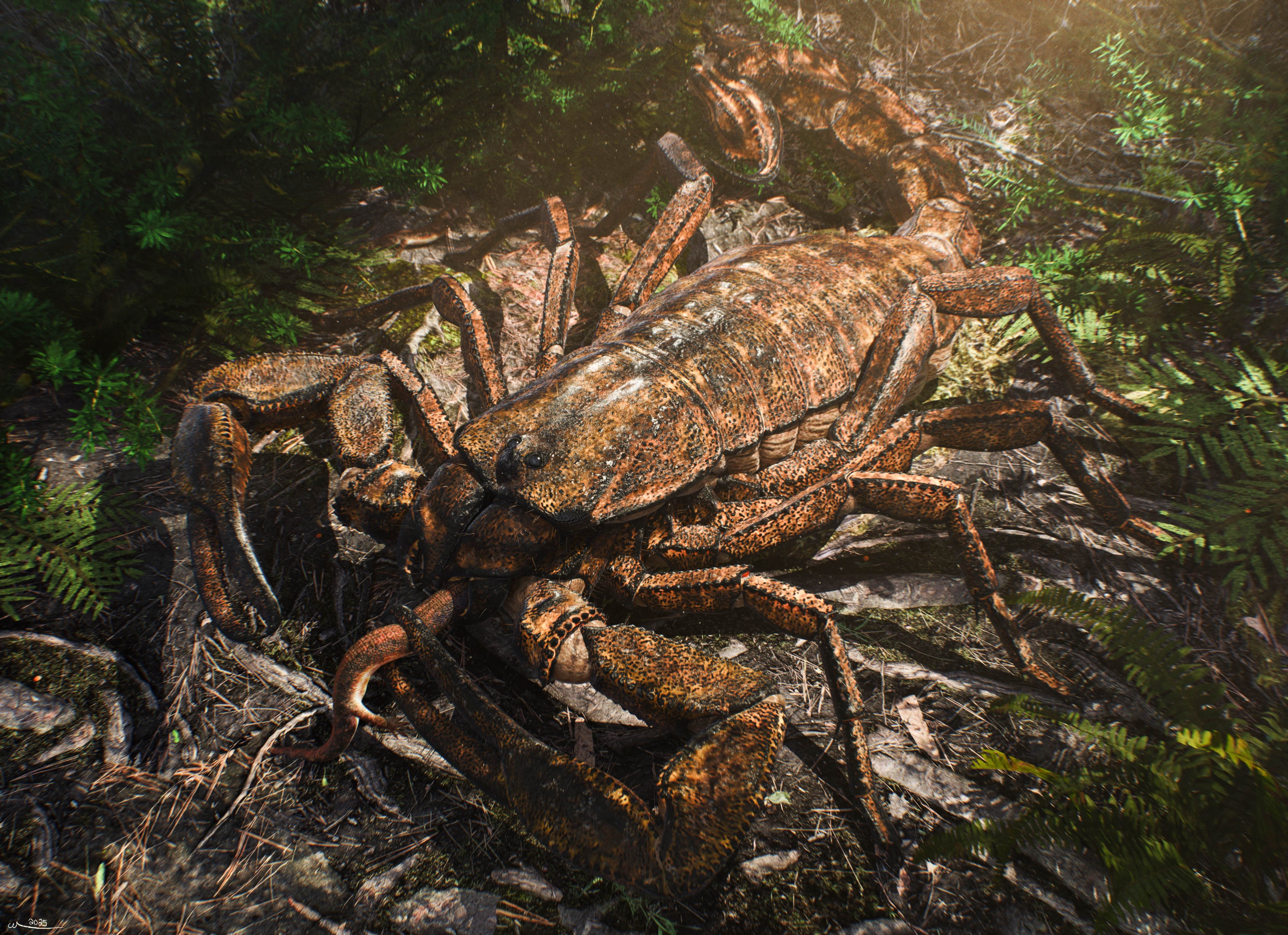
Reconstruction of Pulmonoscorpius feeding on a Westlothiana. The presence of large compound lateral eyes and the forward placement of the median eyes indicate that Pulmonoscorpius was an active diurnal predator.

Like other scorpions, Pulmonoscorpius has four pairs of walking legs as well as larger pincer-like pedipalps and smaller pincer-like chelicerae (mouthparts). One characteristic trait of Pulmonoscorpius is the presence of a long spur on each of the apophyses (an extension of the coxa).

The chelicerae and legs were noted be to be similar to those of extant scorpions, except that the coxa and femur (first and third segments) in legs 3 and 4 are less elongated, and the tibia (fifth segment) of these legs are elongated to about the same length as their femur. In the pedipalps, the femur and patella (fourth segment) are lined with carinae. Setae (hairs) are sparse and clustered, particularly in larger individuals. Setae density is highest on the large (fixed) finger of the pedipalps. One juvenile specimen has 30% more setae on its fixed finger than any other Pulmonoscorpius kirktonensis specimen. This specimen may belong to a separate species (Pulmonoscorpius sp. B).

Aside from the type species, two other specimens were noted to possibly be distinct: one having juvenile pedipalp fingers with 30% more setal follicles than P. kirktonensis, and one lacking tuberculateventral carinae on the vesicle of its telson.
