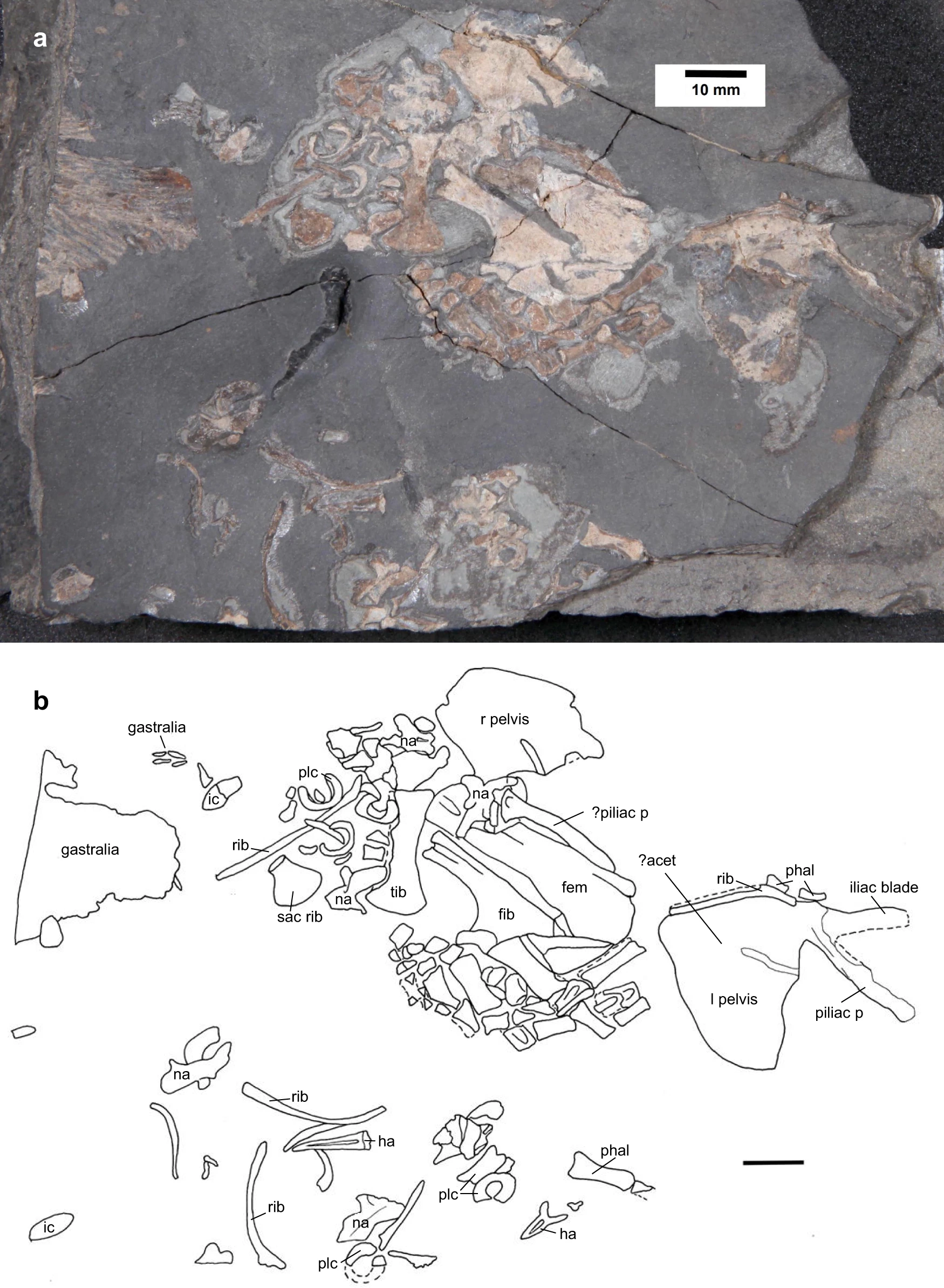
- Photo and drawing of the holotype

Scientific classification
- Domain: Eukaryota
- Kingdom: Animalia
- Phylum: Chordata
- Clade: Tetrapoda
- Clade: Reptiliomorpha
- Genus: †Termonerpeton; Clack, Smithson & Ruta 2022
- Species: †T. makrydactylus

Binomial name
- †Termonerpeton makrydactylus Clack, Smithson & Ruta 2022

= Termonerpeton =

Termonerpeton Temporal range: Mississippian

Prehistoric tetrapod

Termonerpeton is a genus of Carboniferous tetrapods from Scotland that lived around 336 million years ago. The only species is Termonerpeton makrydactylus.
