= Westlothiana =

Westlothiana Temporal range: Viséan, 341 Ma
- Type specimen of Westlothiana lizziae, counterpart slab

Scientific classification
- Kingdom: Animalia
- Phylum: Chordata
- Clade: Elpistostegalia
- Clade: Stegocephali
- Genus: †Westlothiana; Smithson and Rolfe, 1990

Type species
- †Westlothiana lizziae Smithson and Rolfe, 1990

Extinct genus of tetrapods

Westlothiana ("animal from West Lothian") is an extinct genus of tetrapods from the Mississippian (early Carboniferous) of Scotland. It is known from a single species, Westlothiana lizziae. Westlothiana is one of the most noted fossils of the East Kirkton Quarry fossil site, living about 341 million years ago during the Viséan age. It was a small tetrapod with a long body, short limbs (with five toes on the hindlimb), and a blunt-nosed skull with small fangs on the roof of the mouth.

The classification of Westlothiana has gone through much revision. It was initially regarded as the oldest known reptile (or, more specifically, the oldest known member of Amniota, the group containing reptiles, mammals, and birds). Within a few years, it was reevaluated to be not quite an amniote, but rather a non-amniote tetrapod (an amphibian, in the broad sense). For decades, Westlothiana was still considered a "reptiliomorph" (an amphibian more closely related to amniotes than to modern amphibians). This would also qualify it as one of oldest known crown group tetrapods. A comprehensive 2026 redescription using synchrotron X-ray tomography instead found Westlothiana to be a stem-group tetrapod, diverging prior to the common ancestor of modern amphibians and amniotes. In this analysis, it is regarded as an amphibious or aquatic animal closely related to the limbless aistopods.

== Discovery and naming ==
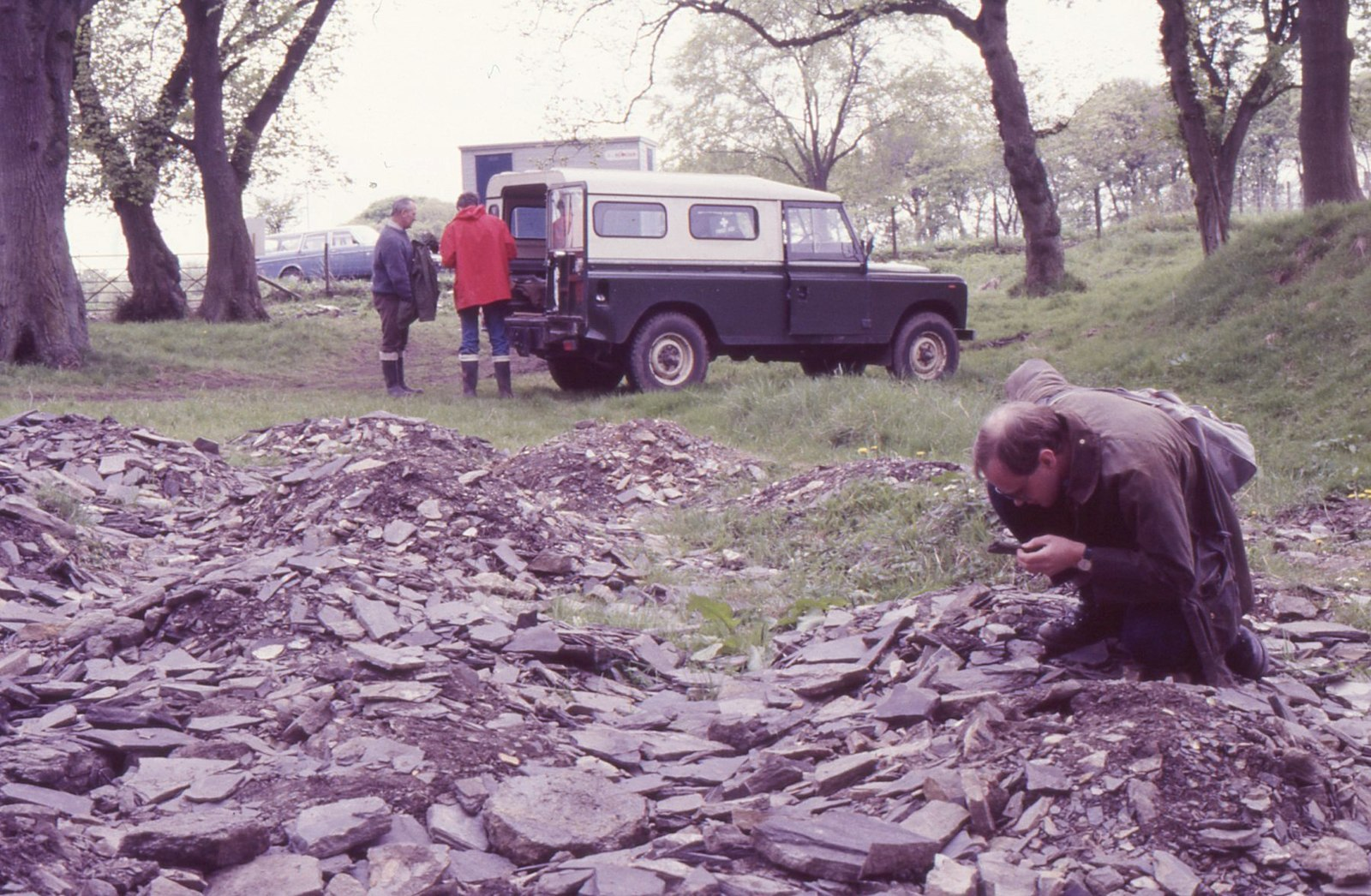
Scottish geologists searching for fossils in the spoil heaps of East Kirkton Quarry, 1987

The type specimen of Westlothiana was discovered in 1988 by Scottish fossil hunter Stan Wood. He found it in unit 82 of the East Kirkton Limestone, a fossil-rich layer exclusive to the East Kirkton Quarry near Bathgate in West Lothian, Scotland. A 2025 study estimated that unit 82 is around 341 ± 3 million years old. The type specimen is a compression fossil split into part and counterpart slabs, both catalogued as NMS G.1990.72.1. It represents a mostly-complete skeleton, only missing part of the tail and hands.

Stan Wood nicknamed his find "Lizzie the lizard", and this name was quickly adopted by other paleontologists and the press. University of Cambridge paleontologist Timothy R. Smithson briefly described the fossil in a 1989 issue of Nature. By that time, it had already been featured in the first episode of Lost Worlds, Vanished Lives, a David Attenborough miniseries on new fossil discoveries.

Stan Wood demanded £180,000 (£445,121 adjusted for inflation) for the purchase of the fossil, which took UK museums by surprise due to the very high asking price relative to the £40,000 (£98,916 adjusted for inflation) they had expected to pay, and were unable to afford Wood's asking price. In April 1989, an agreement of sale at the £180,000 asking price was made with the State Museum of Natural History Stuttgart which on the museum's part was an attempt to avoid the specimen falling into a private collection. Following Wood making an application to the Export of Works of Art Committee to approve the fossil's export, the committee, in its first ever review of a fossil specimen, made a recommendation to delay the export of the fossil by 4 months. This was however overruled by the British Government, who stated that as a fossil and not a human artefact, that export control legislation related to artefacts did not apply to it. By February of 1990, Stuttgart Museum had agreed to delay the sale of the fossil until the end of July to allow the possibility of finding funding for the fossil to stay in the UK. The fossil was purchased by the National Museums Scotland around August 1990 following a public appeal, which raised £195,500 (£483,451 adjusted for inflation) in total to purchase the specimen.

Timothy R. Smithson and National Museums Scotland paleontologist W.D. Ian Rolfe formally provided a scientific name in 1990, combining the generic name Westlothiana (referencing West Lothian Council, who had given £20,000 towards the purchase of the fossil) with the specific name "lizziae", an homage to its nickname. Despite its similar body shape, Westlothiana is not a lizard, as true lizards would not appear until more than 100 million years later.

Smithson et al. (1993) referred a second East Kirkton tetrapod skeleton to Westlothiana lizzae. This second specimen, catalogued as NMS G.1991.47.1, is from unit 76, which is a slightly younger layer at the quarry. Igielman et al. (2026) disagreed that this skeleton is a fossil of Westlothiana, noting its differing number of vertebrae and foot bones.

== Description ==
Size comparison

Westlothiana probably lived in or around freshwater lakes, hunting for other small creatures that lived in the same habitat. It was a slender animal, with rather small limbs and a presumably long tail. Together with Casineria, another transitional fossil found in Scotland, it is one of the smallest reptile-like amphibians known, estimated to be less than 20 cm (7.9 in) in adult length. The small size has made it a key fossil in the search for the earliest amniote, as amniote eggs are thought to have evolved in very small animals.

Ruta et al. (2003) interpreted the long body and small legs as a possible adaption to burrowing, similar to modern skinks. On the other hand, Igielman et al. (2023) noted many features consistent with an aquatic or amphibious lifestyle, such as gill arches, a wide notochord, and hindlimbs longer than forelimbs. Westlothiana were heavily scaled, with thin dermal (bony) scales on the belly and many rows of thick, overlapping scales on the back, similar to early tetrapods but in contrast to amniotes, in which the scales are epidermal, or formed in the skin.

=== Skull ===
Skull diagram of Westlothiana in multiple views, based on Igielman et al. (2026). Gill arches are not illustrated, though in the fossil they attach to the braincase.

The skull is small compared to the overall body length, and although flattened in the holotype, many components are visible. When reconstructed digitally, the skull measures 1.7 centimetres (0.67 in) in length. Components which were initially hidden by the crushing, such as the palate (roof of the mouth), were later revealed by further preparation and X-ray scans. The skull is coated with tiny pits. The orbits (eye sockets) are quite large, each filled with a scleral ring. The skull is fairly broad, but not as shallow as in some early tetrapods.

The teeth are all the same size, unlike many early amniotes which have larger fang-like teeth in the middle of the mouth. There are 9 teeth in the premaxilla and 34 teeth in the maxilla. Westlothiana has often been considered to lack "labyrinthodont" folding, a type of maze-like internal tooth structure most common in large prehistoric amphibians. This trait appears to be correlated with size, rather than evolutionary relations, and the teeth of Westlothiana do have some internal folding at the base. There is a small hole in the skull (an internarial fenestra) between the premaxillae, unlike amniotes and their close relatives. Like other early tetrapods, the quadrate bone (which holds the upper half of the jaw joint) slants back towards the jaw joint. The postfrontal bones, which typically occupy the upper rear corner of the orbits, are very elongated in Westlothiana. They stretch forward to form most of the upper rim of the eye sockets, and contact the prefrontal bones at the front edge of each socket, unlike amniotes. The prefrontals are also prolonged forward, far enough to contact the nostrils.

==== Skull roof ====
The bones of the skull roof (the upper part of the skull, behind the eyes) have several distinctive features. The largest components are the parietal bones, which are wide enough to reach the sides of the skull. The skull roof is loosely attached to bones of the cheek region (such as the straight-edged squamosals), similar to amniotes and various amphibians. The rear edge of the skull roof is formed by three pairs of bones, the postparietals, tabulars, and supratemporals (listed from inwards to outwards). The postparietals are wide, the tabulars are blunt overhangs, and the supratemporals are narrow. This inward-to-outward series is similar to protorothyridids but very different from the condition in microsaurs. Many larger Paleozoic amphibians have a wide otic notch for a spiracle between the squamosal and tabular. In Westlothiana, the otic notch is reduced to a narrow slit. Broad parietals and a narrow otic notch are also seen in aistopods and embolomeres. The rear edge of the skull roof does not bend down to meet the braincase, unlike amniotes or many microsaurs.

Supratemporals are rare among lepospondyls, but they are similarly present and narrow in urocordylids and a few early aistopods. Each supratemporal contacts the elongated postorbital bone behind the orbit, cutting off the parietals from the squamosals. This contrasts with sauropsids (reptiles), but is similar to the condition in diadectomorphs and early synapsids. Microsaurs do not have supratemporals, though their typically large tabular bones also prevent parietal-squamosal contact. In more basal tetrapods, an additional bone known as an intertemporal was positioned at the intersection of the four bones. Most reptiliomorphs which lost the intertemporal filled the space using a 'lappet' of the parietal bones. In Westlothiana, Limnoscelis, and lepospondyls, this space is instead filled by an expansion of the rear branch of the postorbital bone, behind the eye.

==== Palate ====
Although the skull generally shows a combination of amniote and non-amniote features, the palate (bony roof of the mouth) notably lacks amniote adaptations. The entire palate is covered with small tooth-like prickles known as denticles. This is not unusual among early amphibians (palatal dentition is widespread among early tetrapods), but early amniotes usually concentrate their denticles into isolated patches or rows. The denticles of Westlothiana even extend onto the parasphenoid bone, which forms part of the underside of the braincase.

The largest and most centralized bones of the palate are the pterygoids, which have simple tapering extensions towards the jaw joint. This is a notable contrast to all early amniotes, in which each pterygoid bends outwards with a tooth-covered prong known as a transverse flange. Other typical basal tetrapod traits include large ectopterygoid bones and prominent fangs on the palate: one fang pair on each elongated vomer, and one pair on each palatine bone. These fangs were only recognized once synchrotron scans revealed the palate as a whole in the 2026 redescription.

==== Braincase and gills ====
The braincase retains fish-like features which help to reveal Westlothiana's deeper ancestry than previously thought. For example, the basioccipital (rear lower plate of the braincase) is separated from the parasphenoid (front lower plate) due to a horizontal fissure, unlike later amphibians and amniotes. Long orbitosphenoids are attached to the upper edge of the parasphenoid. The basioccipital also has an enormous notochord canal and two pairs of knobs connecting to gill arches. Each gill arch is at minimum a two-part rod with a groove for a major artery. The discovery of gill arches suggests that adult Westlothiana spent part of their lives in water. The gills were probably fully functional and internalized, more similar to those of fish than to the external gills of larval salamanders.

==== Lower jaw ====
When seen from the outside, the lower jaw appears similar to amniotes. The dentary (toothed component) holds 33 teeth, concentrated towards the front half of the jaw. When seen from the inside, the jaw appears much more primitive even by amphibian standards. Inwards from the dentary tooth row, Westlothiana has an adsymphyseal bone (near the chin) followed by three plate-like coronoid bones, a large prearticular, and finally a small articular which forms the lower half of the jaw joint. All of these bones are covered with denticles, a fish-like quality. Denticles have never been found on the prearticular or articular in crown-group tetrapod (apart from advanced edaphosaurids, where the prearticular contributes to a plant-shredding plate). Crown-group tetrapods also entirely lack an adsymphyseal, and most tend to simplify their coronoids into fewer elements.

=== Torso ===
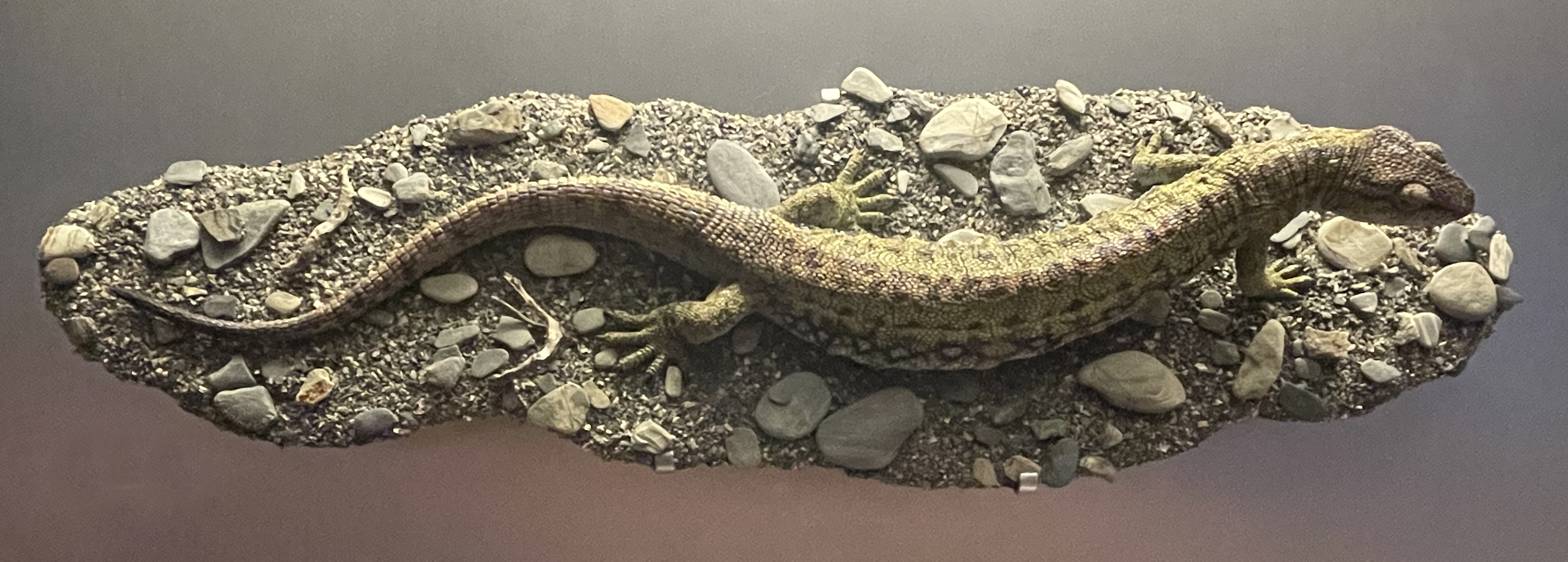
Sculpture of Westlothiana at the National Museum of Scotland

The body is elongated, with 36 vertebrae between the skull and the base of the tail. The neck is very short, with only four vertebrae. The atlas (first vertebra) has a narrow and simple connection to the skull, unlike microsaurs but similar to aistopods. Westlothiana does not preserve a complete tail, so the length of the tail is unknown. The 27 preserved tail vertebrae do not diminish further down the tail, so the tail was probably much longer than preserved. Apart from the atlas, all vertebrae are multi-part bones, split into a large pleurocentrum bone at the rear of each segment and a smaller intercentrum at the front of each segment. Vertebrae with large pleurocentra and small intercentra with gaps at the top are often called "gastrocentrous", and this format has long been considered the standard in tetrapods close to origin of amniotes.

The pleurocentra are spool-shaped cylinders, pierced by a large canal for the spinal cord and closely sutured to low, triangular neural spines (upwards projections). Despite being shorter than the pleurocentra (from front-to-back), the intercentra are still relatively tall and U-shaped, unlike the lower crescent-shaped intercentra of early amniotes. Some stem-tetrapods also have tall intercentra, such as embolomeres and Acherontiscus. The short neural spines are similar to lepospondyl vertebrae. The vertebrae also possess a unique feature unlike other potential reptiliomorphs: several large keels along the underside of each pleurocentrum. Synapsids also have keels under their pleurocentral, though in those mammal-like animals the keels are closer to the midline compared to Westlothiana. The ribs of Westlothiana are connect to the intercentra in every vertebra between the skull and the hip.

=== Shoulder and forelimbs ===
The forelimb is only half the length of the hindlimb, a trait shared with lepospondyls and some aquatic reptiles. The only well-preserved portions of the shoulder girdle are the scapulocoracoids (shoulder blades), which are large and robust. The humerus (upper arm bone) is simple and thinnest in the middle, more similar to microsaurs, modern amphibians, and early amniotes. Earlier and larger stem-tetrapods tend to have a broader, more L-shaped humerus adapted for underwater paddling. A narrow, hourglass-shaped humerus may have given Westlothiana better weight-bearing capacity than other stem-tetrapods. The ulna (inner forearm bone) is similar to that of gracile "pelycosaurs", including small species of Dimetrodon such as D. milleri.

Although the hand of Lizzie was disarticulated prior to fossilizing, four metacarpal bones can be identified in the fossil. This indicates Westlothiana possessed at least four fingers, though it does not discount the possibility of five fingers on the hand. Practically all reptiliomorphs have five-fingered hands, the standard count at the origin of crown-tetrapods. Lepospondyls (with the exceptions of Diceratosaurus and Urocordylus) have four or fewer fingers, as do the unrelated temnospondyls and their living amphibian descendants.

=== Hip and hindlimbs ===
Left hind feet of Paleozoic tetrapods. Westlothiana is (e).

The pelvis (hip) is large, with the upper portion formed by a rod-shaped ilium and the lower portion formed by a narrow and long puboischiadic plate. The rear portion of the puboischiadic plate is particularly long in Westlothiana compared to other reptiliomorphs, but the other parts of the pelvis are more typical. The femur (thigh bone) is slender, and is also thinnest in the middle, as with the humerus. Also similar to the humerus, the femur's crests and roughened areas for muscle attachment are large considering the small size of the animal. Although the femur is generally similar to that of synapsids, the tibia and fibula (lower leg bones) are much more simple and primitive. They are noticeably smaller than the femur, a condition opposite to the trend in most reptiliomorphs leading to amniotes.

The foot has five toes. Its phalangeal formula (the number of separate bones in each toe, from the innermost to outermost toe) is 2-3-4-5-4. This formula is identical to that of early amniotes, but conversely the foot of Westlothiana is shorter and more robust than the long-toed feet of amniotes. Additionally, the phalanges (toe bones) decrease in relative length towards the tip of each toe, while the opposite is true of amniotes. The phalanges at the tips of each toe are curved and tapering, potentially acting as predecessors to claws in the pursuit of greater traction.

==== Ankle ====
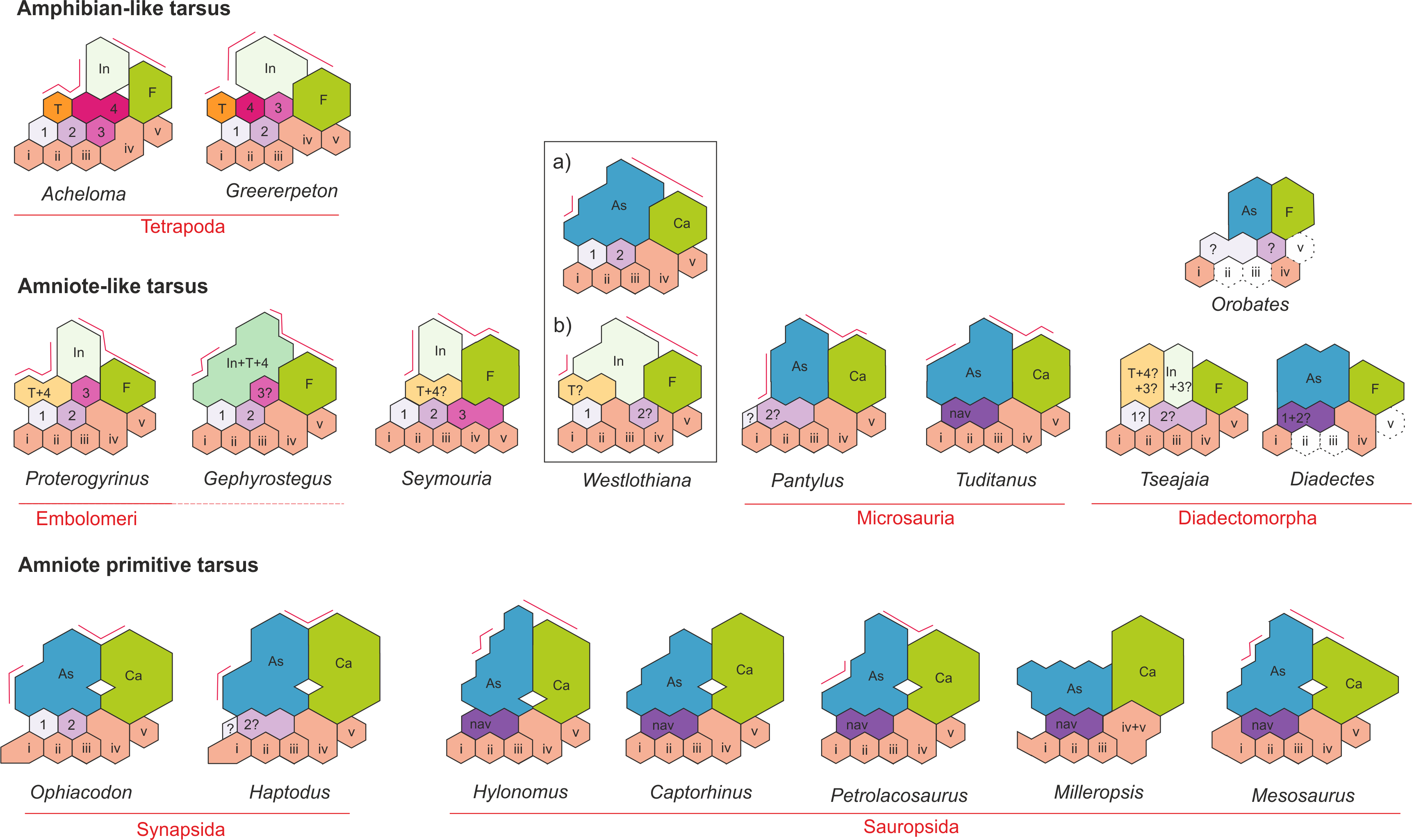
Schematic diagrams showing the arrangement of ankle bones in Paleozoic tetrapods. For Westlothiana, (a) applies to Smithson (1989)'s interpretation, and (b) applies to Smithson et al. (1993)'s

The ankle of Westlothiana is intermediate between amniotes and amphibians, though the exact details are subject to various interpretations. Amphibians have ankles with 12 bones, early amniotes have 8, and Westlothiana has been interpreted to have 9, 10, or 11 ankle bones.

In modern amphibians and most non-amniote tetrapods, the ankle is formed by 12 bones. Five small, rounded bones, known as distal tarsals, connect to the metatarsals (foot bones) which each lead to a toe. Three somewhat larger ankle bones, known as proximal tarsals, connect to the bones of the lower leg. These three proximal tarsals are the medium-sized fibulare (which connects to the fibula), the small tibiale (which connects to the tibia), and the quite large intermedium which lies in the middle and contacts both the fibula and tibia. Four small numbered bones known as centralia fill in the gaps between the proximal and distal tarsals.

In early amniotes, the ankle is only formed by eight bones. The five distal tarsals are typically unchanged, but usually only a single centrale is preserved. This single remaining centrale is the navicular bone, formed by the retention of only the second centrale or the fusion of the first and second. Amniotes are also very different from amphibians by having only two large proximal tarsals. The calcaneum, which contacts the fibula, is equivalent to the fibulare. The other proximal tarsal, the astragalus (or talus), is probably a fusion of the intermedium, tibiale, and the fourth (and possible also the third) centrale. Some lepospondyls, such as the reptile-like microsaur Tuditanus, also may have evolved these modifications.

The ankle of Westlothiana, as well as that of most other "reptiliomorphs", is intermediate between these two conditions. Smithson (1989) reported that "Lizzie" had nine ankle bones, including an astragalus and calcaneum, and that the third and fourth centrales were already fused or lost. He also noted that centrales one and two were not yet fused into a navicular. Smithson et al. (1993) later claimed that there were ten bones, arguing that the components of the astragalus were not completely fused, with the intermedium and tibiale still separate. Piñeiro, Demarco, & Meneghel (2016) could not determine which of these two interpretations were correct, but did note that the largest bone more closely resembled a fused astragalus rather than an unfused intermedium. Igielman et al. (2026) added another bone to the count, by recognizing a separate fourth centrale.

== Classification ==
Life restoration

The phylogenetic placement of Westlothiana has historically varied from basal amniote (i.e. a primitive reptile) to a basal Lepospondyl, in analyses with the lepospondyls branching off from within Reptiliomorpha. The actual phylogenetic position of Westlothiana is uncertain, reflecting both the fragmentary nature of the find and the uncertainty of "labyrinthodont" phylogeny in general.

=== Earliest amniote ===
Westlothiana was originally regarded as the oldest known reptile. This interpretation made headlines even before Westlothiana was formally described or named, and continued for a short while into the 1990s. More precisely, it could be considered the earliest amniote (tetrapods with specialized waterproof eggs and skin). Modern amniotes include reptiles, birds, and mammals. By the end of the Carboniferous, amniotes had split into early synapsids (the ancestors of mammals) and sauropsids (the ancestors of modern reptiles, and by extension birds). The earliest amniotes were superficially lizard-like, with a low metabolism, low-slung body, and scaly skin. Circa-1990, few paleontologists formally distinguished terms like "amniote" and "reptile", though the distinction is far more common in recent decades.

=== Stem-amniote ===
Not long after its original description, Westlothiana was recognized to not be a true, crown-group amniote (in other words, it originated prior to the common ancestor of synapsids and sauropsids). In 1993, Smithson and his colleagues published a more comprehensive description of the fossil, reevaluating it as an amphibian (in the broad sense) closely related to Amniota. Under this interpretation, Westlothiana is a stem-amniote, an animal more closely related to amniotes than to modern amphibians (Lissamphibia), while not qualifying as an amniote itself.

Terms like "reptiliomorph" and "anthracosaur" are sometimes used to describe amniote relatives, including other major groups such as diadectomorphs and seymouriamorphs. Amniote-like biology likely originated slightly prior to crown-group amniotes. Since there is no fossil record of land-based eggs in the Paleozoic, the exact timing of these major biological changes is a matter of conjecture.

==== Relation to lepospondyls ====
In the 2000s, one common classification of Westlothiana considers it to be the earliest diverging (most "basal" or "primitive") member of "Lepospondyli". This was supported by analyses such as Clack (2002), Ruta et al. (2003), and Ruta & Coates (2007). Lepospondyli is a grouping of various small and unusual Paleozoic tetrapods: the lizard-like or burrowing microsaurs, newt-like nectrideans (including the boomerang-headed diplocaulids), and limbless, snake-like adelospondyls and aistopods. There has long been diagreement over whether these lepospondyl subgroups are actually closely related to each other.

Studies which place Westlothiana within or near Lepospondyli often support the idea that lepospondyls are not very distant from amniotes. Most researches consider modern amphibians (Lissamphibia) to be descendants of an earlier-diverging prehistoric amphibian group, the Temnospondyli. A minority opinion, espoused by Michel Laurin and his colleagues, argues that lissamphibians have their origin among lepospondyls. Under this unorthodox interpretation, Westlothiana is closer to modern amphibians than to amniotes, although still close to both.

=== Stem-tetrapod ===
The comprehensive 2026 redescription found Westlothiana to have a deeper evolutionary origin than any previous study. It was found to be a member of the tetrapod stem group, closely related to the limbless aistopods and the former microsaur Utaherpeton. This would render it a close relative of neither modern amphibians or amniotes, instead branching off the tetrapod family tree prior to the common ancestor of either group. It was more closely related to modern tetrapods than whatcheeriids (as evidenced by the presence of clawed digits, absent in whatcheeriids, but present in all more advanced stem-tetrapods), but also less closely related to modern tetrapods than baphetoids.

The following cladogram is a simplification of the results of Igielman (2026):

- Tetrapodomorpha
  - †Eusthenopteron
  - - †Tiktaalik
    - - †Ichthyostega
      - - †Acanthostega
        - - †Whatcheeriidae
          - - †Embolomeri
            - †Colosteidae
            - - †Westlothiana
              - †Aistopoda
            - - †Baphetoidea
              - crown-group Tetrapoda
                - Temnospondyli (including Lissamphibia, i.e. modern amphibians)
                - - †Seymouriamorpha
                  - - †Recumbirostra
                    - - †Diadectomorpha
                      - - †Captorhinidae
                        - Amniota (including modern mammals, reptiles and birds)

== See also ==
- Casineria
- Solenodonsaurus
