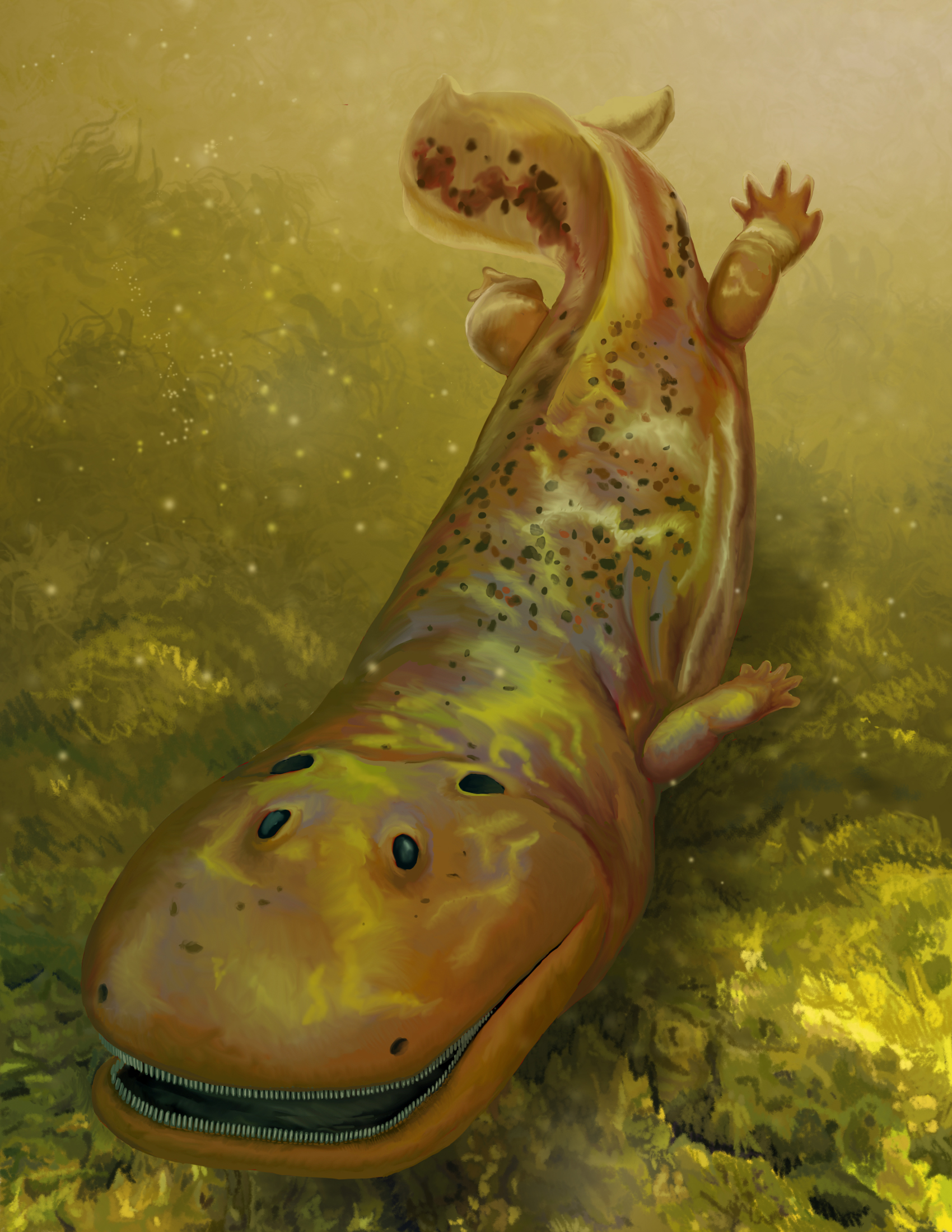
- Life restoration of Spathicephalus mirus

Scientific classification
- Domain: Eukaryota
- Kingdom: Animalia
- Phylum: Chordata
- Clade: Sarcopterygii
- Clade: Tetrapodomorpha
- Clade: Elpistostegalia
- Clade: Stegocephali
- Superfamily: †Baphetoidea
- Family: †Spathicephalidae; Beaumont, 1977
- Genus: †Spathicephalus; Watson, 1929

Species
- †S. marsdeni Smithson et al., 2017; †S. mirus Watson, 1929 (type); †S. pereger Baird, 1962

= Spathicephalus =

Spathicephalus Temporal range: Early - Late Carboniferous, 326–313 Ma

Extinct genus of tetrapods

Spathicephalus is an extinct genus of stem tetrapods (early four-limbed vertebrates) that lived during the middle of the Carboniferous Period. The genus includes two species: the type species S. mirus from Scotland, which is known from two mostly complete skulls and other cranial material, and the species S. pereger from Nova Scotia, which is known from a single fragment of the skull table. Based on the S. mirus material, the appearance of Spathicephalus is unlike that of any other early tetrapod, with a flattened, square-shaped skull and jaws lined with hundreds of very small chisel-like teeth. However, Spathicephalus shares several anatomical features with a family of stem tetrapods called Baphetidae, leading most paleontologists who have studied the genus to place it within a larger group called Baphetoidea, often as part of its own monotypic family Spathicephalidae. Spathicephalus is thought to have fed on aquatic invertebrates through a combination of suction feeding and filter feeding.

== History of study ==
The type species of Spathicephalus, S. mirus, was named by paleontologist D. M. S. Watson in 1929. Watson described seven fossil specimens from an outcrop of the Rumbles Ironstone in the town of Loanhead in Midlothian, Scotland. The ironstone dates to the late Namurian stage (earliest Upper Carboniferous) and is part of the Limestone Coal Group. These specimens were discovered in the 1880s and include a mostly complete skull with the palate exposed, an impression of the underside of a skull roof, a right portion of the back of a skull, and various jaw fragments. At the time, Spathicephalus and other tetrapods from the Namurian of Scotland were some of the oldest tetrapods known, predating the better-known Late Carboniferous tetrapod assemblages of the British Coal Measures. In November 1974, Scottish paleontologist Stanley P. Wood discovered additional skull and jaw fragments of Spathicephalus in an open-pit mine (the Dora Open Cast Mine) near the town of Cowdenbeath in Fife. Wood found these fossils in a layer of siltstone that is the same age as the ironstone in Loanhead.

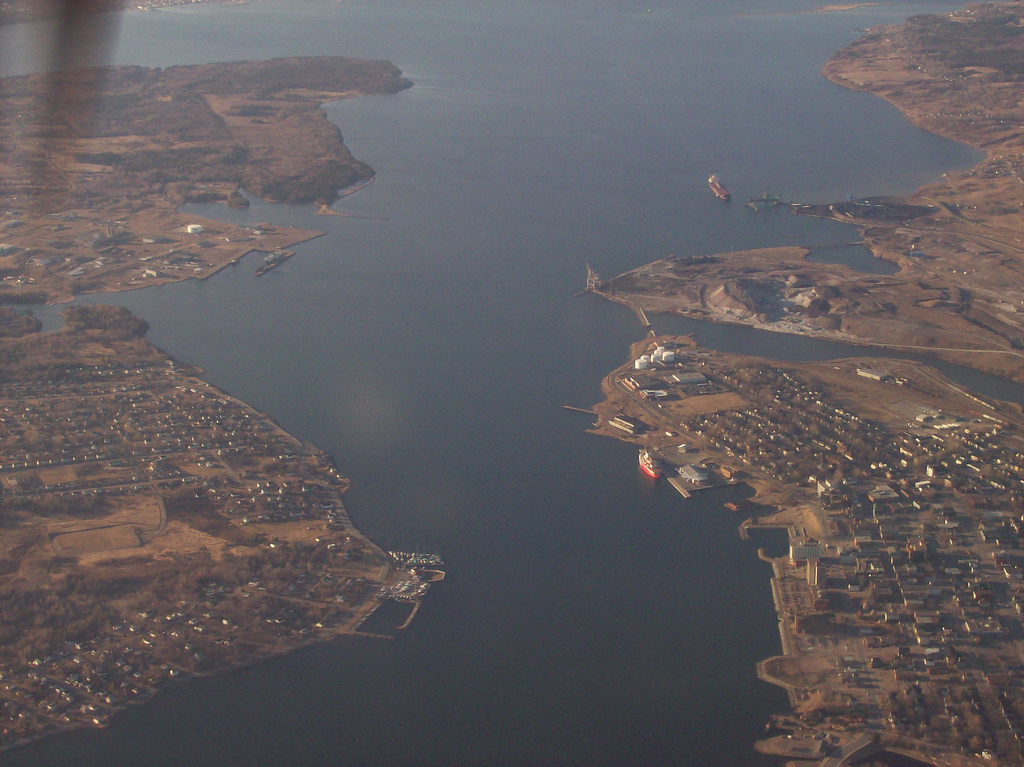
Aerial view of Point Edward, Nova Scotia, where S. pereger was discovered. The specimen came from the beach to the right of the tip of Point Edward at the upper left of the photograph. The body of water is Sydney Harbor.

American paleontologist Donald Baird named a second species of Spathicephalus, S. pereger, from Nova Scotia in 1962. Baird named S. pereger on the basis of an impression of the right half of a skull table that collectors from the Harvard Museum of Comparative Zoology found on a beach between Point Edward and Keating Cove on Cape Breton Island. The impression was preserved in siltstone from the Point Edward Formation, which dates to the latest Upper Carboniferous (equivalent to the early Namurian in Europe), meaning that S. pereger predates S. mirus by several million years.

== Description ==
Bones of the skull of Spathicephalus mirus

Unlike most other early tetrapods which have rounded or pointed snouts, Spathicephalus mirus has a flattened, almost perfectly square-shaped skull up to 22 centimetres (8.7 in) in both width and length. The squared shape is caused primarily by a widening of the paired nasal bones along the midline of the snout. The premaxilla bones at the tip of the snout form the entire front edge of the square, while the maxilla bones form the side edges. The maxillae of Spathicephalus are unusual in being thin (no more than 1 centimetre (0.39 in) in thickness) along their entire length. The orbits or eye sockets are large, facing directly upward and positioned close together near the back of the skull. Unlike the roughly circular orbits of most tetrapods, the orbits of Spathicephalus are kidney-shaped because they have fused with another pair of holes called the antorbital fenestrae (in other early tetrapods, the antorbital fenestrae lie in front of the orbits and are separate from them). The skull table behind the orbits is very small in comparison to those of other Carboniferous tetrapods, but like those of other tetrapods, it bears a small hole in its center called a pineal foramen. Small tabular "horns" extend laterally from the back of the skull table, forming the temporal notches. The surface of the skull roof is covered by raised bumps and ridges, a condition paleontologists E. H. Beaumont and T. R. Smithson describe as "pustular ornamentation".

Another distinguishing feature of S. mirus is its dentition; it jaws are lined with hundreds of small, chisel-shaped, closely spaced teeth. These marginal teeth are each about 3 millimetres (0.12 in) in cross-sectional diameter and form an unbroken row along both the upper and lower jaws. While they point directly downward in the upper jaw, the marginal teeth slant slightly inward (mesially) in the lower jaw. Teeth on the vomer bones form a second parallel row on the palate that is not as extensive as the marginal tooth row. At about 1 millimetre (0.10 cm) in diameter, these teeth are smaller than the marginal teeth. The rest of the palate has subtle pustular ornamentation at a finer scale than on the skull roof. This is a unique condition among early tetrapods, many of which have more extensive ornamentation on the palate including bony denticles, additional tooth rows, and palatal tusks. The dentition of Spathicephalus is so unusual that isolated jaw fragments with teeth in them can easily be identified.

Although the species S. pereger is only known by a partial skull roof, paleontologist Donald Baird assigned it to Spathicephalus with confidence because the shapes of its bones closely matched the corresponding bones in S. mirus. One of the few differences that separate S. pereger from S. mirus is the reticulate or "honeycomb" ornamentation on its skull roof, characterized by pits and grooves. The pustular ornamentation seen in S. mirus is in fact rare among early tetrapods (plagiosaurid temnospondyls and the very early tetrapod Ichthyostega are some of the few to have them), while the reticulate ornamentation of S. pereger is more typical.

== Evolutionary relationships ==
Spathicephalus is an early member of the group Tetrapoda, which includes all four-limbed vertebrates. According to the most recent studies of early tetrapod phylogeny, it belongs to a clade or evolutionary grouping within Tetrapoda called Baphetoidea but lies outside a subgroup of baphetoids called Baphetidae, which form the "core" of Baphetoidea. Most recent studies of tetrapod evolutionary relationships find baphetoids to be stem group tetrapods, meaning that they branched off from other tetrapods before the most recent common ancestor of living tetrapods (amphibians, reptiles, birds, and mammals) appeared. Paleontologists recognized that Spathicephalus was a close relative of baphetids ever since D. M. S. Watson first described it in 1929. Two main features link Spathicephalus with baphetids: antorbital fenestrae that have fused with the orbits, and a closed palate formed mostly from a pair of broad pterygoid bones. Watson placed Spathicephalus in Loxommatidae, a family he had named twelve years earlier to include what are now called baphetids. Although the name Baphetidae has existed since 1865 and takes precedence over Loxommatidae, paleontologists referred to these tetrapods as loxommids throughout much of the twentieth century. In a 1947 review of early tetrapods, paleontologist Alfred Romer called Spathicephalus "a grotesque type of loxommid," considering its unusual skull to be evidence of a primitive position within the group.

Spathicephalus was not included in a modern phylogenetic analysis of early tetrapod relationships until the 2000s. In 2009, paleontologists Angela Milner, Andrew Milner, and Stig Walsh incorporated the anatomical characteristics of S. mirus into an analysis of baphetoid interrelationships. The analysis placed Spathicephalus just outside Baphetidae as the sister taxon of the group, a result which they used to justify its placement in a distinct family, Spathicephalidae. The analysis also found Eucritta melanolimnetes, an older species from the Viséan stage of Scotland, to be the most basal member of Baphetoidea. Below is a cladogram showing the results of their analysis:

- Tetrapoda
  - Acanthostega
  - - Crassigyrinus
    - Baphetoidea
      - Eucritta
      - - Spathicephalidae
          - Spathicephalus
        - Baphetidae
          - Baphetinae
            - Baphetes
          - Loxommatinae
            - Loxomma acutirostris
            - - - Loxomma allmanni
                - Loxomma lintonensis
              - - Megalocephalus lineolatus
                - - Megalocephalus pachycephalus
                  - Kyrinion

=== Possible close relatives ===
The enigmatic Carboniferous tetrapod species Doragnathus woodi may be related to Spathicephalus. In two papers published in 1993 and 1994, Russian paleontologist O. A. Lebedev proposed that Doragnathus was a junior synonym of Spathicephalus. Doragnathus woodi, named by Smithson in 1980 from the Dora Open Cast Mine in Fife, Scotland (the same mine where paleontologist Stanley P. Wood discovered remains of S. mirus), is known only from upper and lower jaw fragments. The jaws themselves closely resemble those of other Carboniferous tetrapods, but the numerous very small, closely packed, pointed, and inward (lingually) curving marginal teeth they hold are unique. Given that Doragnathus and Spathicephalus were the only known Carboniferous tetrapods at the time with marginal teeth that are very small and closely packed, Lebedev argued that the two represent the same taxon. Because the Doragnathus material was smaller than every S. mirus specimen that was known at the time, he also proposed that Doragnathus represented the juvenile form of Spathicephalus and that the curved, pointed teeth of the former transformed into the straight, chizel-shaped teeth of the latter during development. However, this hypothesis was refuted by Beaumont and Smithson, who in 1998 reported a jaw of S. mirus that was just as small as the Doragnathus material but possessed straight, chizel-shaped teeth. Beaumont and Smithson also pointed out that Doragnathus differs from Spathicephalus in possessing an additional tooth row along the parasymphesial plate and coronoids (a series of bones forming the inner parts of the lower jaw of early tetrapods that was lost later in tetrapod evolution).

Another stem tetrapod, Sigournea multidentata from the Early Carboniferous of the United States, may also be related to Spathicephalus. Named in 2006 from a Visean-aged fissure fill deposit in Iowa, Sigournea is slightly older than Spathicephalus. It resembles both Spathicephalus and Doragnathus in having numerous small, closely packed teeth. Sigournea differs from Spathicephalus and resembles Doragnathus in having pointed rather than chizel-shaped marginal teeth and a second row of teeth in the lower jaws, and differs from both taxa in having a hole on the inner surface of the lower jaw called the exomeckelian fenestra. However, given that Sigournea is only known from a single lower jaw, its relationships to other tetrapods remain uncertain.

Milner et al. (2009) raised the possibility that Doragnathus woodi and Sigournea multidentata could both belong to Spathicephalidae, although they did not include the two species in their phylogenetic analysis. An earlier phylogenetic analysis published by Marcello Ruta and John R. Bolt in 2008 included Doragnathus woodi, Sigournea multidentata, and Spathicephalus mirus but did not find all three species to group together. Instead they found good support for Sigournea grouping with Occidens portlocki from the earliest Carboniferous (Tournaisian) of Ireland and Doragnathus grouping with Greererpeton burkemorani from the Viséan of West Virginia in the United States.

== Feeding behavior ==
The bizarre cranial morphology of Spathicephalus suggests that its feeding habits differed greatly from those of other Carboniferous tetrapods. Most stem tetrapods including baphetids were most likely piscivorous (fish-eating) given their large teeth and deep skulls, which provided attachment points for strong, fast-acting jaw muscles. The small chizel-shaped teeth of Spathicephalus would have been ill-suited for catching fish. Moreover, the flattened shape of its skull means that the depressor mandibulae, muscles that attach to the back of the skull and are responsible for opening the lower jaw, would not have had much room to anchor and therefore would have had poor mechanical advantage.

Although only distantly related, another group of flat-headed aquatic tetrapods called plagiosaurid temnospondyls may have resembled Spathicephalus in their feeding behavior. Plagiosaurids, which lived during the Triassic, are thought to have been bottom-dwelling piscivores that compensated for their weak depressor mandibulae with powerful adductor muscles that would have rapidly closed the lower jaw. They may have rested on the bottom of lakes and rivers with their jaws open, snapping them shut to capture fish. Paleontologist Alfred Romer proposed in 1947 that Spathicephalus was a bottom-dwelling piscivore, but unlike plagiosaurids it would have had weak adductor muscles. In Spathicephalus, plagiosaurids, and many other early tetrapods, a pair of holes at the back of the palate called the subtemporal fossae function as anchors for the adductors. These fossae are large in plagiosaurids, which is why they are thought to have had powerful adductors. Spathicephalus, however, has smaller subtemporal fossae, meaning that it would have had weak adductors and depressor mandibulae. In 1998, paleontologists E. H. Beaumont and T. R. Smithson hypothesized that Spathicephalus fed on aquatic invertebrates through a combination of suction feeding and filter feeding. To feed, it would have rested on a lake or river bottom with its jaws slightly opened and its hyoid apparatus closing off the throat. When a group of small invertebrates approached, it would have lowered its hyoid, opening the throat and causing a rapid decrease in pressure inside the mouth. Water would then flow into the mouth, carrying the prey with it. Even with weak adductors, Spathicephalus could have shut its jaws before prey escaped, and then raised the hyoid again to force water back out while filtering the invertebrates with its rows of small teeth.
