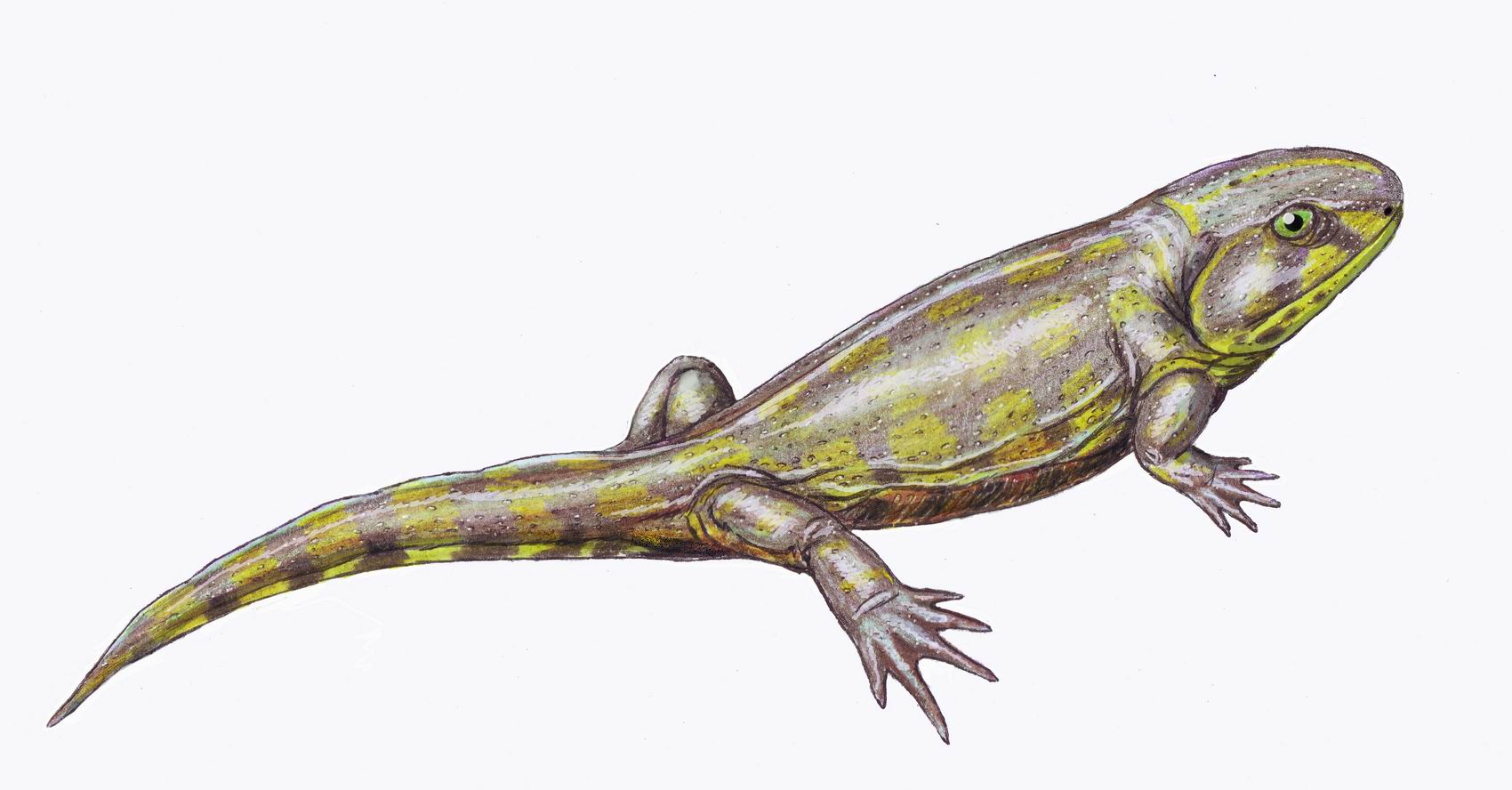
- Life restoration

Scientific classification
- Kingdom: Animalia
- Phylum: Chordata
- Clade: Stegocephali
- Genus: †Eucritta; Clack, 1998

Type species
- Eucritta melanolimnetes Clack, 1998

= Eucritta =

Eucritta Temporal range: Viséan 345.3–330.9 Ma

Extinct genus of tetrapods

Eucritta (meaning "true creature") is an extinct genus of stem-tetrapod from the Viséan epoch in the Carboniferous period of Scotland. The name of the type and only species, E. melanolimnetes ("true creature from the black lagoon") is a homage to the 1954 horror film Creature from the Black Lagoon.

Eucritta possessed many features in common with other generalized Carboniferous tetrapods and tetrapod relatives. A large amount of these features were plesiomorphic, meaning that they resembled the "primitive" condition that was acquired when four-limbed vertebrates ("amphibians", in the broad sense) first appeared. With a short, wide skull, large eyes, and strongly-built limbs, Eucritta proportionally resembled Balanerpeton, a contemporary terrestrial tetrapod which was one of the earliest members of Temnospondyli, a successful tetrapod group which may have produced modern amphibians. However, Eucritta lacked key temnospondyl adaptations, while also not showing certain adaptations of reptiliomorphs (the tetrapod lineage that would lead to reptiles and other amniotes). In other cases, it possesses certain characteristics in common with each. Its closest relatives may have been baphetids such as Megalocephalus, based on the possession of slight embayments on the front edge of the eye sockets.

Eucritta's mosaic possession of characters seen in baphetids, "anthracosaurs" (early reptiliomorphs), and temnospondyls suggests that these three groups diverged in the Carboniferous rather than earlier, in the Devonian. Its limb proportions support terrestrial preferences while skeletal features suggest that it utilized buccal pumping, the type of breathing used by modern amphibians.

== Discovery ==
Eucritta is known from five specimens. These specimens have only been recovered from Unit 82, a Viséan-epoch layer of black shale found at the East Kirkton Quarry of Scotland. Four of these specimens were described by English paleontologist Jenny Clack in a 1998 edition of Nature. The most well-preserved specimen, UMZC T1347, is a crushed but fairly complete skeleton and skull split between two slabs. This specimen has been designated the holotype of the genus. A second specimen, UMZC T1348, contains only a skull, which is larger than that of the holotype. Both of these specimens were discovered by famed Scottish fossil collector Stan Wood in 1988. Wood also discovered another large and well-preserved skull, NMS 1992.14, in 1989. The smallest specimen, and the earliest to be discovered, was UMZC 1285, a small skull and the front half of a torso. This specimen was discovered by Robert Clack in 1985. By the time of Eucritta's more comprehensive 2001 description courtesy of Jenny Clack, a fifth specimen had been discovered. This fifth specimen, discovered by Stan Wood, was a partial skull and torso designated UMZC 2000.1.

== Description ==
=== Skull ===
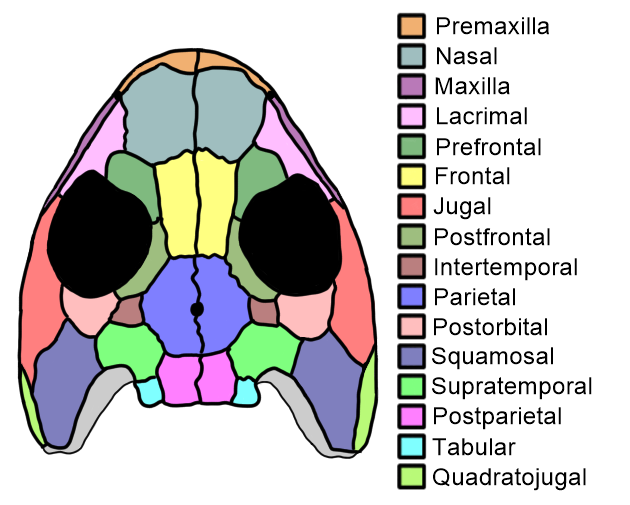
Skull diagram

The skull was broad, with a short, rounded snout and large orbits (eye sockets) positioned close together. Skulls ranged from around 30 mm (1.2 inches) in the smallest specimen to around 90 mm (3.5 inches) in the largest. Individual skull bones had subtle radiating ridges visible at their edges and small pits in their center. Eucritta had 38-40 teeth in the upper jaw, and the teeth were largest shortly after the front of the jaw (around teeth 7 to 14). Some larger specimens had subtle, rounded notches at the outer front corner of each orbit. These notches, formally known as anteroventral embayments, develop further in baphetid stem-tetrapods like Megalocephalus and Loxomma, giving them keyhole-shaped orbits. Otherwise, the front portion of the skull is fairly typical in Eucritta, similar to that of the contemporary early temnospondyl Balanerpeton.

The rear of the skull is more characteristic. This region is broad, possessing large and rounded temporal notches, although these notches are not as wide as the orbits. The skull possesses all of the bones which characterize early tetrapods, even the often-lost intertemporal bone. Most of the edge of each temporal notch is formed by the curved supratemporal bone rather than the squamosal, similar to baphetids but unlike Balanerpeton. Each supratemporal contacts a postparietal at the rear edge of the skull, a plesiomorphic feature in contrast to "anthracosaurs" which allow the parietal and tabular bones to contact instead. The postorbital bone is rounded and smoothly crescent-shaped, in contrast to the larger and more angular bone of Balanerpeton.

The palate (roof of the mouth) was closed up by bone, lacking the large interpterygoid vacuities characteristic of temnospondyls. The palate was covered with striations and tiny tooth-like structures known as denticles. The broad front portion of the palate also possessed evidence for large fangs on the vomer and palatine bones. The parabasisphenoid (base of the braincase, towards the rear of the palate) is triangular and also covered with denticles. The mandibles are not well-preserved in any specimen, but seemingly lacked any unusual features.

=== Postcranial skeleton ===
The pectoral (shoulder) girdle was robust. The cleithrum was long and blade-like, the scapulocoracoid was shaped like a reversed B, and the interclavicle was lozenge-shaped as in other early tetrapods and stem-tetrapods. The clavicles were unusually shaped, with a curved lower portion continuous with a tapering upper blade. The angle of curvature at the lower portion ranges from 45 degrees in the smallest specimen (UMZC 1285), to ~ 30 degrees in the holotype. The humerus (forearm bone) is flat and irregularly shaped, similar to the "L-shaped" humeri of most early tetrapods and stem-tetrapods (particularly Baphetes), but not the thinner, hourglass-shaped humeri of temnospondyls and amniote relatives. The ulna and radius (lower arm bones) are short and tubular, with the ulna being longer and having a moderately developed olecranon process. The hands are not complete in any specimen, but triangular unguals ("claw" bones) were present.

Only the holotype specimen preserves the rear half of the torso. The pelvic (hip) girdle was fairly typical by early tetrapod and stem-tetrapod standards, with a two-pronged ilium, a plate-like ischium, and no bony pubis. The leg bones were rectangular and the five-toed feet had a phalangeal formula (number of joints per toe) of 2-3-4-5-?. None of the specimens preserve a complete vertebral column, but based on the number of ribs the body was probably rather short and squat. The dorsal (trunk) ribs themselves were only slightly curved and shorter and more tapering near the pelvic area. The cervical (neck) ribs, on the other hand, were long and expanded at their tips, and this expansion also occurs in the first few dorsal ribs. Rows of needle-like belly scutes known as gastralia converge at the midline of the body.

== Paleobiology ==
Due to multiple specimens of various sizes preserving skull material, Eucritta was one of only a few Carboniferous stegocephalians known from a growth series. Most of the skull experienced isometric growth (i.e. the proportions stayed relatively consistent), though the orbits experienced negative allometric growth (i.e. they became proportionally smaller in larger specimens). Apparently Eucritta lived in the habitat preserved at East Kirkton during multiple life stages, while its contemporaries (such as Balanerpeton) only lived there as adults. Eucritta had fairly long and well-developed limbs, which may indicate a decent degree of terrestriality. The femur (thigh bone) was 45% the length of the skull, comparable to the ratio in its contemporaries Eldeceeon (47%) and Balanerpeton (~ 50%).

Eucritta has several characteristics which suggest that it utilized buccal pumping. This form of breathing, also utilized by modern amphibians, uses neck muscles to inflate the mouth with air and then pump air into and out of the lungs. A short, broad skull and straight ribs are generally considered to correspond to this form of breathing, and they are features present in Eucritta. Several other East Kirkton stegocephalians, such as Eldeceeon and Silvanerpeton, have taller skulls and more drastically curved ribs. This suggests that they used costal ventilation, a form of breathing based on inflating and deflating the lungs using the ribs and/or a diaphragm. Costal ventilation is utilized by modern amniotes like mammals, reptiles, and birds.

== Classification ==
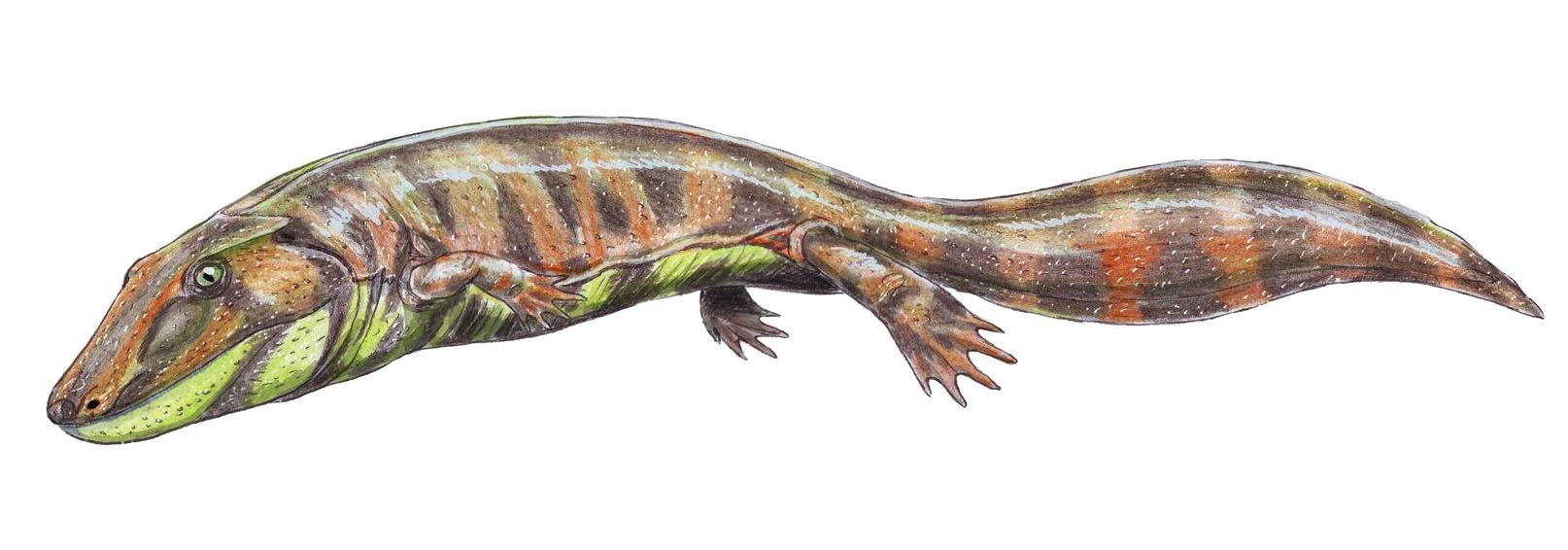
Eucritta may have been a close relative of baphetids like Loxomma

Eucritta was already recognized as a unique animal in its original 1998 description. A phylogenetic analysis provided in the description often found it close to baphetids, but groups at and around the base of crown-Tetrapoda were not stable in their position. The most parsimonious family tree tentatively placed Eucritta and baphetids closer to "anthracosaurs" than to temnospondyls.

The more comprehensive 2001 description added the reptile-like tetrapod Gephyrostegus to the 1998 paper's phylogenetic analysis, and made several more edits and corrections. In response, Eucritta and the baphetids shifted their position, and a connection to temnospondyls became equally parsimonious. Clack commented that most of the connections between Eucritta, baphetids, and "anthracosaurs" were "plesiomorphies, ambiguous, or reversals". Ruta, Coates, and Quicke (2003)'s analysis of the tetrapod family tree placed Eucritta alone at the base of Temnospondyli. However, they also admitted that it would not be unlikely for it to have a variety of other positions scattered around the base of crown-Tetrapoda (the group encompassing the ancestors of all modern tetrapods, typically including temnospondyls and reptiliomorphs). When certain traits are emphasized through implied weighting, Eucritta is connected to baphetids as part of a branch immediately basal to crown-Tetrapoda. A 2009 restudy of Baphetes assigned the name Baphetoidea to the branch incorporating baphetids, Eucritta, and the unusual filter-feeding stem tetrapod Spathicephalus.

Ruta and Coates' 2007 revision of their earlier analysis further supported this position next to baphetids and basal to crown-Tetrapoda. Many subsequent studies have cemented this position, although some instability still exists. In the 2016 description of five new stegocephalians by Clack, Bennett, Carpenter, Davies, Fraser, Kearsey, Marshall, Millward, Otoo, Reeves, Ross, Ruta, Smithson, and Walsh, Eucritta was removed from Baphetoidea, and consistently found to be either the most basal reptiliomorph or most basal temnospondyl (placing Lissamphibia somewhere within Temnospondyli; so in other words, the most basal batrachomorph and amphibian). Marjanovic and Laurin's 2019 deconstruction of Ruta and Coates (2007) sometimes agreed with their interpretation, although under quite a few cases they placed the family Colosteidae next to Baphetidae, separating Eucritta from the baphetids. Temnospondyli complicates things further, as some family trees found by the 2019 study place temnospondyls as derived from the Eucritta + Colosteidae + Baphetidae clade, while others had temnospondyls branch off later, after certain supposed "anthracosaurs" (particularly embolomeres) had already evolved. Regardless of its position, Eucritta did not drift far from the common ancestry of baphetids, colosteids, temnospondyls, and "anthracosaurs".
