= Sigournea =

Sigournea Temporal range: Early Carboniferous, 335 Ma

Scientific classification
- Domain: Eukaryota
- Kingdom: Animalia
- Phylum: Chordata
- Clade: Tetrapoda
- Class: incertae sedis
- Genus: †Sigournea; Bolt and Lombard, 2006

Type species
- †Sigournea multidentata Bolt and Lombard, 2006

Extinct genus of tetrapods

Sigournea is a genus of stem tetrapod from the Early Carboniferous. The genus contains only one species, the type species Sigournea multidentata, which was named in 2006 by paleontologists John R. Bolt and R. Eric Lombard on the basis of a single lower jaw from Iowa. The jaw came from a fissure-fill deposit of the St. Louis Limestone that was exposed in a quarry near the town of Sigourney and dates to the Viséan stage, making it approximately 335 million years old. Bolt and Lombard named the genus after Sigourney. The species name multidentata alludes to the many teeth preserved in the jaw. The jaw, which is housed in the Field Museum and cataloged as FM PR 1820, curves strongly downward but was probably straight to begin with, having been deformed by the process of fossilization after the individual died. Rooted in the dentary bone along the outermost edge of the jaw are 88 small, pointed marginal teeth. An additional row of even smaller teeth runs along the coronoids, three bones positioned lengthwise along the lower boundary of the dentary on the inner surface of the lower jaw. Bolt and Lombard were able to classify Sigournea as an early member of Tetrapoda based on the presence of bone surfaces covered in pits and ridges, a single row of dentary teeth, a jaw joint that faces upward, and an open groove for a lateral line along the outer surface of the jaw, and on the absence of teeth on the prearticular bone or enlarged fangs on the coronoids. Sigournea differs from other stem tetrapods in having several holes within a depression called the exomeckelian fenestra on the inner surface of the jaw.

The closest relatives of Sigournea within Tetrapoda are unknown. Bolt and Lombard did not include it in a phylogenetic analysis in their 2006 description because they thought the single known jawbone did not possess enough unique anatomical characteristics to elucidate its evolutionary relationships. However, in 2008, Bolt and his colleague Marcello Ruta published a phylogenetic analysis that did include Sigournea, and found good support for S. multidentata grouping with Occidens portlocki, a species of stem tetrapod named in 2004 from the earliest Carboniferous (Tournaisian) of Northern Ireland. Milner et al. (2009) suggested that Sigournea may be a close relative of the slightly younger baphetoid tetrapod Spathicephalus from Scotland and Nova Scotia based on the presence of small, closely packed marginal teeth in both taxa. However, their proposition was tentative because they did not include Sigournea in their phylogenetic analysis.
