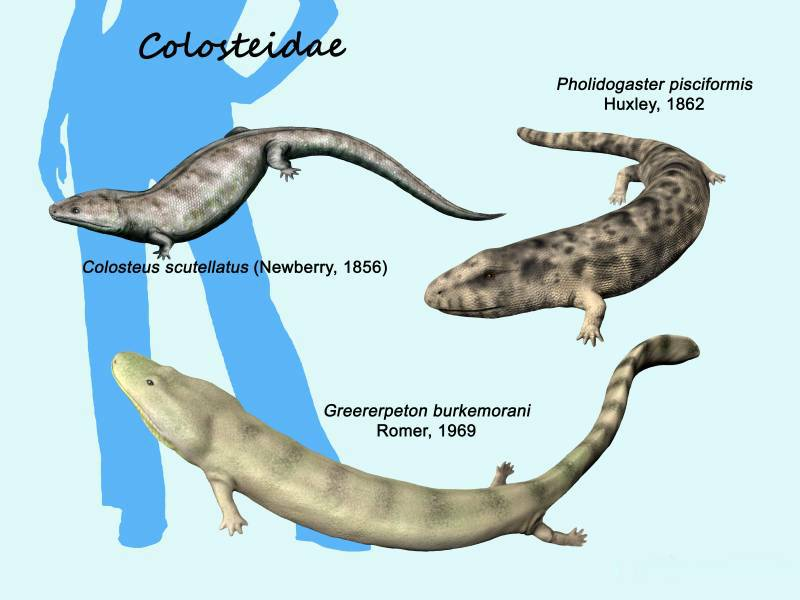
- Life restoration and size comparation of three members of Colosteidae

Scientific classification
- Kingdom: Animalia
- Phylum: Chordata
- Clade: Stegocephali
- Family: †Colosteidae; Cope, 1875

Type genus
- †Colosteus Cope, 1871

Genera
- †Colosteus; †Deltaherpeton; †Greererpeton; †Pholidogaster

= Colosteidae =

Colosteidae Temporal range: Carboniferous (Viséan–late Moscovian)

Extinct family of tetrapodomorphs

Colosteidae is a family of stegocephalians (stem-group tetrapods) that lived in the Carboniferous period. They possessed a variety of characteristics from different tetrapod or stem-tetrapod groups, which made them historically difficult to classify. They are now considered to be part of a lineage intermediate between the earliest Devonian terrestrial vertebrates (such as Ichthyostega), and the different groups ancestral to all modern tetrapods, such as temnospondyls (probably ancestral to modern amphibians) and reptiliomorphs (ancestral to amniotes such as mammals, reptiles, and birds).

== Description ==
Colosteids had elongated bodies, with an estimated 40 vertebrae, not including the tail. The skull is relatively flat and composed of many separate bones, like that of other stegocephalians. Colosteids lacked otic notches at the back of the head, unlike temnospondyls and other "labyrinthodonts". However, they did possess large mandibular and palatal fangs (on the lower jaw and the roof of the mouth), in addition to smaller marginal teeth (at the edge of the mouth), like "labyrinthodonts". The skull was overlaid with wide sensory grooves known as lateral lines, which extended from rear edge of the skull to the tip of the snout. Most aquatic stegocephalians have their lateral lines dip, unbroken, under the nostrils once they reach the tip of the snout, or alternately disconnect into separate grooves separated by the nostrils. However, colosteids evolved a unique alternative; their lateral lines droop below the nostrils so far that they contact the marginal teeth, so that the edge of the skull is responsible for subdividing the grooves, rather than the nostrils.

The mandibular fangs were larger than the palatal ones, though those on the palate were still large. Colosteids were unique compared to most stegocephalians in the fact that a pair of palatal fangs were present on the premaxillary bones at the tip of the snout. In conjunction with the forward position of these fangs, the dentary bones of the lower jaw developed a notch on either side near the symphysis (chin). The symphysis itself is formed by a rough area of bone on the left and right dentaries. This rough patch is formed by a complex system of ridges, which have been described as "brassicate" (textured like a cauliflower). Only Megalocephalus is known to share this brassicate patch with colosteids. The mandibles were also unique in the fact that they possessed a single elongated hole along their inner surface, known as an exomeckelian foramen (or a meckelian fenestra). Earlier stegocephalians like Ichthyostega possessed a subtle slit in the mandible, while most later groups had a series of smaller, well-defined holes.

== Relationships ==
The analysis below was conducted by Swartz in 2012, showing the relationship of colosteids with other tetrapodomorphs.

- Elpistostegalia
  - Panderichthys
  - Stegocephalia
    - - Elpistostege
      - Tiktaalik
    - - Elginerpeton
      - - Ventastega
        - - Acanthostega
          - - Ichthyostega
            - - Whatcheeriidae
              - - Colosteidae
                - - Crassigyrinus
                  - - Baphetidae
                    - Crown group Tetrapoda

The following cladogram represents the results of Igielman (2026):

- Tetrapodomorpha
  - †Eusthenopteron
  - - †Tiktaalik
    - - †Ichthyostega
      - - †Acanthostega
        - - †Whatcheeriidae
          - - †Embolomeri
            - †Colosteidae
            - - †Westlothiana
              - †Aistopoda
            - - †Baphetoidea
              - crown-group Tetrapoda
                - Temnospondyli (including Lissamphibia, i.e. modern amphibians)
                - - †Seymouriamorpha
                  - - †Recumbirostra
                    - - †Diadectomorpha
                      - - †Captorhinidae
                        - Amniota (including modern mammals, reptiles and birds)
