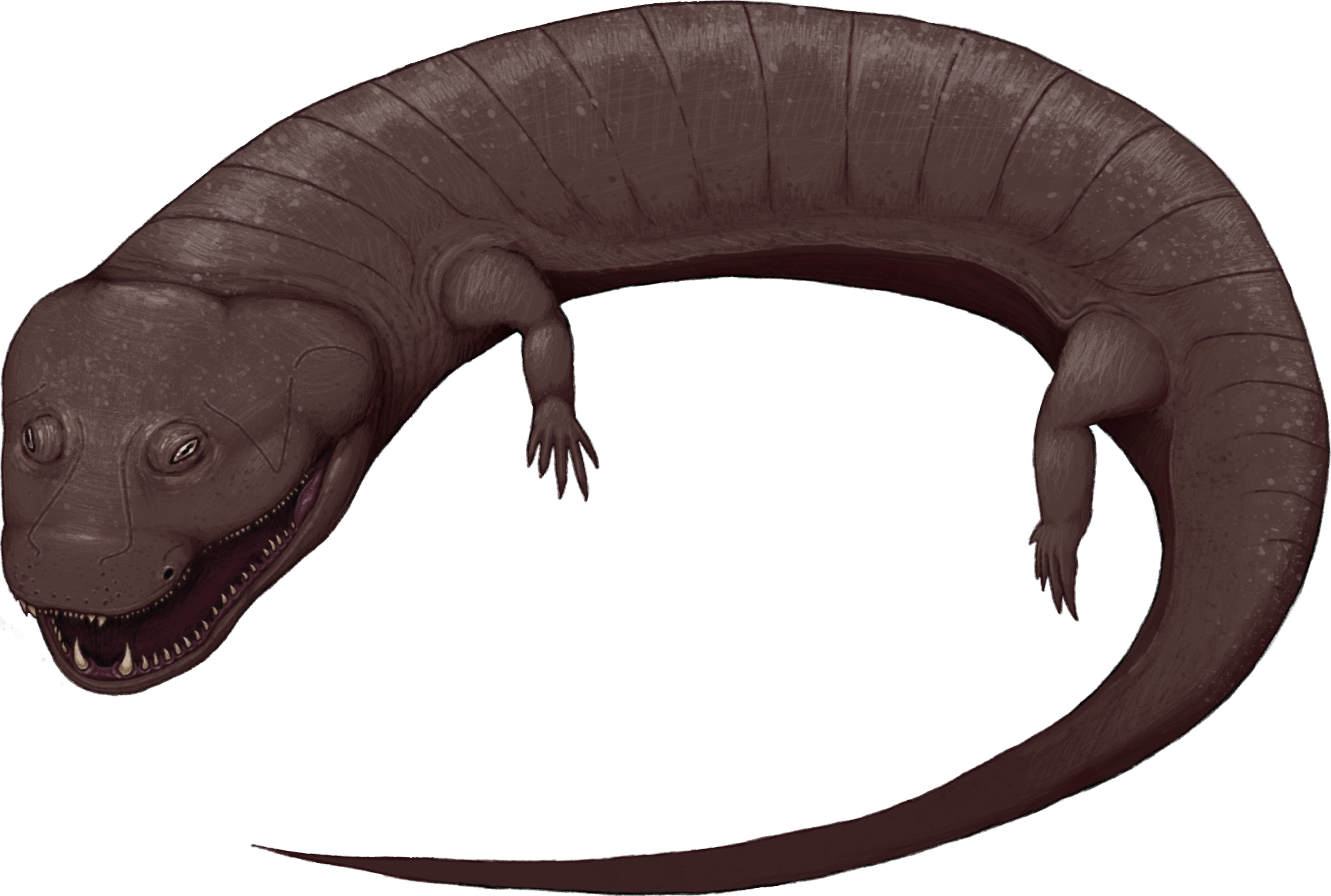
- Life restoration

Scientific classification
- Domain: Eukaryota
- Kingdom: Animalia
- Phylum: Chordata
- Clade: Sarcopterygii
- Clade: Tetrapodomorpha
- Clade: Stegocephali
- Family: †Colosteidae
- Genus: †Deltaherpeton; Bolt & Lombard, 2010

Species
- D. hiemstrae Bolt & Lombard, 2010 (type)

= Deltaherpeton =

Deltaherpeton Temporal range: 330 Ma

Extinct genus of tetrapodomorphs

Deltaherpeton is an extinct genus of colosteid from middle Mississippian (late Viséan age) deposits of Delta, Iowa, United States. It was first named by John R. Bolt and R. Eric Lombard in 2010 and the type species is Deltaherpeton hiemstrae.

Deltaherpeton can be differentiated from other colosteids due to possessing several unique bones along the midline of the skull, separating paired skull bones which typically contact each other along the midline. These include an internasal, an oval-shaped bone which lies at the intersection of the paired premaxillae and nasal bones at the top of the snout. Internasals are known from several of the earliest four-limbed vertebrates, such as Acanthostega, Ichthyostega, and baphetids. Further back, what seems to be a pair of lozenge-shape bones lie at the intersection of the nasal bones and frontal bones. These bones may be interfrontonasals, which have been found in some eryopoids and microsaurs.

In addition, Deltaherpeton has a single postparietal (rather than a pair), which separates the left and right supratemporal and tabular bones at the rear edge of the skull. Lone postparietals are rare among non-amniote tetrapods and tetrapod relatives; only Ichthyostega and diadectomorphs are known to possess them. The discovery of Deltaherpeton prompted a review and re-augmentation of the defining characteristics for the family Colosteidae, though it did not help to clarify the relationship between colosteids and other early tetrapods.

Though it is believed that Deltaherpeton is more derived, the species is thought to have shared its environment with other early four-limbed vertebrates such as Whatcheeria, approximately 339.4 to 336 million years ago.
