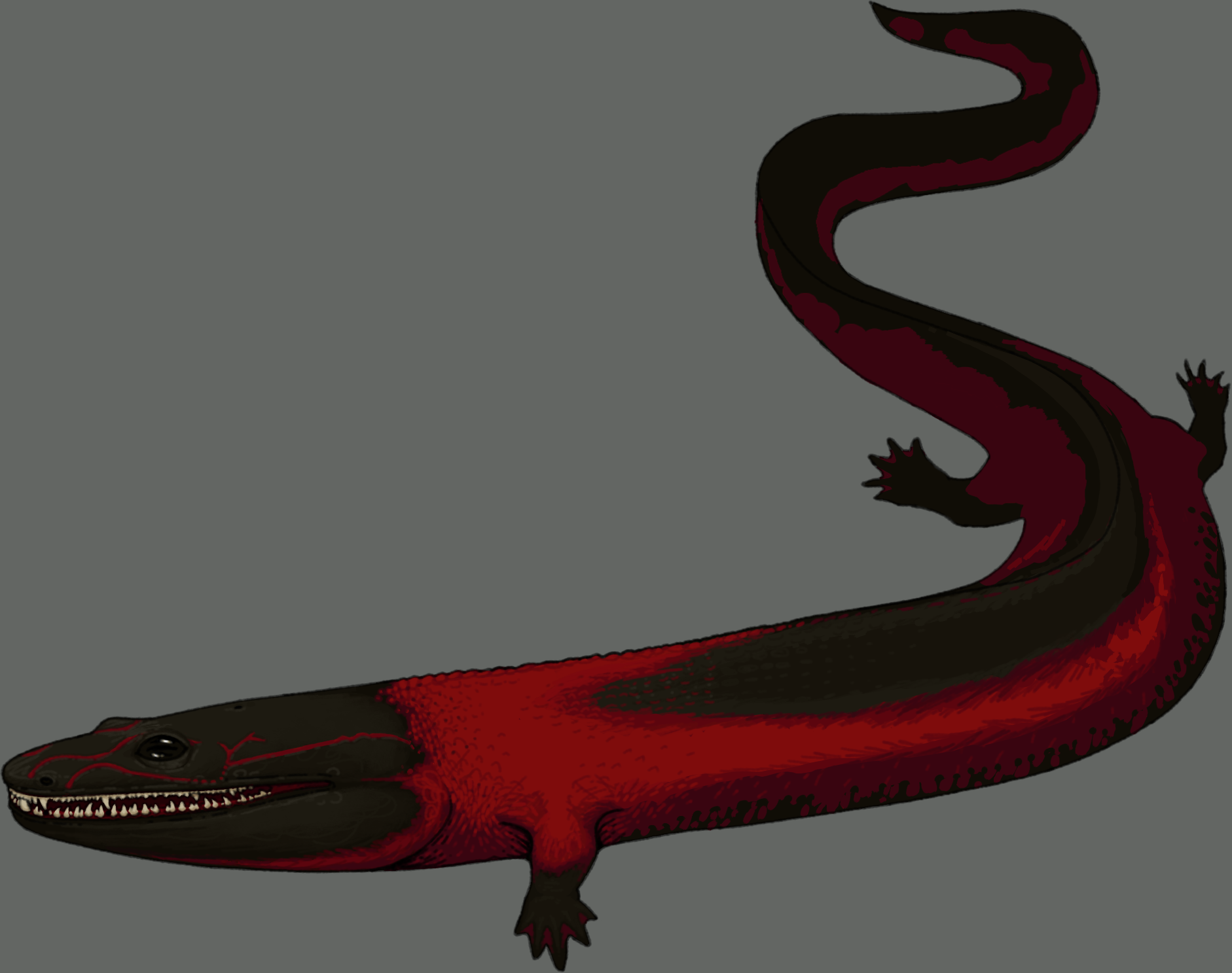

Scientific classification
- Kingdom: Animalia
- Phylum: Chordata
- Family: †Colosteidae
- Genus: †Colosteus; Cope, 1871
- Species: †C. scutellatus

Binomial name
- †Colosteus scutellatus Newberry, 1856 (as Pygopterus scutellatus)

Synonyms
- Pygopterus scutellatus Newberry, 1856; Colosteus crassicutatus Cope, 1869; Colosteus pauciradiatus Cope, 1871 (nomen nudum); Sauropleura scutellata Cope, 1897; Sauropleura pauciradiata Cope, 1897; Sauropleura longidentata Moodie, 1909; Macrerpeton deani Cope, 1916

= Colosteus =

Colosteus Temporal range: Late Carboniferous, 307.1–305 Ma

Extinct genus of tetrapodomorphs

Colosteus is an extinct genus of colosteid tetrapod from the Late Carboniferous (late Westphalian stage) of Ohio. Its remains have been found at the Linton site in Saline Township, Ohio, where it is one of the most common tetrapods, and at the Five Points site in Mahoning County, Ohio. It was an elongate, aquatic form with a flattened and pointed head, greatly reduced limbs, two premaxillary tusks, and heavy scalation. It would have reached about 1 m (3.2 ft) in length.

It was originally described by John Strong Newberry in 1856 as a new species of the palaeonisciform fish genus Pygopterus. In 1869, Edward Drinker Cope erected a new genus of "batrachian", Colosteus, containing the species C. crassicutatus, C. foveatus, and C. marshii, based on Linton material lent to him by Newberry. Cope later realized that the holotype of his Colosteus crassicutatus was also the holotype of Newberry's earlier Pygopterus scutellatus, and combined the two as Colosteus scutellatus. Colosteus foveatus was later determined to be a junior synonym of Isodectes obtusus, and Colosteus marshii was given its own genus, Ptyonius.
