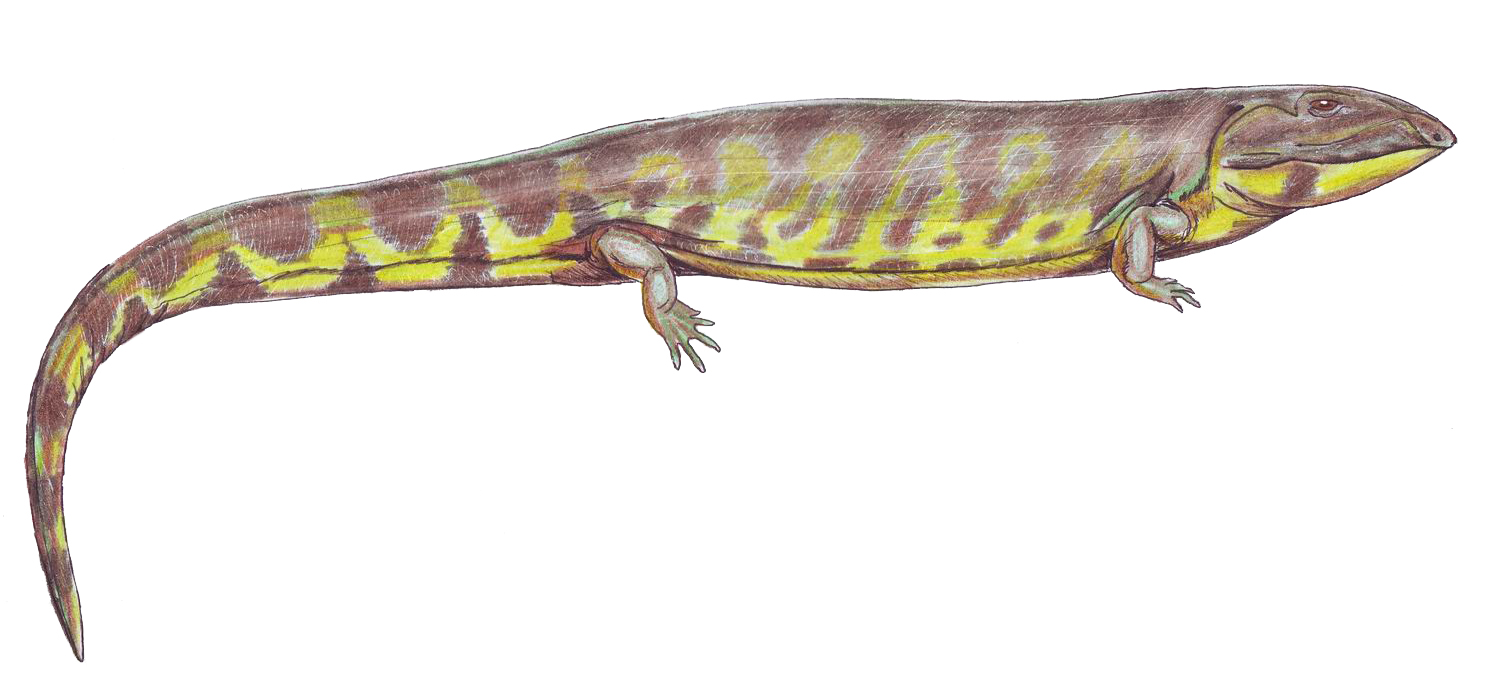

Scientific classification
- Kingdom: Animalia
- Phylum: Chordata
- Clade: Stegocephali
- Family: †Colosteidae
- Genus: †Pholidogaster; Huxley, 1862
- Species: †P. pisciformes

Binomial name
- †Pholidogaster pisciformes Huxley, 1862

= Pholidogaster =

Pholidogaster Temporal range: Viséan to Serpukhovian 345.3–318.1 Ma

Extinct genus of tetrapodomorphs

Pholidogaster ('scaly stomach') is an extinct genus of stem-tetrapod that lived during the Middle Carboniferous period (late Viséan to early Serpukhovian). Pholidogaster is known from only two specimens found in Gilmerton, Scotland. Historically it was one of the first to show science the evolutionary link between fish and amphibians.

This animal had a very long and slender body, with small and feeble limbs. The shoulder structure is further back than is usual. Belly scales are present (hence its name), suggesting that in life it did not just swim, but scrawled over hard surfaces as well. The structure of the jaw is not clear, since the jaw bones on both specimens are not well preserved. However, there are large fangs in the front of the mouth, presumably used in hunting. It was a small to medium-sized animal around 1 m in length.
