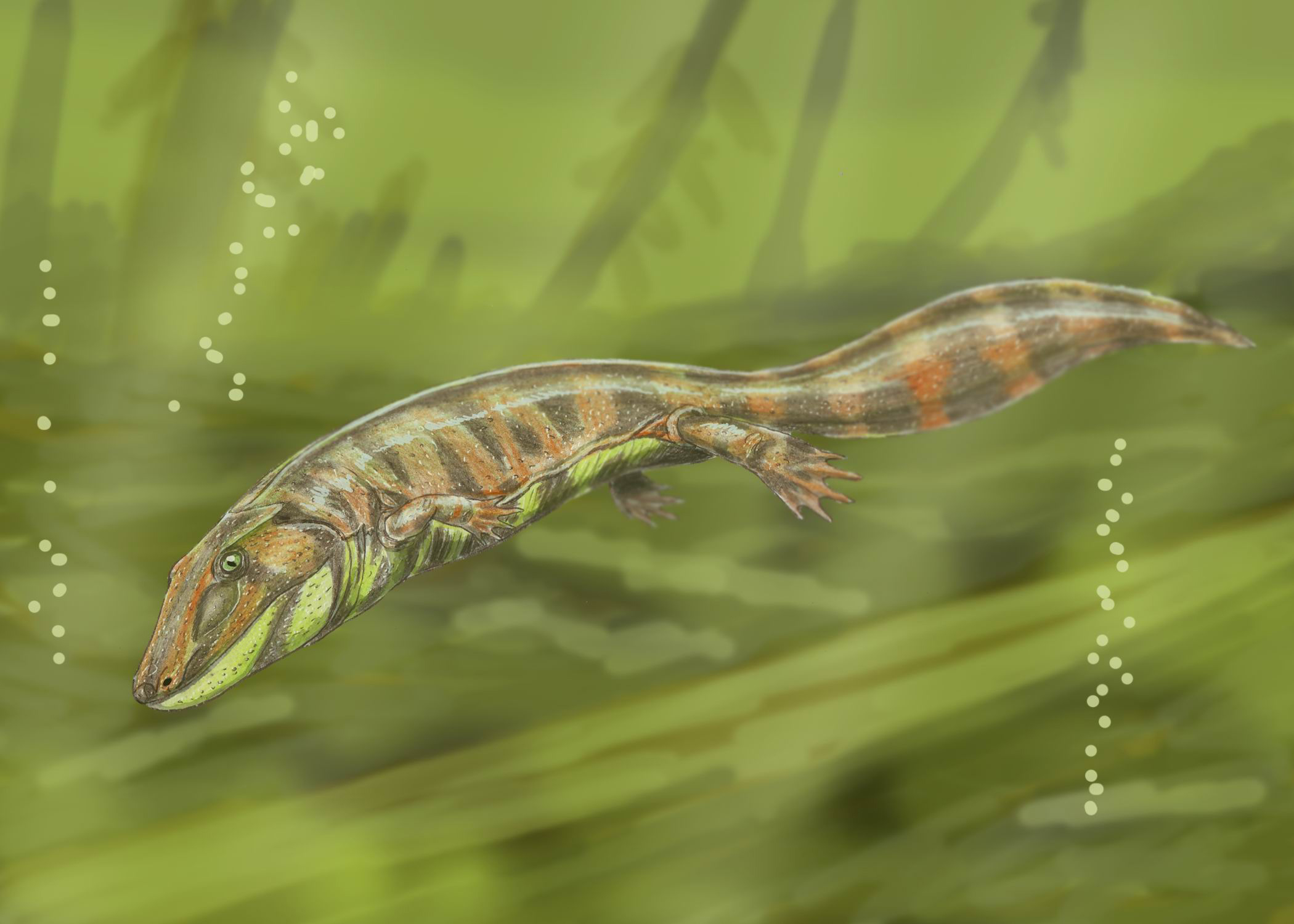
- Life restoration of Loxomma

Scientific classification
- Kingdom: Animalia
- Phylum: Chordata
- Clade: Stegocephali
- Superfamily: †Baphetoidea; Cope, 1875

Families and genera
- †Eucritta; †Spathicephalus; †Baphetidae

Synonyms
- Loxommatoidea Watson, 1929

= Baphetoidea =

Baphetoidea Temporal range: 326–307 Ma Early to Late Carboniferous

Extinct superfamily of tetrapodomorphs

Baphetoidea is a superfamily of stem-tetrapods. It includes the family Baphetidae and several more basal genera such as Eucritta and Spathicephalus (which has been given its own family Spathicephalidae). The superfamily has also been called Loxommatoidea, but this name is a junior synonym of Baphetoidea.

== Taxonomy ==
Baphetoidea was named by Edward Drinker Cope in 1875. The name Loxommatoidea was erected by D.M.S. Watson in 1929 for baphetids such as Loxomma, which were then known as loxommatids. Loxommatids were later shown to be members of Baphetidae, and Loxommatoidea was synonymized with Baphetoidea as a result. Because Baphetoidea was the first erected name, it has priority over Loxommatoidea.

Baphetioids have been suggested to be stem-group tetrapods. The following cladogram represents the results of Igielman (2026):

- Tetrapodomorpha
  - †Eusthenopteron
  - - †Tiktaalik
    - - †Ichthyostega
      - - †Acanthostega
        - - †Whatcheeriidae
          - - †Embolomeri
            - †Colosteidae
            - - †Westlothiana
              - †Aistopoda
            - - †Baphetoidea
              - crown-group Tetrapoda
                - Temnospondyli (including Lissamphibia, i.e. modern amphibians)
                - - †Seymouriamorpha
                  - - †Recumbirostra
                    - - †Diadectomorpha
                      - - †Captorhinidae
                        - Amniota (including modern mammals, reptiles and birds)
