= Kyrinion =

Kyrinion Temporal range: Late Carboniferous

Scientific classification
- Kingdom: Animalia
- Phylum: Chordata
- Family: †Baphetidae
- Subfamily: †Loxommatinae
- Genus: †Kyrinion; Clack, 2003

Species
- †K. martilli Clack, 2003 (type)

Extinct genus of tetrapodomorphs

Kyrinion is an extinct genus of baphetid tetrapodomorph from the Late Carboniferous of England. It is known from a skull that was found in Tyne and Wear county dating back to the Westphalian stage. Along with the skull is part of the lower jaw, an arch of the atlas bone (the vertebra that connects to the skull) and a rib possibly belonging to a cervical (neck) vertebra. The type species K. martilli was named from this material in 2003.

== Description ==
The holotype skull of Kyrinion is well preserved with the back of the skull and both stapes, or ear bones, intact. The orbits, or eye sockets, are somewhat triangular in shape. Areas connecting the palate with the jaws and braincase make the skull inflexible. Lateral lines, used for sensory perception in aquatic environments, are present on the quadratojugal bone behind the eyes. The lower jaw lacks the distinctive features of some other baphetids, such as teeth on the parasymphysial plate, a piece of bone that overlies the dentary symphysis.

== Classification ==
Kyrinion is a member of the family Baphetidae, a group of large aquatic tetrapodomorphs that somewhat resembled salamanders. Among baphetids, Kyrinion is most closely related to Loxomma and Megalocephalus. In 2009, all three genera were placed within the newly erected subfamily Loxommatinae.

== Discovery ==
The holotype skull of Kyrinion was found embedded in a piece of ironstone by paleontologist David Martill in 1993. Martill found the rock on a beach at Whitley Bay and noticed part of an exposed bone. In 2003, after extensive preparation of the holotype, paleontologist Jennifer A. Clack described the specimen and named the species after Martill. It is now housed in the Hancock Museum in Newcastle upon Tyne.
