= Baphetes =

Baphetes Temporal range: Carboniferous

Scientific classification
- Domain: Eukaryota
- Kingdom: Animalia
- Phylum: Chordata
- Clade: Sarcopterygii
- Clade: Tetrapodomorpha
- Family: †Baphetidae
- Subfamily: †Baphetinae; Milner et al. 2009
- Genus: †Baphetes; Owen 1854

Species
- †B. planiceps Owen 1854 (type); †B. bohemicus; †B. kirkbyi; †B. orientalis Milner et al. 2009

Extinct genus of tetrapodomorphs

Baphetes is an extinct genus of stem-tetrapod from the Pennine Coal Measures Group and Parrot Coal, England, the Joggins Formation of Nova Scotia, and the Kladno Formation of the Czech Republic. It was first named by Richard Owen in 1854. The type species is B. planiceps.

Species B. lintonensis is transferred to genus Loxomma.
