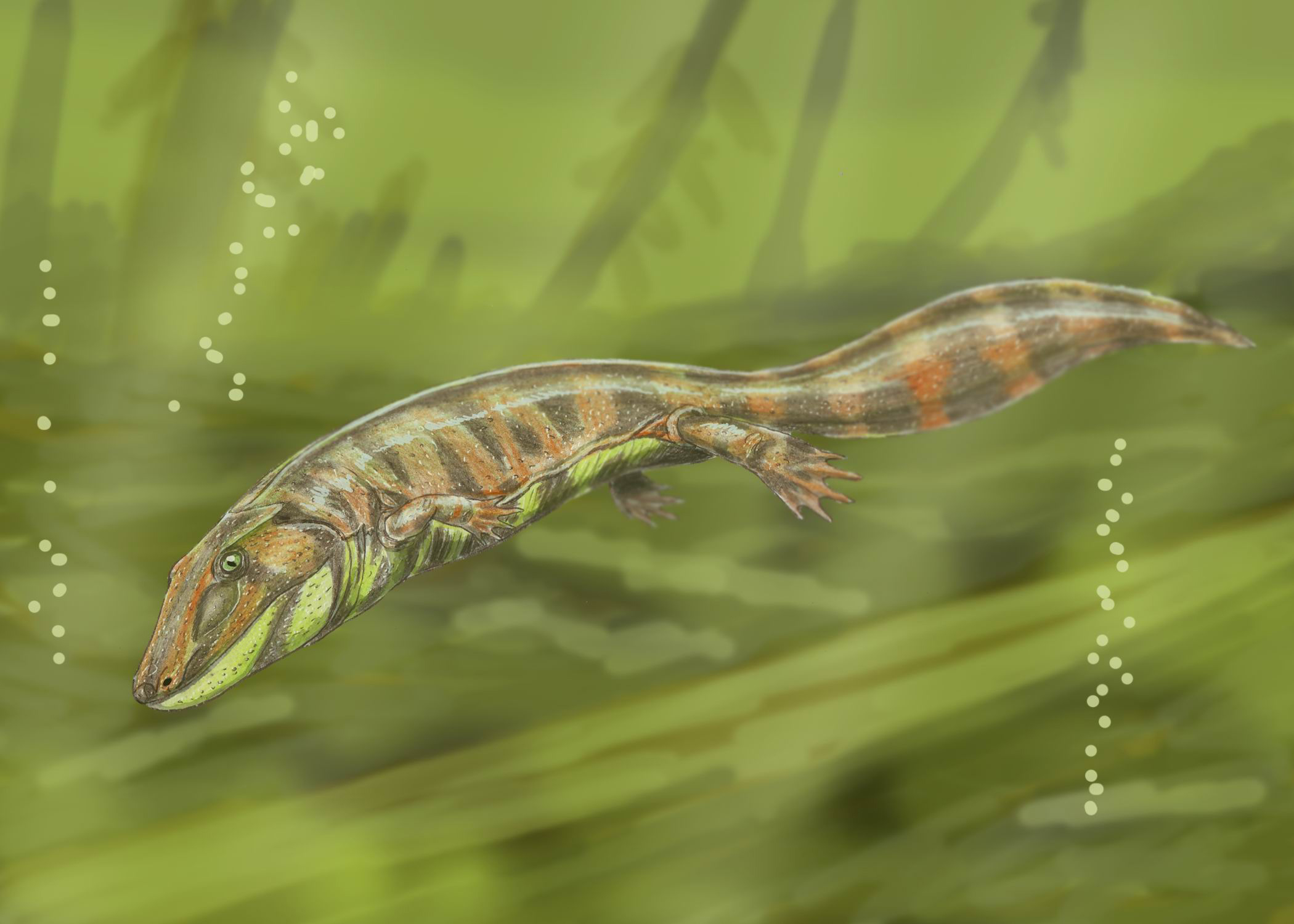
- Life restoration of Loxomma

Scientific classification
- Kingdom: Animalia
- Phylum: Chordata
- Superfamily: †Baphetoidea
- Family: †Baphetidae; Cope, 1865

Subgroups
- †Baphetes; †Loxommatinae Lydekker, 1889; †Kyrinion; †Loxomma; †Megalocephalus

Synonyms
- Loxommatidae

= Baphetidae =

Baphetids Temporal range: 326–307 Ma Late Carboniferous

Extinct family of tetrapodomorphs

Baphetidae is an extinct family of stem-tetrapods. Baphetids were large labyrinthodont predators of the Late Carboniferous period (Namurian through Westphalian) of Europe. Fragmentary remains from the Early Carboniferous of Canada have been tentatively assigned to the group. The phylogenetic relationships of baphetids is uncertain; while many studies have placed the group as a close relative of Amniota, other analyses have found Baphetidae to be a more basal clade of early stem tetrapods. Baphetids were among the first of the Carboniferous fossil tetrapods to be found and were originally described in 1850 by John William Dawson. The baphetids have been referred to the family Loxommatidae, but this group was later shown to be a junior synonym of Baphetidae, which was named earlier in 1865. Baphetids are known mainly from skulls; very little postcranial material has been found.

== Palaeobiology ==
The presence of lateral lines and the long rows of needle-like teeth show that most were fish-eaters. Their development was likely amphibian, though no larval fossils are known. Their best-known characteristic was a curious, keyhole-shaped orbit formed by excavation of the lacrimal and prefrontal bones in front of the eye. It has been suggested that this space accommodated a salt gland or some kind of electrosensory organ. Perhaps the better hypothesis is that the space allowed room for the contraction of an enlarged pterygoideus muscle. In that case, this skull modification would represent an early form of skull fenestration for jaw muscles.

The skull is shallow. Unlike the better-known embolomeres, the baphetid cheek and skull roof are sutured together. There is a strongly embayed spiracular ("otic") notch, but the stapes is distally broad, which seems to rule out a sensitive hearing apparatus. The palate is closed—a primitive character, but very different from the temnospondyls. The coronoids bear no teeth or denticles, while the dentary has a double tooth row.

Since the taxon is based almost exclusively on skulls, the body is very poorly known. It is often said that the body was crocodile-like, but this appears to be largely supposition.

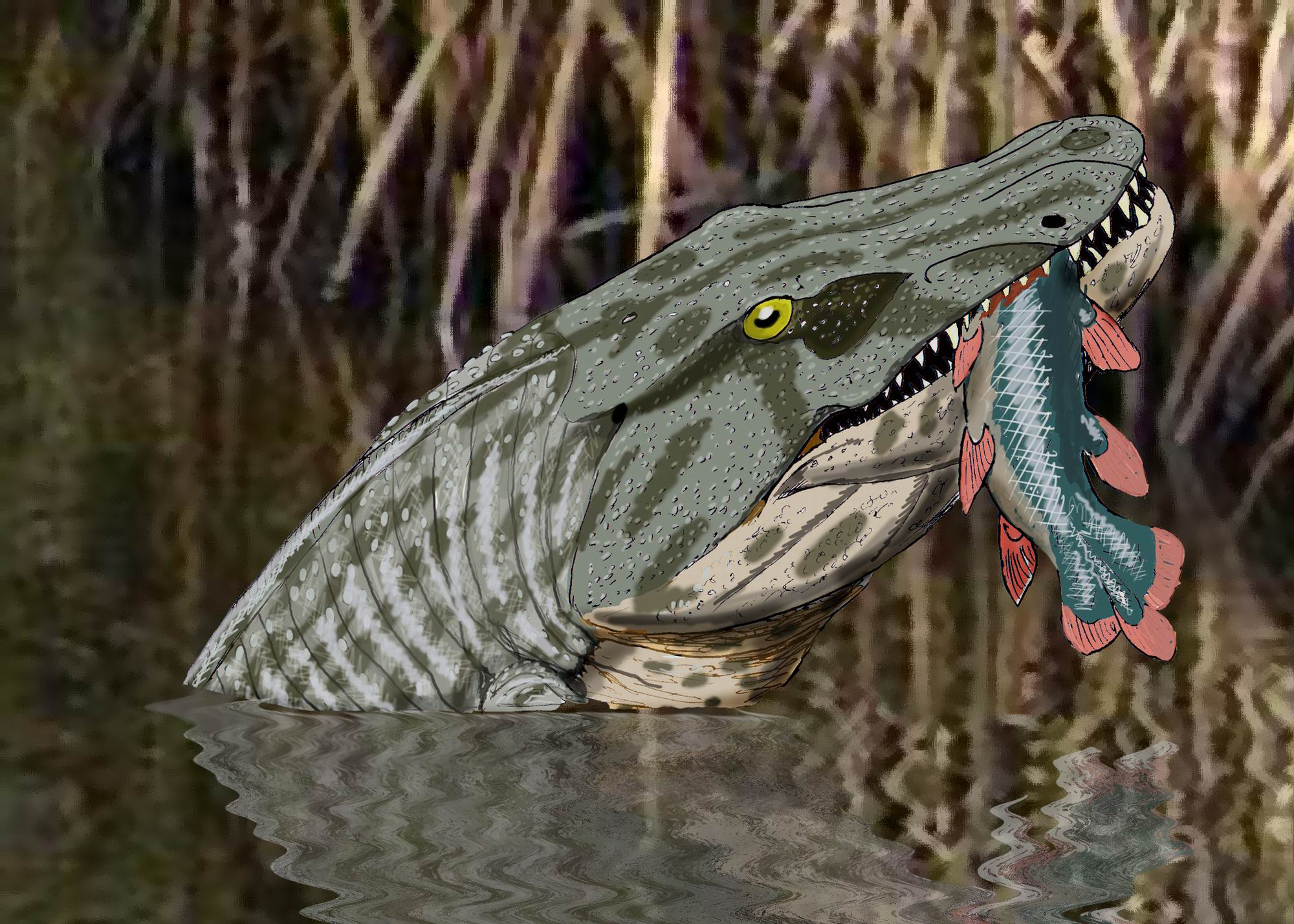
Megalocephalus

It is not clear whether all of the genera assigned to this group are really closely related. The traditional four genera of baphetids (Loxomma, Baphetes, Megalocephalus, and Spathicephalus) have recently been supplemented by Eucritta, a somewhat different form. It has also been suggested that Crassigyrinus may be closely related.

== Taxonomy ==
Baphetids were first described by Edward Drinker Cope when he erected the family Baphetidae in 1865 for Baphetes. Richard Lydekker named Loxomatinae in 1889 for Loxomma, which later became known as Loxommatidae. D. M. S. Watson described the group as Loxommidae in 1917. Later studies have shown Baphetes and Loxomma to be close relatives within the same family, and because Baphetidae was named before Loxommatidae, it has seniority and is the valid name of the group.

=== Phylogeny ===
Baphetids have been previously considered primitive temnospondyls and more recently batrachosaurs (reptile-like amphibia). It is likely, however, that they represent one more of a number of early Carboniferous tetrapodomorph radiations. Computer-assisted phylogenetic analyses of a data matrix using characteristics of most of the major groups of terrestrial vertebrates place the baphetids close to the ancestry of amniotes.

With the reinterpretation of the Ichthyostegalia as aquatic forms, baphetids are good candidates for the spot of first labyrinthodont group to actually spend substantial time on land. If so, baphetids may be a rather important taxon
