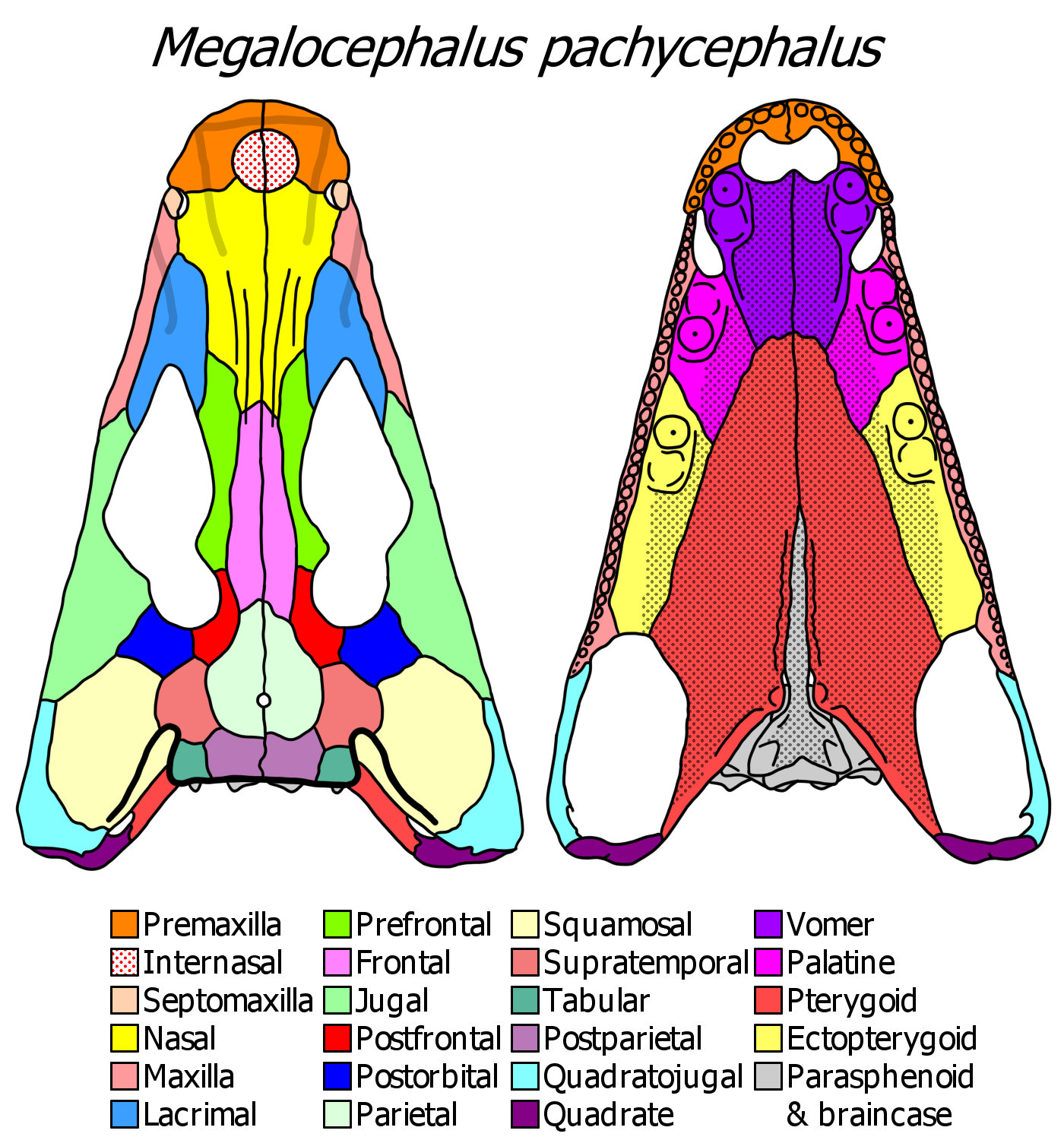
- Skull diagram of Megalocephalus pachycephalus in dorsal view (left) and ventral view (right)

Scientific classification
- Domain: Eukaryota
- Kingdom: Animalia
- Phylum: Chordata
- Clade: Sarcopterygii
- Clade: Tetrapodomorpha
- Family: †Baphetidae
- Subfamily: †Loxommatinae
- Genus: †Megalocephalus; Barkas, 1873

Type species
- †Orthosaurus pachycephalus Barkas, 1873

Species
- †Megalocephalus pachycephalus (Barkas, 1873); †Megalocephalus lineolatus (Cope, 1877)

Synonyms
- Synonyms of M. pachycephalus: Pteroplax brevicornis Thomas & Young, 1870; Orthosaurus pachycephalus Barkas, 1873; Megalocephalus macromma Barkas, 1873; Orthosauriscus pachycephalus (Kuhn, 1933); Megalocephalus brevicornis (Romer, 1947); Synonyms of M. lineolatus: Leptophractus lineolatus Cope, 1877; Anisodexis Cope, 1882

= Megalocephalus =

Megalocephalus Temporal range: Late Carboniferous, Westphalian A-C

Extinct genus of amphibians

Megalocephalus (meaning "big head") is an extinct genus of baphetid tetrapodomorph from the late Carboniferous (Westphalian A-C) of the British Isles and the United States (Ohio). It contains two species, M. pachycephalus and M. lineolatus.

== History ==
=== Megalocephalus pachycephalus ===
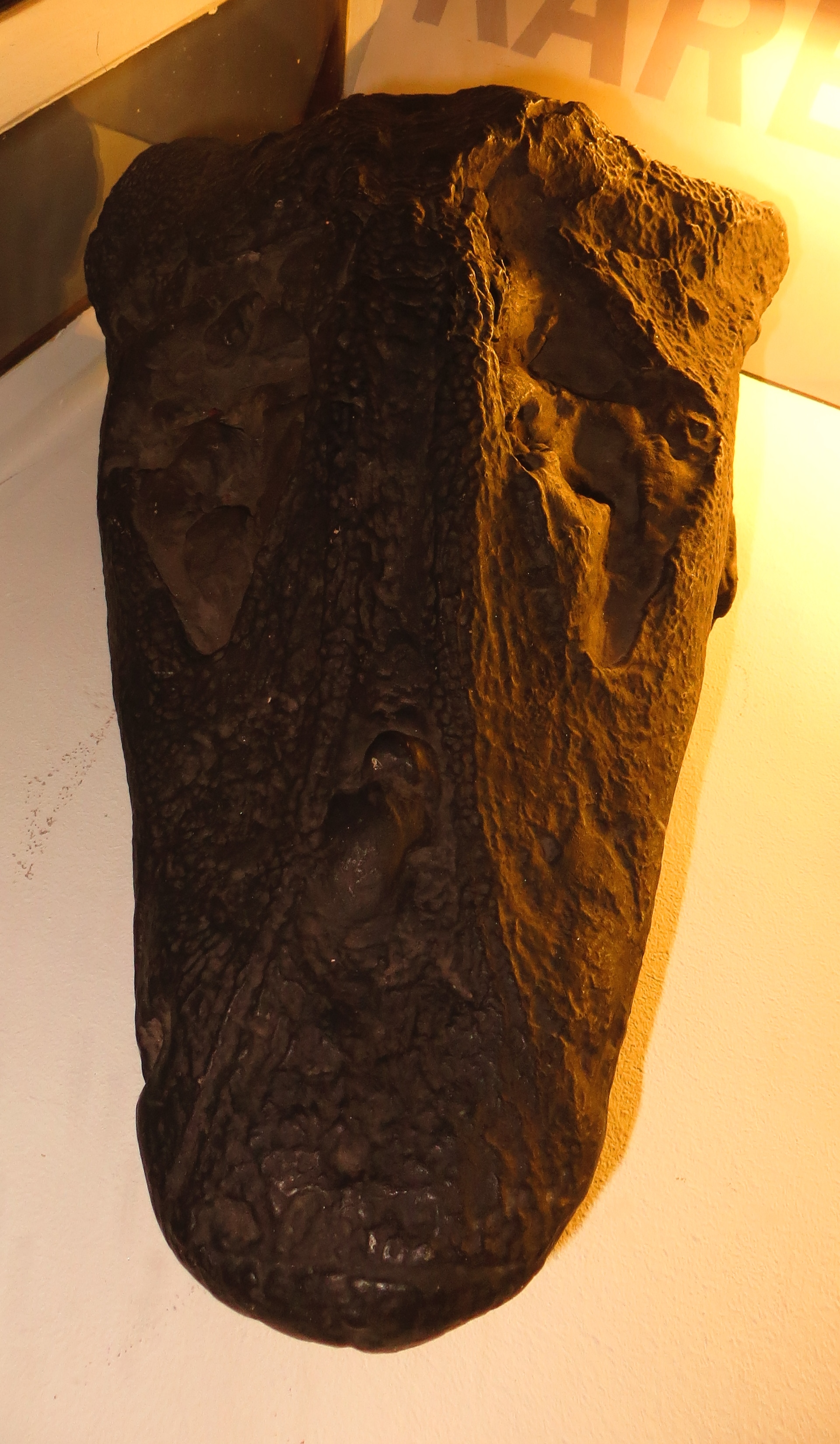
Skull of Megalocephalus pachycephalus

Megalocephalus pachycephalus is one of the most common large tetrapodomorphs from the Carboniferous of Britain, and is known from several sites in England, Scotland, and Ireland. The first known fossils of the genus were cranial fragments which were misattributed to Rhizodus jaw bones upon their discovery in 1864. These fragments, and many subsequent discoveries, were recovered from a quarry near Newsham, Northumberland. Other Megalocephalus fossils found in the 1860s had been referred to other large amphibians, namely Pteroplax and Anthracosaurus. Two well-preserved skulls and associated jaw bones were found in Newsham in 1870 and 1871, though these were also mistakenly referred to a pre-existing genus, Loxomma. In 1873, Thomas P. Barkas named a pair of new genera for two more Newsham skulls. One was described as a supposed new reptile, Orthosaurus pachycephalus, while the other was given the name Megalocephalus macromma.

Megalocephalus fossils continued to be collected in the coming decades, though most were initially referred to Loxomma. "Orthosaurus" was re-established as a distinct genus of loxommatid amphibian by D.M.S. Watson in 1926. However, it was later determined to be a preoccupied name, and the name Orthosauriscus pachycephalus was invented and used for the rest of the early 20th century. In 1947, Alfred Romer decided to rename Orthosauriscus pachycephalus to Megalocephalus brevicornis, combining Barkas' 1873 genus with "Pteroplax" brevicornis, a species named for Megalocephalus fossils in 1870. However, the "Pteroplax" brevicornis fossils were poorly described and probably destroyed by a 1909 fire, so few subsequent paleontologists use Romer's combination. The modern combination Megalocephalus pachycephalus was popularized by Eileen H. Beamont's 1977 redescription of available "loxommatid" fossils.

=== Megalocephalus lineolatus ===
The second apparently valid species in the genus is Megalocephalus lineolatus. This species is from the fossiliferous coal mine of Linton, Ohio, and was originally named as "Leptophractus" lineolatus by E.D. Cope in 1877. In the 1920s, Watson placed the species within "Orthosaurus", based on both Cope's specimens and new loxommatid fossils from Linton. Romer referred all Linton loxommatid material to Macrerpeton huxleyi. However, later investigation revealed that Romer's conception of Macrerpeton was chimeric, including an edopoid temnospondyl (Macrerpeton), a loxommatid (referred to Baphetes), and possibly several more species of loxommatids. Another skull described in 1957 demonstrated that "Leptophractus" lineolatus was a species of Megalocephalus, as it showed several diagnostic traits of the genus. Megalocephalus lineolatus has also been mentioned under the name "Megalocephalus enchodus", based on a belief that the lineolatus species name should instead be assigned to the Baphetes material.

== Description ==
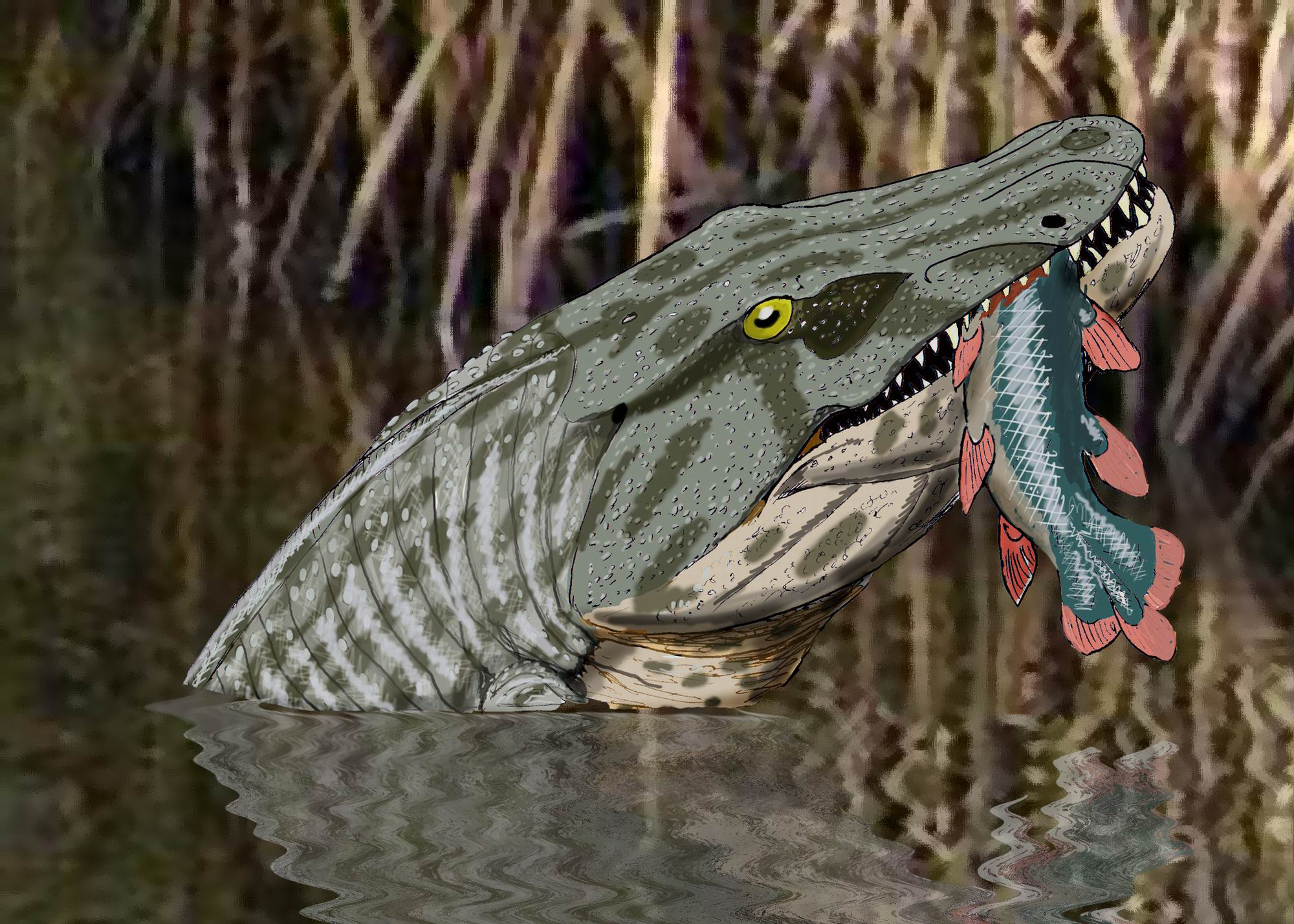
Restoration

Megalocephalus was an amphibian, measuring 1.5 metres (4.9 ft) from head to tail.

=== Skull ===
It is only known from its skull, like most other baphetids. The skull of Megalocephalus was 30 centimetres (12 in) long. The teeth of Megalocephalus were long and pointed. Baphetids had a small elongation of their eye sockets, the current use of which is not certain. It has been suggested that the elongation was housing for a salt gland to get rid of excess salt, or an extra region for jaw muscle attachments, to allow a harder bite force.

Like Kyrinion, the lacrimal is excluded from the nares (nostrils) and the dentary has large fangs. A 2009 phylogenetic analysis suggests that Megalocephalus is paraphyletic relative to Kyrinion, with M. pachycephalus closer to K. martilli than to M. lineolatus. Likewise, Loxomma forms a paraphyletic grade ancestral to Megalocephalus.
