= Tabular bone =

Pair of triangular flat bones along the rear edge of the skull

Skull of the temnospondyl Xenotosuchus, showing the tabulars at the back of the skull in cyan

The tabular bones are a pair of bones along the rear edge of the skull in many primitive tetrapods, often taking the form of a projecting "tabular horn", which formed part of the border of the otic notch. They served as attachment points for the neck muscles. While widely present in early tetrapods, they have been completely lost in all living tetrapod lineages, having been lost in the common ancestor of living reptiles and birds (Sauria), independently lost in caecilians (though present in the most primitive known caecilian Eocaecilia) and the common ancestor of salamanders and frogs (Batrachia), and the mammaliaform ancestors of living mammals.
