= Coronoid bone =

Bone found in non-mammalian vertebrates

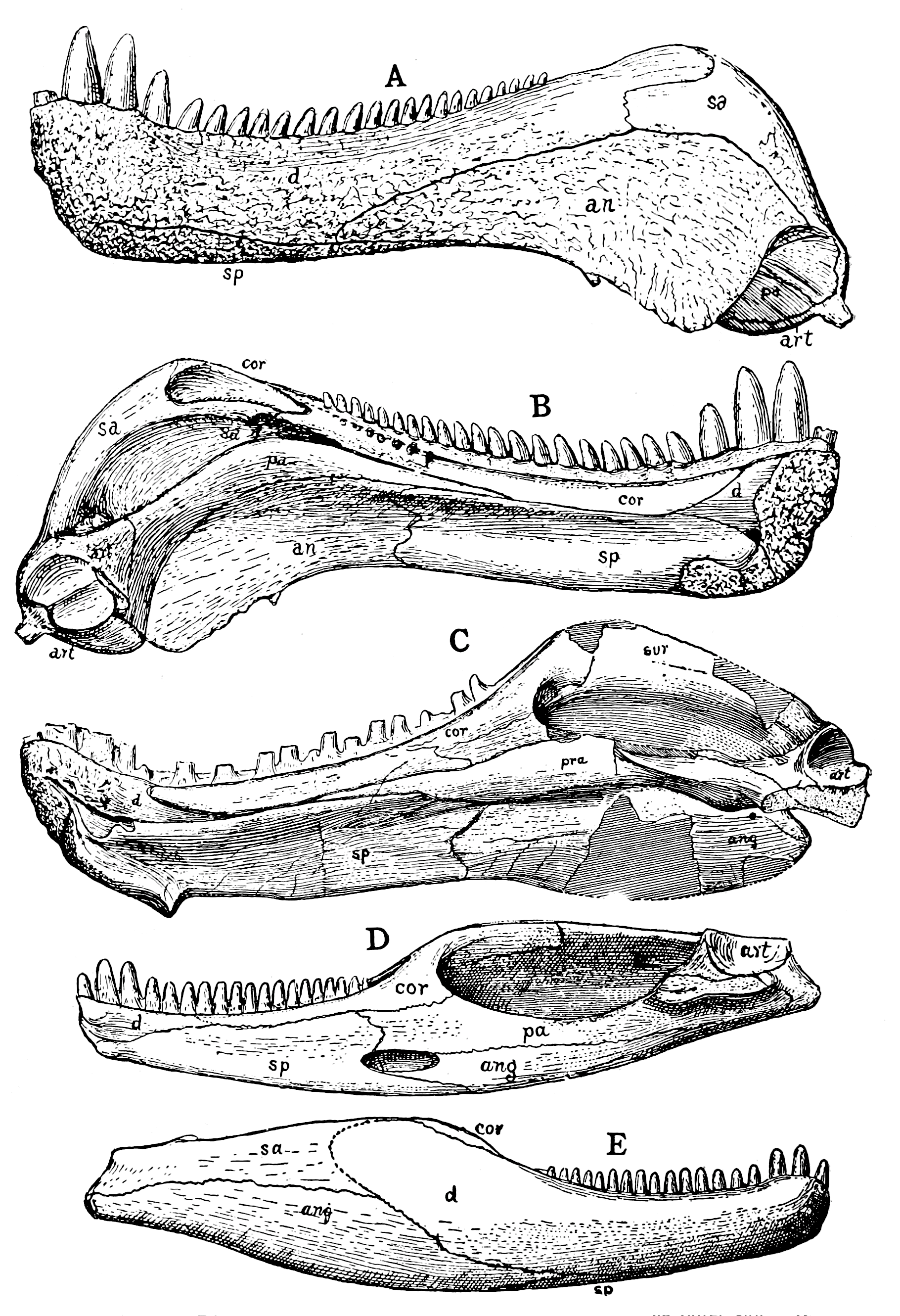
Mandible of Dimetrodon (top) and Labidosaurus (bottom). The coronoid is labeled as cor.

The coronoid is a bone present in the mandible of many non-mammalian vertebrates. It typically lies on the medial wall of each hemimandible. Among its functions, it provides a lever arm for the attachment of jaw muscles.

== Evolution ==
In some actinoperygian fishes, the coronoid occurs near the anterior tip of the mandible and bears teeth.

The coronoid is present in most sauropsids and amphibians.

In early synapsids, the bone was present; it was progressively reduced during the evolution of mammals, and is absent in modern mammals. Its function has been taken over by the coronoid process of the dentary.

In some animals, including some salamanders and parareptiles, the coronoid bears teeth.

In some species, including the parareptile Delorhynchus and the fish Polypterus, multiple coronoid ossifications are present on each side.
