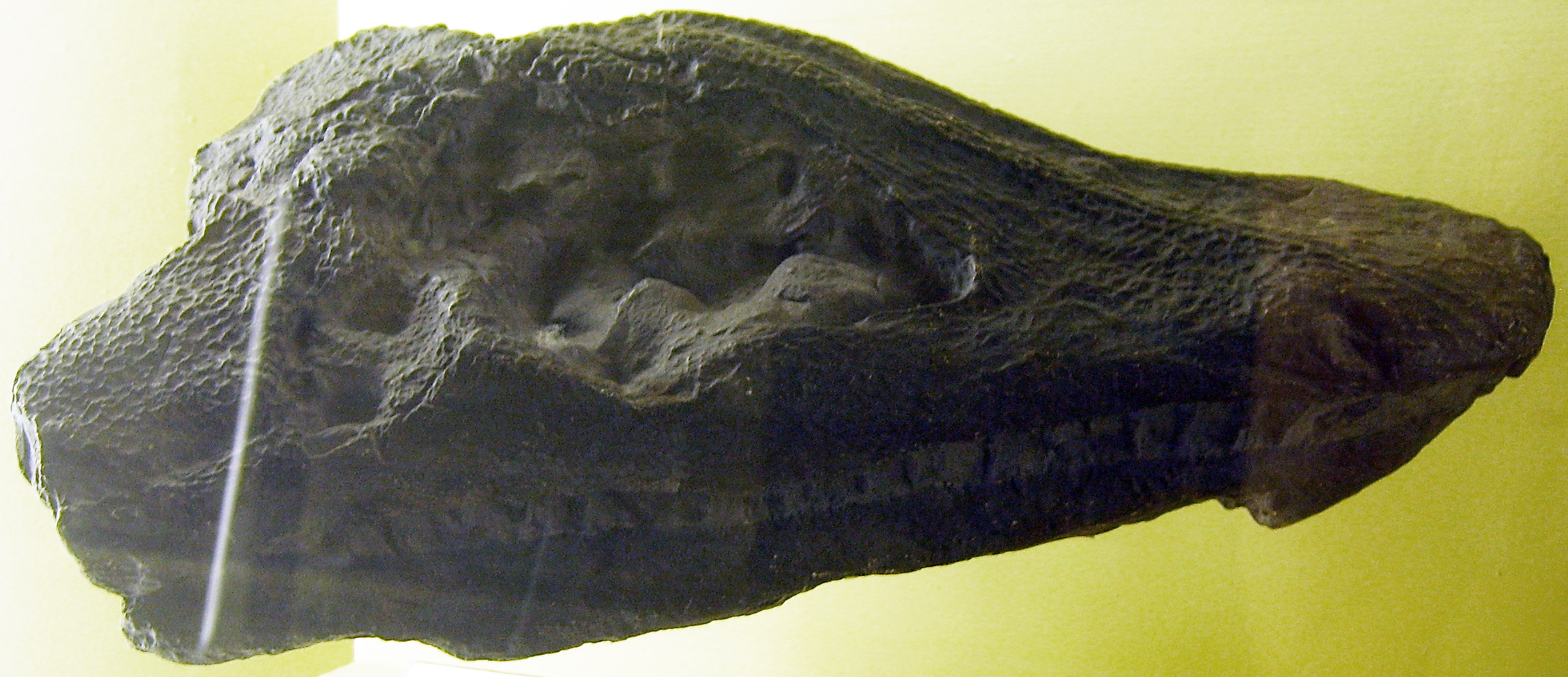
- Loxomma allmanni skull cast at the Museum für Naturkunde, Berlin

Scientific classification
- Kingdom: Animalia
- Phylum: Chordata
- Family: †Baphetidae
- Subfamily: †Loxommatinae
- Genus: †Loxomma; Huxley, 1862

= Loxomma =

Loxomma Temporal range: ~330–306.95 Ma

Extinct genus of amphibians

Loxomma (meaning “slanting eyes”) is an extinct genus of Loxommatinae and one of the first Carboniferous tetrapods. They were first described in 1862 and further described in 1870 when two more craniums were found. It is mostly associated with the area of the United Kingdom. They share features with modern reptiles as well as with fish. They had 4 paddle-like limbs that they used to swim in lakes, but they breathed air. Their diet consisted mostly of live fish. They are of the family Baphetidae which are distinguished by their keyhole shaped orbits, while Loxomma themselves are distinguished by the unique texture on their skulls, said to be honeycomb-like.

== History and discovery ==
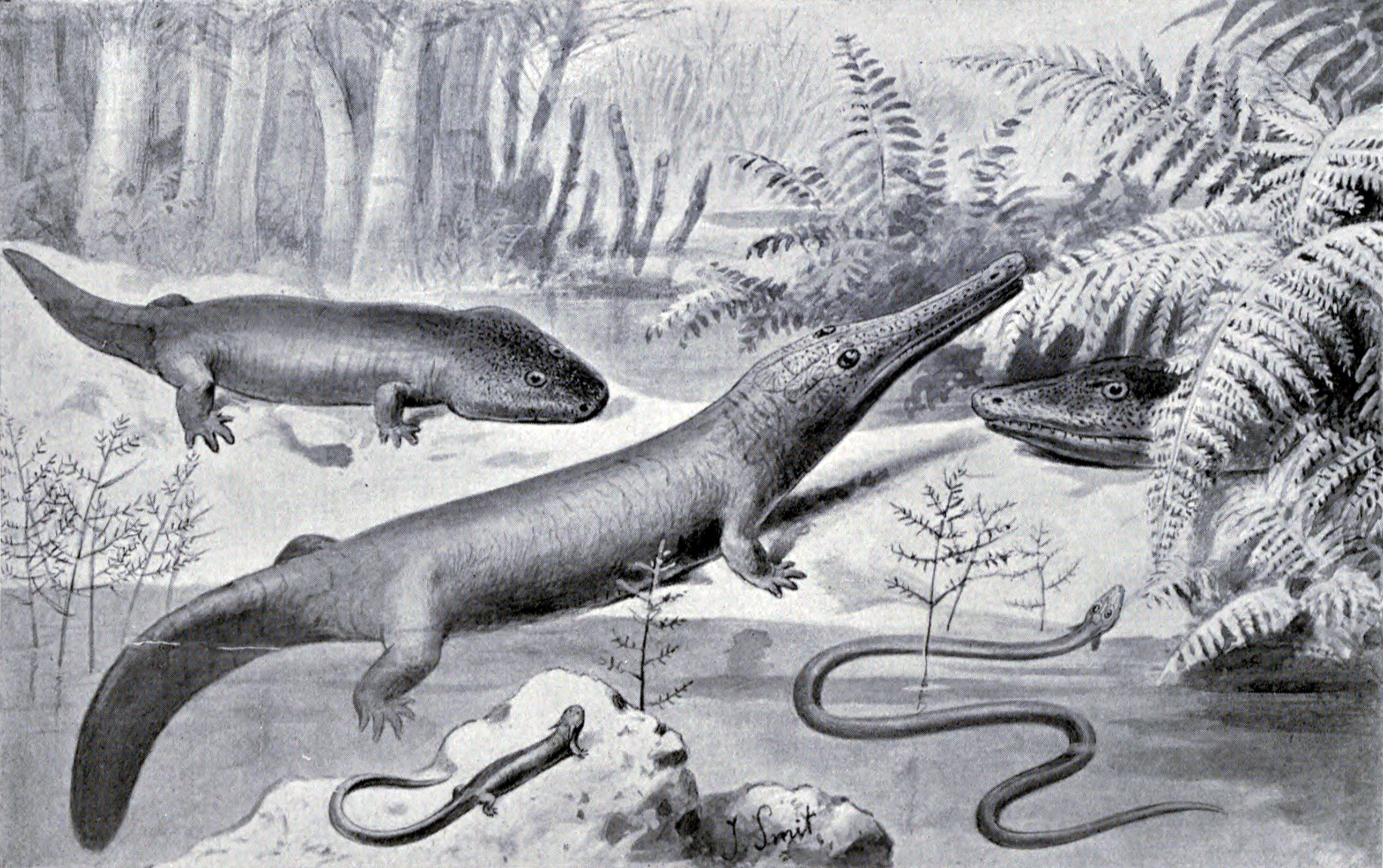
1910 restoration of Loxomma in its ecological environment, hiding under the bush on the right

The genus Loxomma was discovered and named by Thomas Henry Huxley in 1862 via a near perfect cranium, a vertebra and a rib in the Lanarkshire coal-field of Scotland.

The family Baphetidae were among the first Carboniferous tetrapods to be found and were first described by William Dawson in 1863, with Loxomma being the earliest in the family. The subfamily Loxommatinae within Baphetidae includes three genera: Loxomma, Megalocephalus, and Kyrinion. One cranium was found in May 1870 and another was found in June 1870, both by Thomas Atthey.

== Specimen belonging to Loxomma ==
=== B. orientalis ===
Discovered in Nyrany, Czech Republic, the skull of this new specimen was studied in order to determine whether it belonged in the Loxomma group or Baphetes group. The classification was determined by comparing the shape of the skulls from a closely related species.

In order to check for similarities and differences between Loxomma and Baphetes 2 other skulls were used, belonging to L. acutirostris and B. kirkbyi. Loxomma skulls were high and triangular, while the Baphetes had more of a broad flat snout. In Loxomma, the premaxilla showed space for 8 teeth, while Baphetes had space for 10-11 teeth. After checking the specimen, what was thought to be B. orientalis was found to be closer to the Loxomma group. Due to this closer relationship it was proposed to call the specimen L. lintonensis, which is closer to the L. acutirostris in a cladogram.

== Description ==
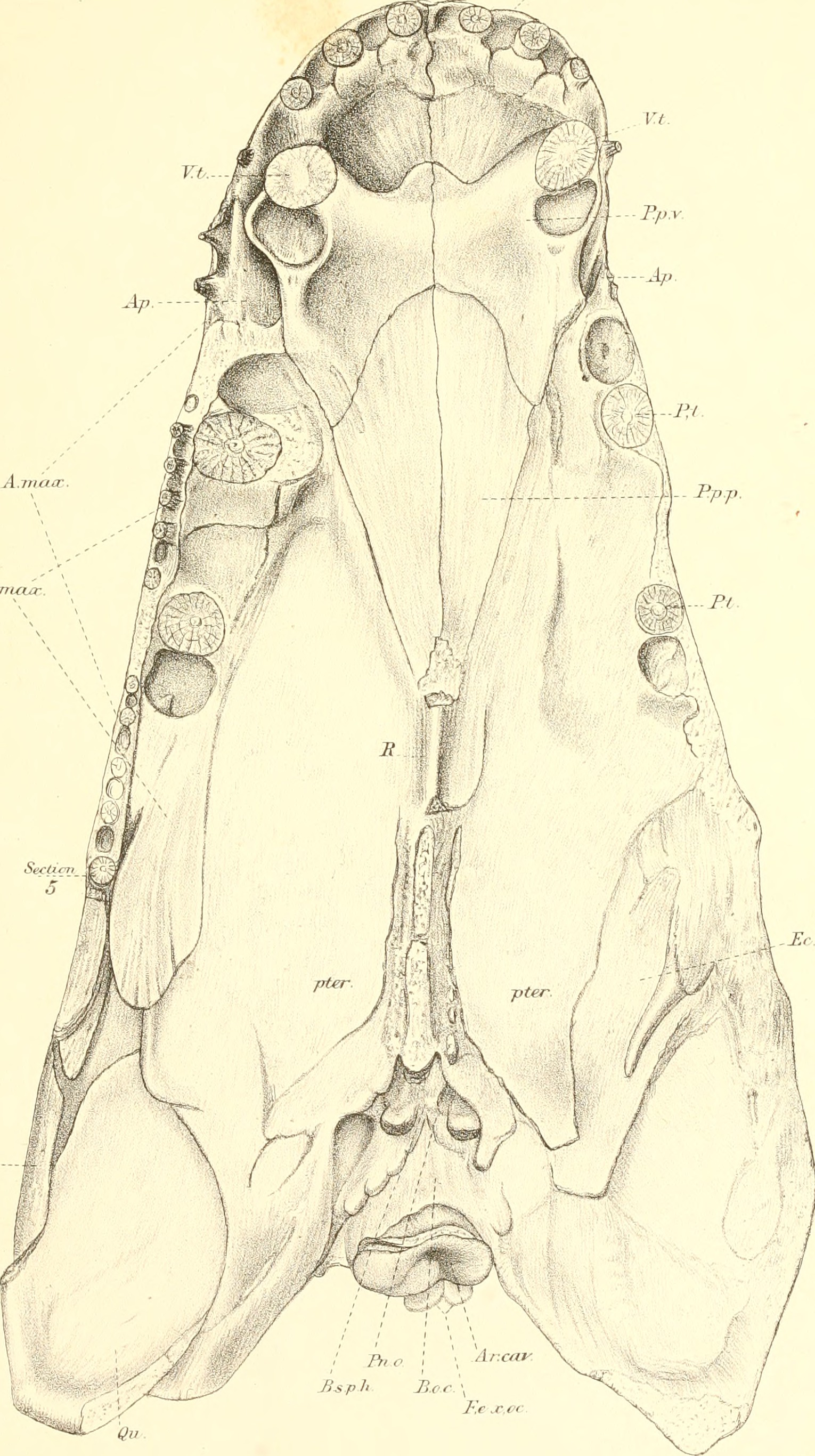
Ventral view of upper jaw

=== Skull and dentition ===
Loxomma and the family Baphetidae are distinct by their large and irregular orbits that have a forwardly directed extension, creating a keyhole shaped orbit. There is a unique pitting on the exposed surfaces of the cranial bones in Loxomma often described as being honeycomb-shaped or net-like that can be used as a distinguishing feature. When looking at the upper surface of the skull it looks like that of Archegosaurus or an alligator of the Crocodilia order, however, the snout and the whole skull is actually broader than that of an alligator.

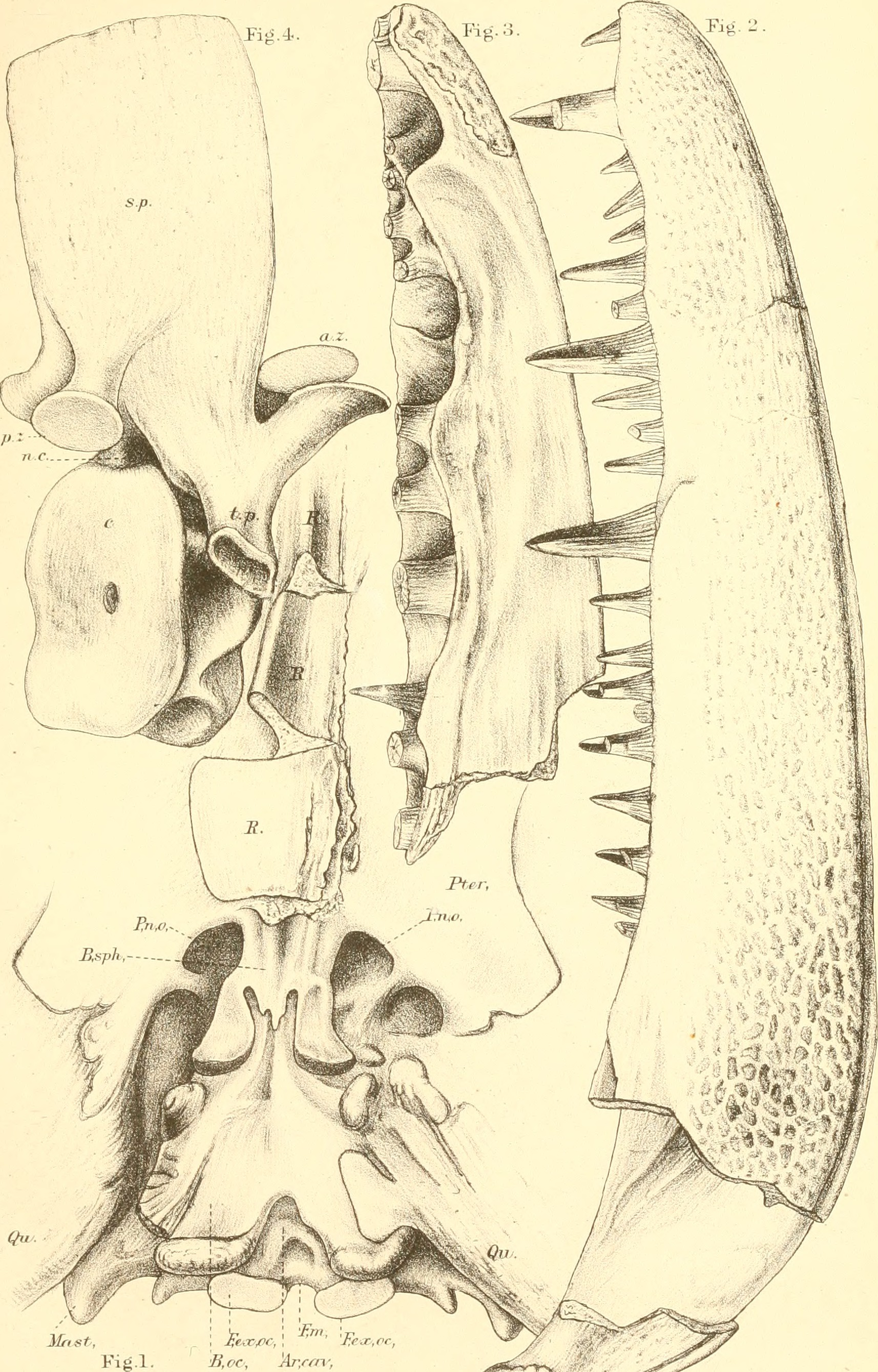
Drawing of parts of the mandible of Loxomma

Large Labyrinthodonts have their lower jaw greatly prolonged behind the hinge to give additional leverage to muscles. Loxomma do not have this feature. Instead they have a hinge at the very end of the lower jaw; in this way they lose some mechanical advantages and power in their bite but gain speed instead.

The jaws and palates have a battery of large, curved, and slightly keeled teeth.

On the upper jaw there is a pair of vomerine tusks, and two pairs of palatal tusks with 5 or 6 smaller teeth between each of the pairs. Each pair of tusks has a depression for two teeth on each side of the jaw with only one tooth present at a time. It was once thought that the empty depression was fit for the teeth of the lower jaw in order to close the mouth, but upon further inspection small bits of tooth could be seen in the empty depressions showing that there was a tooth there once. The size of the teeth varies on the upper and the lower jaw, the larger teeth being more anchored into the mandible than the smaller ones on the lower jaw.

== Paleobiology ==
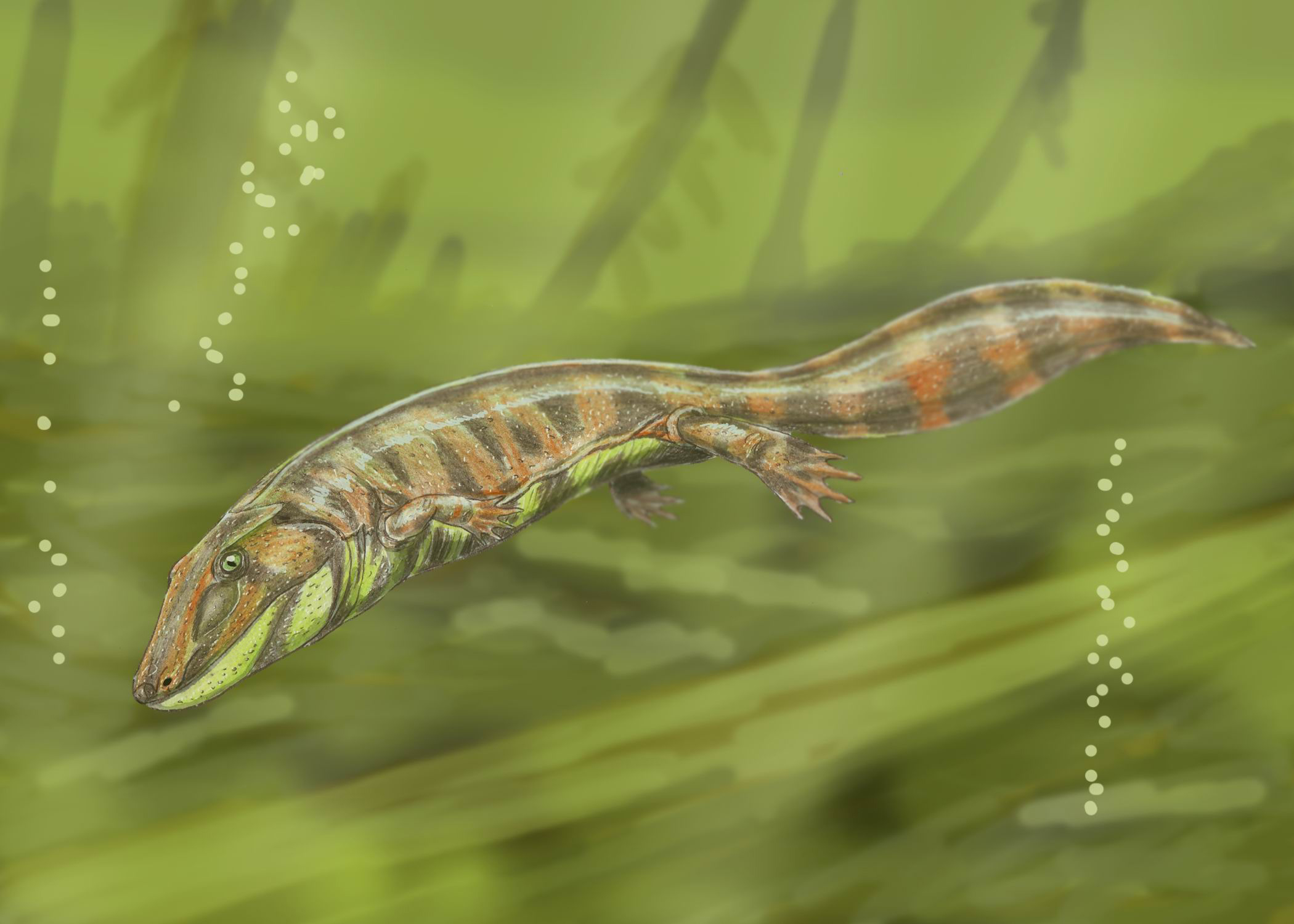
Restoration

Based only on the size of the skull, the full body size of Loxomma is approximated to be 4.3 metres (14 ft) long, although it is hard to tell definitively without the presence of any post-cranial bones. They lived between the water and the land feeding on live fish as is evident in the shape of their jaw hinge and their two-edged teeth. Because the nasal bones are paired and the nasal apertures are both anterior and pharyngeal, it is indicated that they did breathe air. The location of the orbits on the skull are raised up higher than the snout allowing for the animal to stick out its eyes while the rest of the body is underwater. Loxomma had 4 limbs that were paddle-like, based on the presence of one humerus that is elongated and broad below and narrow at its upper end, that they used to swim. It is concluded that they were a rather sluggish stegocephalian that was still capable of rapid movements for predation, swimming like a fish but breathing air like the alligators or crocodiles of today.
